= List of mountains in the Australian Capital Territory =

This is a list of mountains in the Australian Capital Territory. It includes all mountains with a gazetted name as of the publication of the 1996 Gazetteer of Australia.

Mountain/range name	Elevation AHD	Coordinates	Remarks	Notes
Aggie	1,496 m (4,908 ft)	35°28′S 148°46′E	Bimberi Nature Reserve	
Ainslie	843 m (2,766 ft)	35°16′S 149°10′E	Canberra Nature Park	
Arawang	765 m (2,510 ft)	35°22′S 149°3′E	Canberra Nature Park	
Atkinson	765 m (2,510 ft)	35°20′S 149°19′E		
Bimberi Peak	1,912 m (6,273 ft)	35°40′S 148°47′E	Trig, Bimberi Nature Reserve	
Black	812 m (2,664 ft)	35°16′S 149°6′E	Canberra Nature Park	
Black Spring		35°23′S 148°54′E		
Blundell		35°18′S 148°51′E	Namadgi National Park	
Booroomba	1,012 m (3,320 ft)	35°30′S 149°0′E	Namadgi National Park	
Brindabella Range		35°33′S 148°46′E		
Bullen Range		35°22′S 148°58′E	Bullen Range Nature Reserve	
Burbidge	1,720 m (5,640 ft)	35°43′S 148°54′E	Namadgi National Park	
Bushranger Hill		35°24′S 148°47′E		
Clear	1,603 m (5,259 ft)	35°53′S 149°4′E		
Cohen	918 m (3,012 ft)	35°18′S 149°21′E		
Coree	1,421 m (4,662 ft)	35°18′S 148°48′E	Namadgi National Park	
Domain	1,506 m (4,941 ft)	35°29′S 148°52′E		
Franklin	1,646 m (5,400 ft)	35°29′S 148°46′E	Bimberi Nature Reserve	
Gibraltar Peak	1,038 m (3,406 ft)	35°28′S 148°57′E	Tidbinbilla Nature Reserve	
Gingera	1,857 m (6,093 ft)	35°34′S 148°47′E	Bimberi Nature Reserve	
Ginini	1,762 m (5,781 ft)	35°32′S 148°46′E	Bimberi Nature Reserve	
Gudgenby	1,739 m (5,705 ft)	35°46′S 148°55′E		
Kelly	1,829 m (6,001 ft)	35°43′S 148°53′E		
Little Bimberi	1,650 m (5,410 ft)	35°41′S 148°48′E		
Little Ginini	1,735 m (5,692 ft)	35°33′S 148°46′E		
Majura	888 m (2,913 ft)	35°14′S 149°11′E	Canberra Nature Park	
McKeahnie	1,496 m (4,908 ft)	35°33.31′S 148°52.38′E	Trig	
Mount McKeahnie	1,602 m (5,256 ft)	35°35′S 148°52′E		
Mugga Mugga	812 m (2,664 ft)	35°21′S 149°8′E	Canberra Nature Park	
Murray	1,845 m (6,053 ft)	35°41′S 148°47′E		
Namadgi	1,780 m (5,840 ft)	35°42′S 148°53′E	Namadgi National Park	
One Tree Hill	863 m (2,831 ft)	35°08′S 148°05′E	Trig	
Painter	742 m (2,434 ft)	35°16′S 149°4′E	Canberra Nature Park	
Pleasant	663 m (2,175 ft)	35°18′S 149°9′E	Canberra Nature Park	
Reedy		35°19′S 149°16′E		
Rob Roy	1,094 m (3,589 ft)	35°30′S 149°8′E	Rob Roy Range Nature Reserve	
Scabby	1,790 m (5,870 ft)	35°46′S 148°51′E	Namadgi National Park	
Sentry Box	1,718 m (5,636 ft)	35°50′S 148°54′E	Namadgi National Park	
Shanahans	1,411 m (4,629 ft)	35°50′S 149°1′E	Namadgi National Park	
Stromlo	770 m (2,530 ft)	35°19′S 149°0′E		
Taylor	856 m (2,808 ft)	35°22′S 149°5′E	Canberra Nature Park	
Tennent	1,375 m (4,511 ft)	35°33′S 149°3′E	Namadgi National Park	
The Pimple	1,460 m (4,790 ft)	35°26′S 148°51′E	Namadgi National Park	
Tidbinbilla	1,583 m (5,194 ft)	35°27′S 148°52′E	Tidbinbilla Nature Reserve	
Tuggeranong Hill	855 m (2,805 ft)	35°27′S 149°6′E		
Wanniassa	809 m (2,654 ft)	35°24′S 149°7′E	Canberra Nature Park	
Yankee Hat	1,554 m (5,098 ft)	35°45′S 148°56′E	Namadgi National Park	
Yarara	1,241 m (4,072 ft)	35°42′S 149°6′E		

== See also ==
- List of mountains in Australia
