= Skiing in the Australian Capital Territory =

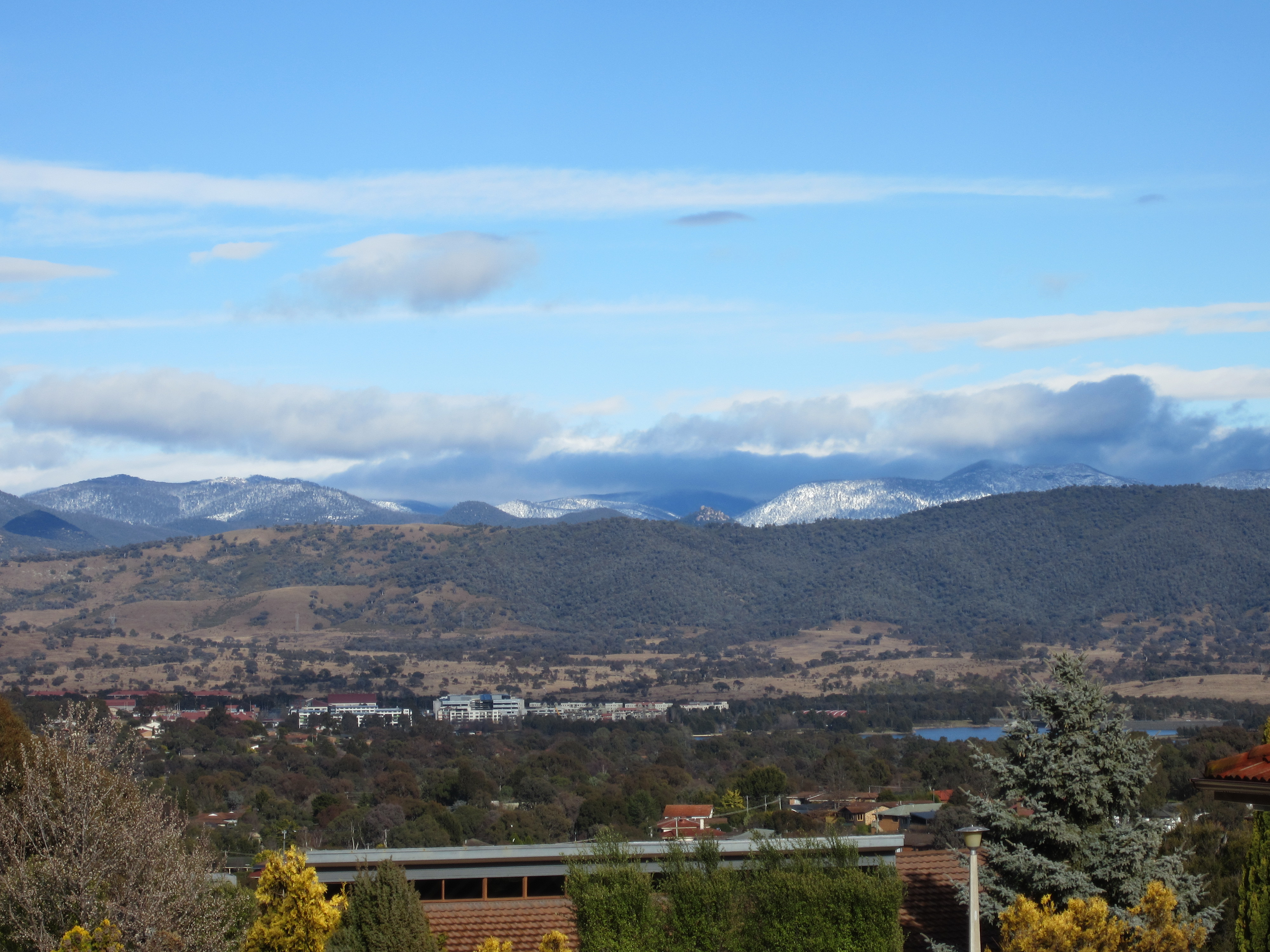
Snow on the Brindabella Ranges, August 2012.

The Australian Capital Territory (ACT) has a relatively large alpine environment proportional to its overall size, mainly through the Brindabella Ranges along its southern border, forming part of the Australian Alps, with Bimberi Peak standing at 1912m being the highest point in the ACT. Recreational snow skiing commenced with the formation of the Canberra Alpine Club in 1934. Since the 1930s, the ACT has had intermittent and limited alpine skiing facilities. Downhill ski facilities returned to the ACT at Corin Forest in 2016, after a two decade hiatus.

The only commercial ski field in the ACT is located at Corin Forest; however, cross country skiing takes place in areas such as the Namadgi National Park, Bimberi Nature Reserve, Mount Franklin, Mount Ginini and Mount Gingera when conditions allow. The more extensive and developed New South Wales skifields are located south-west of the Territory.

== History and major locations ==
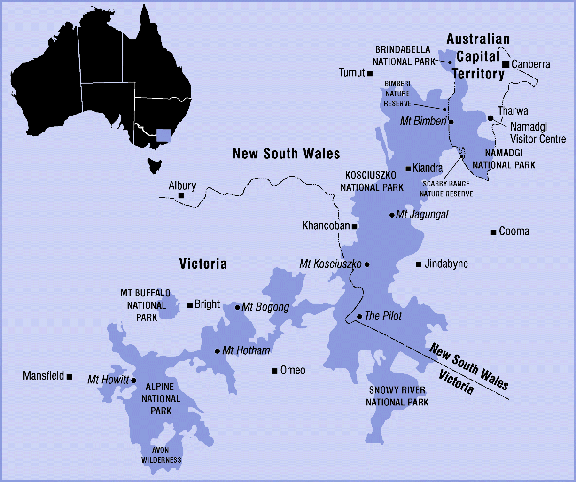
Alpine National Parks of the Australian mainland

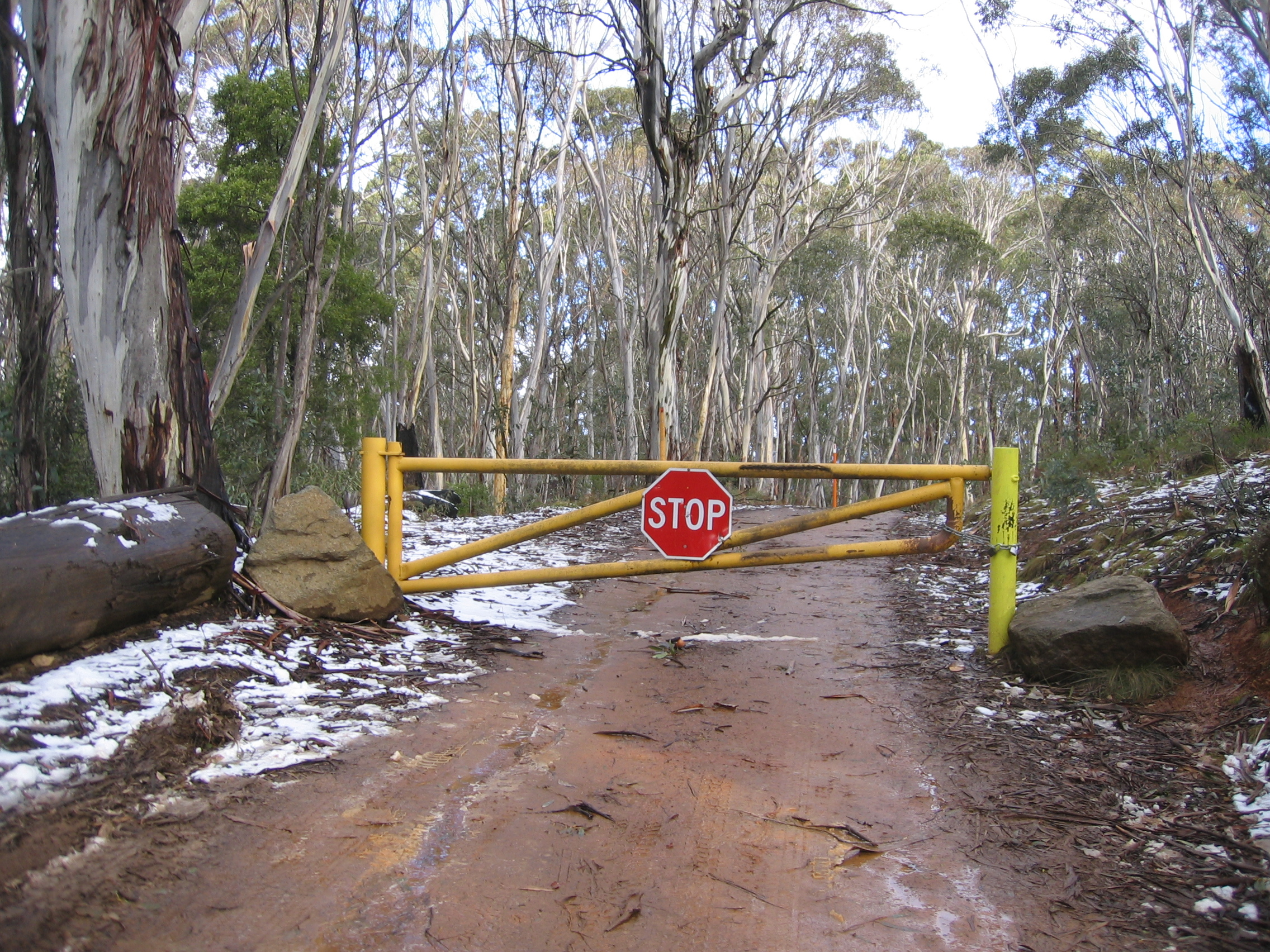
The road to Mount Franklin, ACT, was built by the Canberra Alpine Club in the 1930s.

The most northerly ski fields in Australia are located in the Australian Capital Territory – in the ranges west of Australia's capital city, Canberra. During the Southern Hemisphere winter, skiing in Australia takes place in the ACT and in three States: New South Wales, Victoria and Tasmania. Skiable terrain stretches through large areas of territory from June to October and a number of well serviced resorts have been developed in the States.

Namadgi National Park in the ACT and Bimberi Nature Reserve and Brindabella National Park in New South Wales are located in the Brindabella Ranges. The highest mountain in the ACT is Bimberi Peak, which lies above the treeline at 1912 metres, at the northern edge of the Snowy Mountains. The alpine regions are subject to environmental protection, which has limited the scope of commercial development of skiiable terrain, Organised downhill skiing in the ACT was started by the Canberra Alpine Club in 1934, and was for decades centred around Mt Franklin. Since the 1980s, some downhill facilities have existed intermittently at Corin Forest.

=== Downhill skiing ===
The Namadgi National Park Draft Management Plan (September 2005) downplayed the future development of skiing as a sport in the Park, noting that no facilities existed for alpine or downhill skiing within Namadgi, despite a history of downhill skiing associated with the Canberra Alpine Ski Club and the Mt Franklin Chalet (destroyed in the 2003 bushfires). The report predicted that it would be "unlikely that Namadgi will be suitable for this activity in the future as climate change is causing conditions to become less favourable". However, since the report was written, limited downhill ski facilities have returned at Corin Forest.

Mt Franklin

In the 1930s, with construction of the new capital city of Canberra underway, Canberrans explored the possibilities for developing skiing and snow sports in the Brindabellas. On 30 June 1936, the Canberra Times newspaper reported:

Regularly-conducted Alpine Sports on the mountain range which forms the western boundary between the Federal Capital Territory and New South Wales are to be added to the attractions of Canberra. The Canberra Alpine Club, an enthusiastic body, which has a membership of about 80, has plans in hand which, its members consider, will in the future make Canberra's ranges rival Mount Kosciuszko in popularity.

The Mount Franklin chalet was constructed at Mount Franklin in 1938 to service the Canberra Alpine Club. Ski runs were cleared and ski tows were improvised. The Club also cleared runs elsewhere, completing a new ski run and jump on nearby Mount Ginini in 1951 - then judged to be the superior slope.

Built on leased land, the Mount Franklin Chalet reverted to the Government when Namadgi National Park was created in 1984 and later operated as a museum before being destroyed in the 2003 bushfires. A new shelter designed and built by University of Adelaide students opened in 2008. Today, cross country skiing is possible in the area, when conditions allow.

Corin Forest

In the 1980s and 1990s, limited downhill skiing took place at Corin Forest near Canberra (elevation 1200m). The Namadgi National Park Draft Management Plan (September 2005) for the Namadgi National Park downplayed the future development of skiing as a sport in the Park: However, in the 2010s, a ski lift was installed at Corin Forest offering a beginners' ski run and snow play area. A development plan for Corin had been drafted following the 2003 Canberra bushfires which would see three 600m chairlifts installed together with snowmaking facilities and accommodation at this site. New owners took over in 2013 and installed a beginners' magic carpet ski lift for the 2016 season, expanded snow making facilities, and invested in ski hire equipment, a ski school and ski first aid to service an 80-metre-long and 60-metre-wide slope, with capacity for a maximum of 150 people.

=== Cross country skiing ===
Snow falls widely over the high country of the Namadgi National Park, being most common on the Bimberi and Brindabella Ranges. Brindabella Road, Mt Franklin Road and Boboyan Road access this snow country and can be hazardous in winter.

According to the Namadgi National Park Draft Management Plan of September 2005, ski touring is a minor activity in Namadgi "as snowfall is only adequate for skiing for short periods in winter and spring. In most years, snow play can occur over several weeks, even if snow is present in small patches on the higher peaks..."

Today, cross country skiing is possible in the Mt Franklin area, when conditions allow. Cross Country skiing is also practised at Mount Gingera, which rises above the city of Canberra to an elevation of 1855m, and is the most prominent snow-covered peak above the city. The Australian High Country is populated by unique flora and fauna including wombats, wallabies, echidnas, and the snow gum.

== List of downhill ski areas ==
Current locations

- Corin Forest Mountain Resort

Former locations

- Mount Franklin

== List of cross country ski locations ==
- Australian Capital Territory
  - Namadgi National Park
    - Mount Ginini
    - Mount Franklin
    - Mount Gingera
  - Bimberi Nature Reserve

== Gallery ==
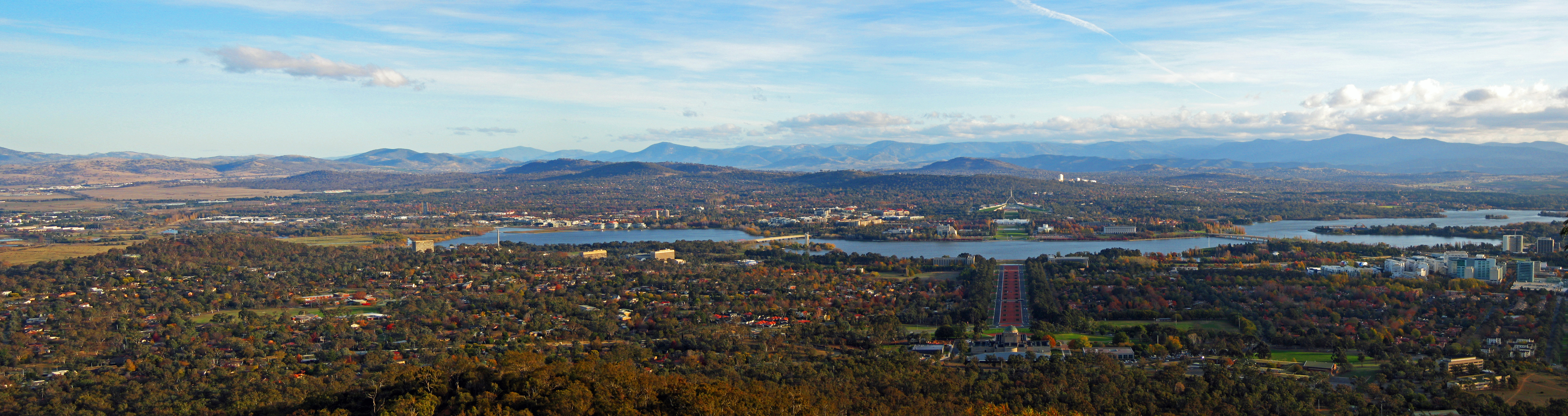
The city of Canberra, looking towards the Brindabella Ranges

== See also ==
- Skiing in Australia
- Skiing in Victoria, Australia
- Skiing in New South Wales
- Skiing in Tasmania
- List of ski areas and resorts in Australia
- Winter sport in Australia
