= Ginini Flats Wetlands Ramsar Site =

Australian protected natural area

Coordinates: 35°31′S 148°46′E

Designations

Ramsar Wetland
- Official name: Ginini Flats Subalpine Bog Complex
- Designated: 1 March 1996
- Reference no.: 793

The Ginini Flats Wetlands Ramsar Site, also known as the Ginini Flats Subalpine Bog Complex, is a wetland in the Australian Capital Territory (ACT) that has been recognised as being of international importance by designation under the Ramsar Convention. It was listed on 11 March 1996 as Ramsar Site 793, and is the only such site in the ACT. It lies in the Australian Alps, close to the boundary of the ACT with New South Wales.

== History ==
Before the disruption of traditional Aboriginal society by white settlers from 1825, many Aboriginal groups throughout the southern tablelands and slopes moved to the high country above 1,300 m in early summer to harvest bogong moths, hold ceremonies and conduct trade. The region, including the area around the site, was subsequently used for livestock grazing and peat extraction. It is now protected within Namadgi National Park. Current human use of the area is largely limited to bushwalking and ski touring.

== Description ==
The site comprises a group of subalpine, spring-fed Sphagnum bogs, wet grassland and heath, with ephemeral pools and permanent streams, within a complex of interconnected flats known as the Ginini Flats and Cheyenne Flats. Its bogs include some of the largest, deepest and best preserved in mainland south-eastern Australia. The site lies at an altitude of between 1,500 and 1,600 m asl in the Brindabella Ranges, close to Mount Ginini and within the catchment of the Cotter River. The total area of wetland is about 50 ha, with the local catchment covering about 410 ha.

The area has an annual average rainfall of about 1,250 mm, with a mean minimum temperature of 4.2 °C and mean maximum at 13.4 °C. Snow falls from June to September, and freezing conditions, with temperatures falling to -20 °C, occur from about 1,450 m asl upwards. Most summer days are mild to warm, though series of hot days with temperatures of 35 °C and over can occur. Periods of drought sometimes dry out the Flats, and fires may be caused by lightning strikes.

== Flora and fauna ==
The bogs lie at the northern limit of Sphagnum in the Australian Alps. The wetlands are surrounded by low open snowgum woodland with a mixed grass, herb and shrub understorey. Permanently wet areas are colonised by Sphagnum bog, mixed with wet herbfield, and wet heath dominated by swamp heath. Carex sedgelands develop on the edges of open water. Dry heath of leafy bossiaea and alpine shaggy-pea adjoins the woodlands in drier areas. On more permanently moist sites it is replaced by tall wet heath, dominated by woolly tea-tree.

The Ginini Flats support rare or endemic vertebrates and invertebrates, with many species at the northern limit of their range. The site is particularly important for the conservation of the northern corroboree frog (Pseudophryne pengilleyi), an endangered endemic frog, with a limited distribution, found only at altitudes over 1000 m asl. It also provides feeding and refuge habitat for transient Latham’s snipe during drought conditions. Broad-toothed rats inhabit the hummock grasslands, wet heath and bog complex. Large mammals include the eastern grey kangaroo, swamp wallaby, red-necked wallaby, short-beaked echidna, mountain brushtail possum, common ringtail possum and common wombat.
