= List of ski areas and resorts in Australia =

== Australian Capital Territory ==
Resorts:

- Corin Forest

Snow country:

- Bimberi Nature Reserve
  - Mount Franklin
- Namadgi National Park

== New South Wales ==
Resorts:

- Charlotte Pass
- Perisher
  - Blue Cow
  - Guthega
  - Perisher Valley
  - Smiggin Holes
- Selwyn snowfields
  - Cabramurra (private ski tows)
  - Kiandra (abandoned mining town, birthplace of Australian skiing)
- Thredbo

Snow country:

- Kosciuszko National Park
  - The Main Range
  - Mount Jagungal

== Tasmania ==
Resorts:

- Ben Lomond
- Mount Mawson

Snow country:

- Ben Lomond National Park
- Cradle Mountain-Lake St Clair National Park
- Mount Field National Park

== Victoria ==
Resorts:

- Falls Creek
- Lake Mountain
- Mount Baw Baw
- Mount Buffalo
- Mount Buller
- Mount Hotham
  - Dinner Plain
- Mount St Gwinear
- Mount Stirling
- Tanjil Bren Accommodation

Snow country:

- Alpine National Park
  - Bogong High Plains
  - Mount Bogong
  - Mount Feathertop
- Baw Baw National Park
- Mount Buffalo National Park
- Mount Donna Buang
- Mount Torbreck

== See also ==
List of ski areas and resorts in Oceania
