= Corin Forest =

Australian ski field and tourist destination

- Interactive map of Corin Forest
- Location: Australian Capital Territory, Australia
- Nearest city: Canberra
- Coordinates: 35.515569°S 148.921632°E
- Base elevation: 1,200 metres (3,900 ft)
- Longest run: Magic Carpet ride 80 metres (260 ft)
- Lift system: 1
- Snowmaking: Yes
- Night skiing: Yes
- Website: http://www.corin.com.au

Corin Forest Mountain Resort (elevation 1200m) is a commercial ski field and tourist destination located in the Tidbinbilla Range, south-west of Canberra, Australia. It is situated in a mountain ash forest near the Namadgi National Park. In winter, it offers Australia's most northerly lifted ski area and the closest snowfield to the national capital of Canberra. A 1.2 km (0.75 mi) alpine slide operates in the warmer months, the longest in the Southern Hemisphere.

== History and mountain statistics ==
Corin Forest is located on the road to Corin Dam, close to Namadgi National Park and Tidbinbilla Nature Reserve, around 45 minutes from Canberra. It is the only commercial skifield in the Australian Capital Territory.

In the 1980s and 1990s, limited downhill skiing took place at Corin Forest. A development plan for Corin had been drafted following the 2003 Canberra bushfires which would see three 600m chairlifts installed together with snowmaking facilities and accommodation at this site.

New owners took over in 2013 and installed a beginners' magic carpet ski lift for the 2016 season, expanded snow making facilities, and invested in ski hire equipment, a ski school and ski first aid to service an 80-metre-long and 60-metre-wide slope, with capacity for a maximum of 150 people.

== See also ==
- Tidbinbilla Nature Reserve
- Corin Dam
- Namadgi National Park
- Skiing in Australia
- Skiing in New South Wales
- Skiing in Tasmania
- Skiing in Victoria
