= Mount Ginini =

Mountain in the Brindabella Range, Australia

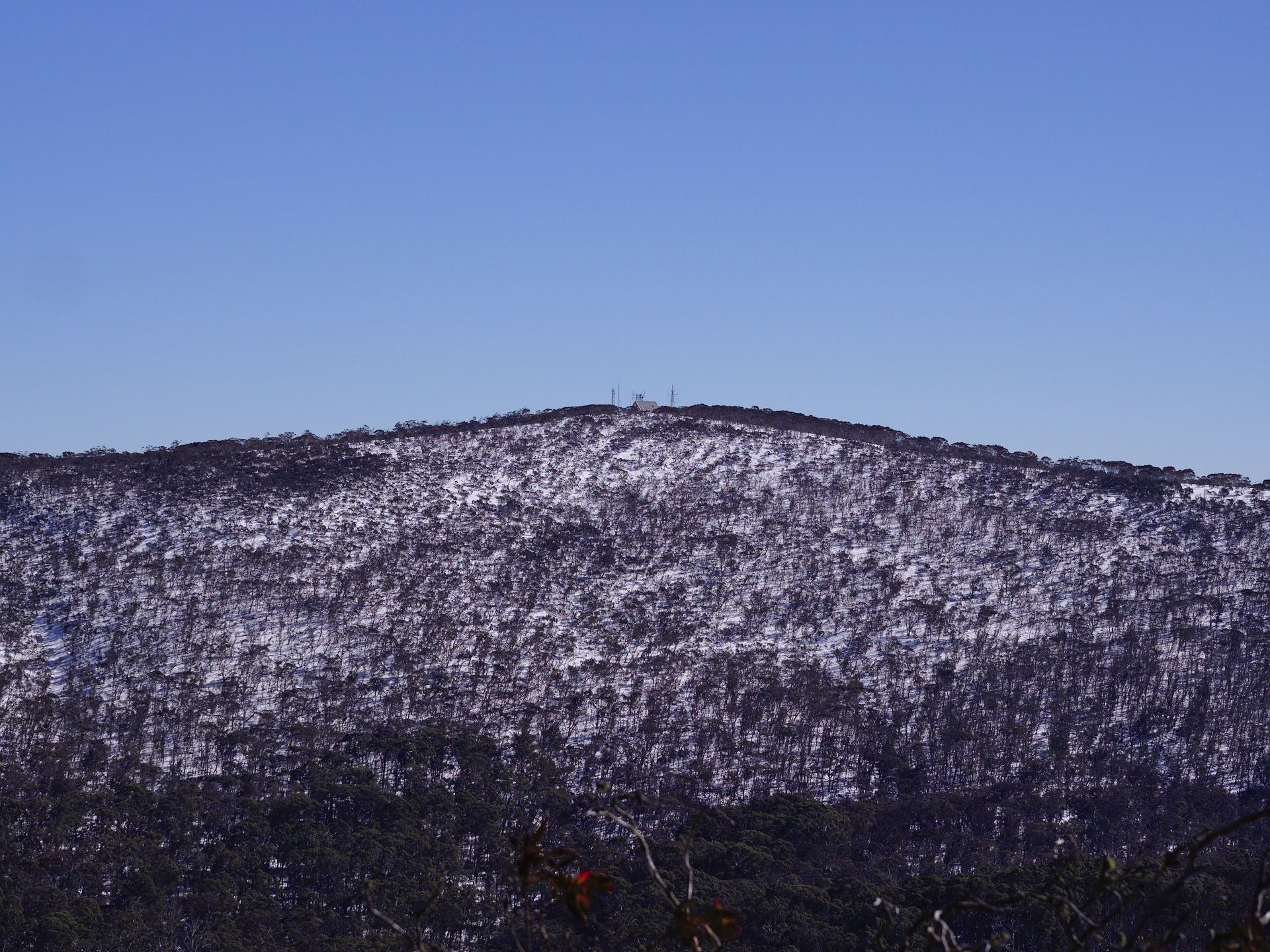
- Mount Ginini viewed from Stockyard Spur

Highest point
- Elevation: 1,762 m (5,781 ft)
- Prominence: 202 m (663 ft)
- Coordinates: 35°32′S 148°47′E

Geography
- Location within Australian Capital Territory
- Location: Australian Capital Territory / New South Wales, Australia
- Parent range: Brindabella Range

Mount Ginini is a mountain with an elevation of 1,762 metres (5,781 ft) AHDin the Brindabella Range, located on the border between the Australian Capital Territory and New South Wales, Australia.

== Geography ==
The summit of the mountain is located within the ACT, and is the seventh highest mountain in the Territory. The ACT portion of the mountain is located in Bimberi Nature Reserve and Namadgi National Park and the NSW portion in Kosciuszko National Park. It is often climbed by bushwalkers from Corin Dam, as it is a few hours' hike. The mountain is close to the Ginini Flats Wetlands Ramsar Site.

== Facilities ==
The mountain is home to an Airservices Australia installation serving as part of the AERIES network and as a transceiver for communications between ATCs and aircraft. It also hosts a repeater station (VK1RGI) for the local amateur radio club. The transmitter tower is located at 35°31′46.61″S 148°46′21.06″E.

== Climate ==
Mount Ginini has a subpolar oceanic climate (Cfc) with cool to mild summers and cold, very snowy winters.

Climate data for Mount Ginini AWS (2004–)
Month	Jan	Feb	Mar	Apr	May	Jun	Jul	Aug	Sep	Oct	Nov	Dec	Year
Record high °C (°F)	33.2 (91.8)	30.2 (86.4)	25.8 (78.4)	22.4 (72.3)	16.0 (60.8)	12.6 (54.7)	10.2 (50.4)	16.0 (60.8)	19.9 (67.8)	23.3 (73.9)	27.8 (82.0)	29.0 (84.2)	33.2 (91.8)
Mean daily maximum °C (°F)	20.8 (69.4)	18.9 (66.0)	16.4 (61.5)	11.9 (53.4)	7.7 (45.9)	3.9 (39.0)	2.4 (36.3)	4.1 (39.4)	8.5 (47.3)	12.8 (55.0)	15.7 (60.3)	17.8 (64.0)	11.7 (53.1)
Mean daily minimum °C (°F)	10.0 (50.0)	9.0 (48.2)	7.3 (45.1)	4.0 (39.2)	1.1 (34.0)	−1.0 (30.2)	−2.5 (27.5)	−2.0 (28.4)	0.3 (32.5)	2.9 (37.2)	5.9 (42.6)	7.3 (45.1)	3.5 (38.3)
Record low °C (°F)	−1.3 (29.7)	−2.0 (28.4)	−2.0 (28.4)	−5.0 (23.0)	−6.4 (20.5)	−8.5 (16.7)	−8.0 (17.6)	−8.2 (17.2)	−6.6 (20.1)	−5.5 (22.1)	−6.0 (21.2)	−4.0 (24.8)	−8.5 (16.7)
Average precipitation mm (inches)	74.5 (2.93)	94.4 (3.72)	78.8 (3.10)	59.9 (2.36)	57.1 (2.25)	86.8 (3.42)	101.9 (4.01)	88.5 (3.48)	90.5 (3.56)	72.8 (2.87)	108.9 (4.29)	107.9 (4.25)	1,051.2 (41.39)
Average precipitation days	10.9	12.7	12.0	9.9	10.0	12.1	16.4	13.6	11.8	10.2	12.2	12.4	144.2

== See also ==
- Mount Franklin
- Mount Gingera
- List of mountains of Australia
- Skiing in the Australian Capital Territory
- Skiing in Australia
