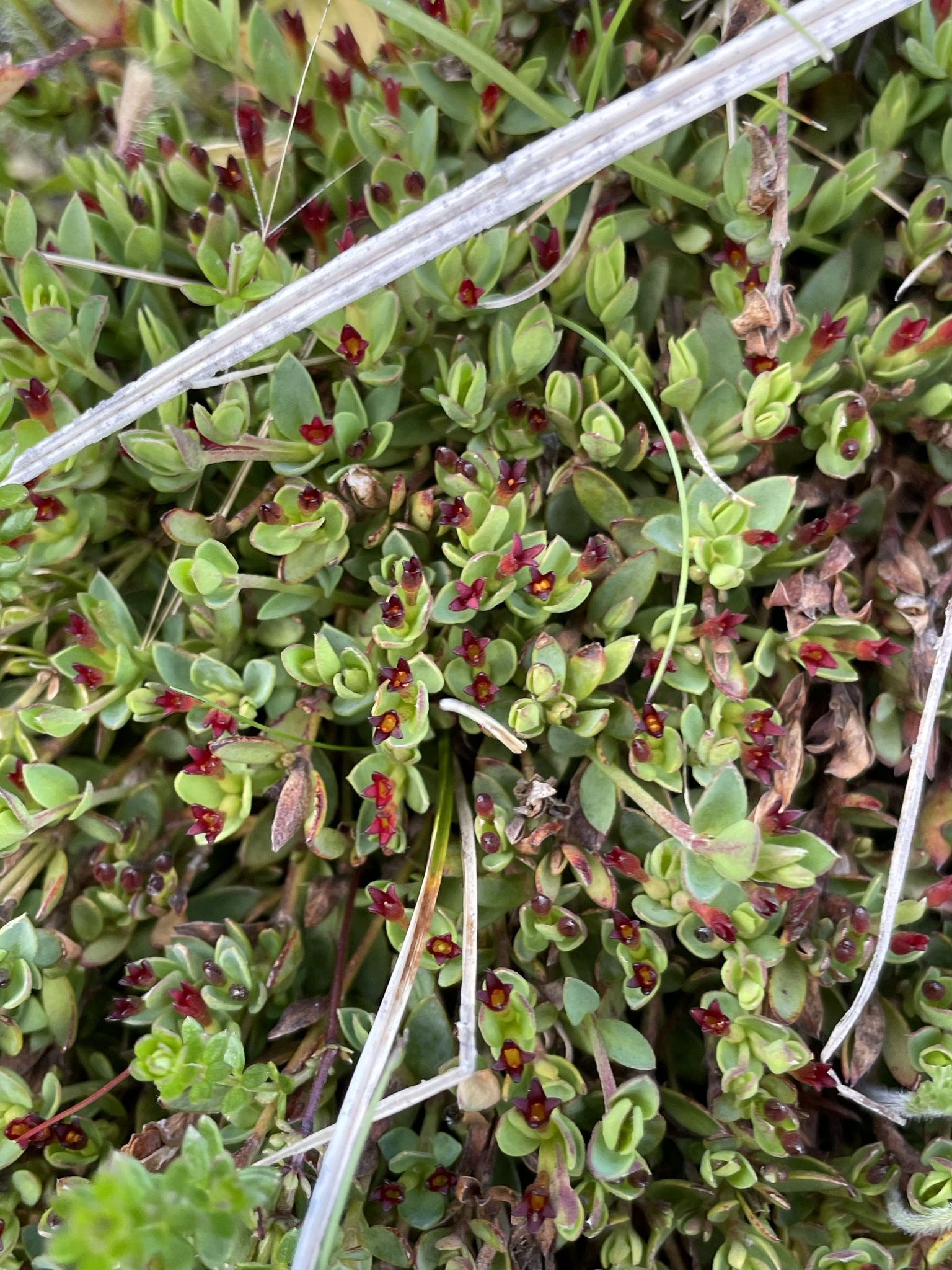

Scientific classification
- Kingdom: Plantae
- Clade: Tracheophytes
- Clade: Angiosperms
- Clade: Eudicots
- Clade: Rosids
- Order: Malvales
- Family: Thymelaeaceae
- Genus: Pimelea
- Species: P. biflora

Binomial name
- Pimelea biflora N.A.Wakef.

= Pimelea biflora =

Matted rice-flower

Species of shrub

Pimelea biflora, commonly known as matted rice-flower, is a species of flowering plant in the family Thymelaeaceae and is endemic to south-eastern continental Australia. It is a prostrate, mat-forming shrub with elliptic leaves and dark red flowers always arranged in pairs on the ends of branches.

== Description ==
Pimelea biflora is a prostrate, mat-forming shrub and has hairy young stems. The leaves are arranged in opposite pairs and are narrowly elliptic or elliptic, 2–10 mm (0.079–0.394 in) long, 1–5 mm (0.039–0.197 in) wide on a short petiole. The upper surface of the leaves is glabrous, the lower surface with short hairs pressed against the surface. The flowers are arranged in pairs on peduncles about 1 mm (0.039 in) long on the ends of branches, with two elliptic bracts 6–9 mm (0.24–0.35 in) long at the base. The flowers are dark red, but paler near the base. Flowering occurs from November to January and the fruit is green and about 4 mm (0.16 in) long.

== Taxonomy ==
Pimelea biflora was first formally described in 1957 by Norman Arthur Wakefield and the description was published in The Victorian Naturalist. The specific epithet (biflora) means "two-flowered".

== Distribution ==
Matted rice-flower grows in alpine and subalpine forest, heath, woodland and grassland south from Mount Gingera in the Australian Capital Territory, through southern New South Wales, to north-eastern Victoria.
