= Skiing in Tasmania =

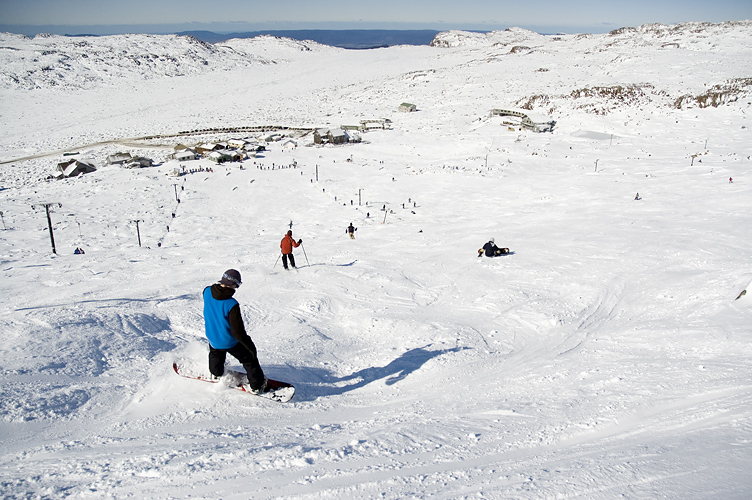
The Summit Run, Ben Lomond, Tasmania

Skiing in Tasmania takes place in the high country of the state of Tasmania, Australia, during the Southern Hemisphere winter. Cross country skiing is possible within the Tasmanian Wilderness and two small downhill ski-fields have been developed at Ben Lomond and Mount Mawson.

Mount Ossa is the highest point on the island at 1,617 metres (5,305 ft) above sea level, but Tasmania has eight mountains exceeding 1,500 metres (4,900 ft).

== History and major locations ==
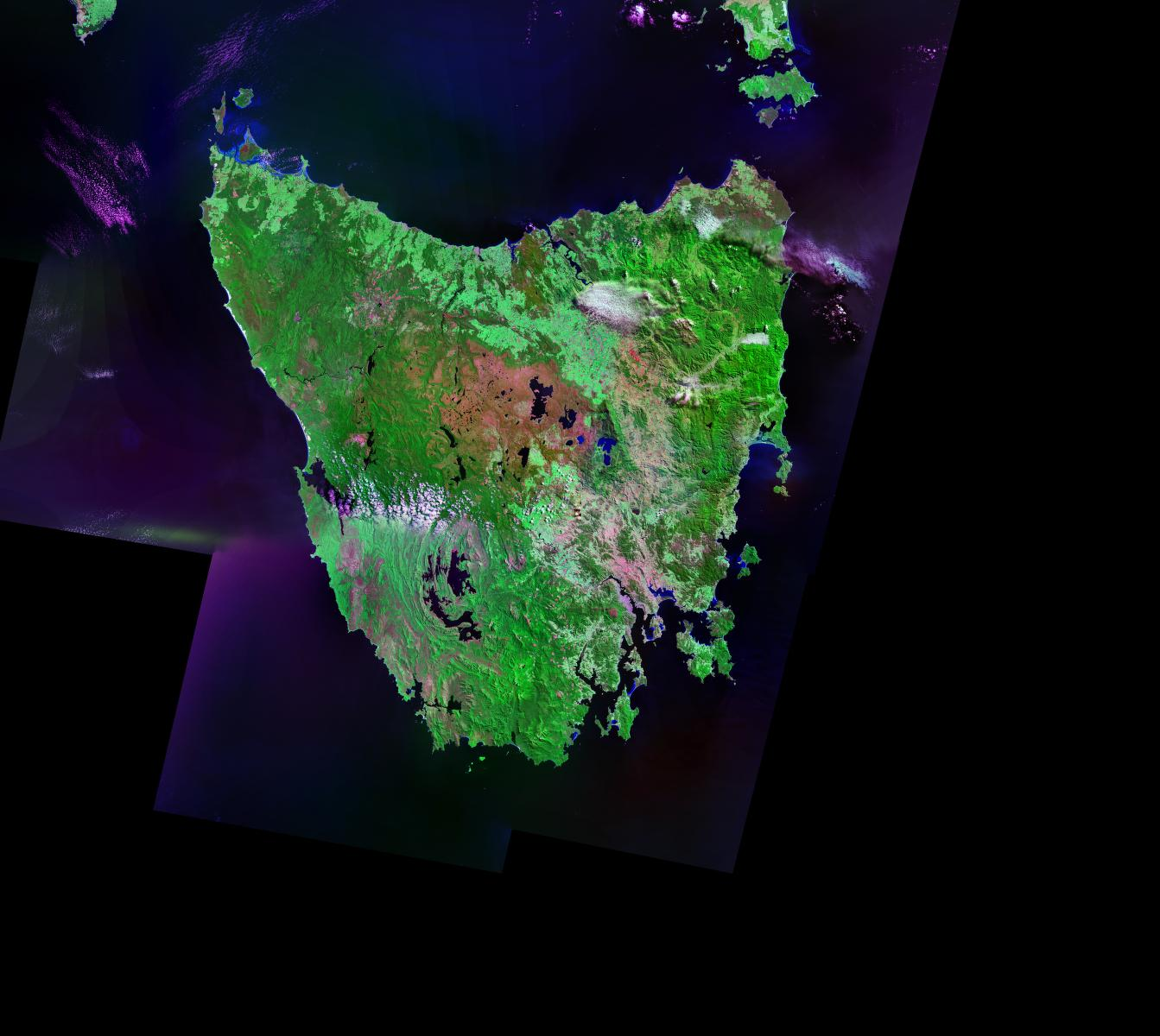
Tasmania is a mountainous island, south of the Australian mainland.

Skiing in Australia takes place in three States: New South Wales, Victoria and Tasmania; as well as in the Australian Capital Territory, during the Southern Hemisphere winter. Skiable terrain stretches through large areas of territory from June to October and a number of well serviced resorts have been developed, including: Thredbo, Perisher and Charlotte Pass in New South Wales; Mount Buller, Falls Creek and Mount Hotham in Victoria; as well as the small resorts of Ben Lomond and Mount Mawson in Tasmania.

The most southerly ski fields in Australia are located in Tasmania, a mountainous island off the southern coast of Eastern Australia. Much of the State is subject to at least occasional winter snows. Mount Ossa is the highest point on the island at 1,617 metres (5,305 ft) but Tasmania has eight mountains exceeding 1,500 metres (4,900 ft) and 28 above 1,220 metres (4,000 ft). Also notable is the Central Plateau, at an elevation of around 900 metres (3,000 ft). The capital city of Hobart is built at the base of Mount Wellington, which at 1,270 metres (4,170 ft), is snow-capped in winter.

== Downhill ski locations ==
=== Ben Lomond ===
Tasmania's premier alpine skiing operations are located at Ben Lomond, 60 kilometres (37 mi) from Launceston. Its season usually begins in mid-July and in peak season, its runs are served by six lifts.

Located in the Ben Lomond National Park, the village is at 1,460 metres (4,790 ft) and the top elevation is 1,570 metres (5,150 ft). The Northern Tasmanian Alpine Club formed in 1929 and pioneered trips to the mountain, and improved the access track. In 1932, a chalet was built at Carr Villa, and construction of a road from Upper Blessington to Carr Villa began soon after. It was finally completed in 1953.

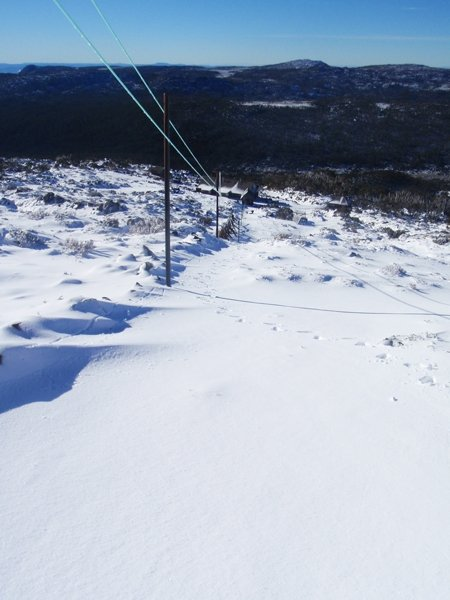
Top of Mount Mawson tow, Tasmania

In 1950 a Parliamentary Standing Committee recommended that Ben Lomond be developed as a ski resort. The Australian National Championships were held at the site in 1955. In 1963 the access road was extended to the top of the plateau via the steep and scenic "Jacobs Ladder". Subsequent developments have included new ski lifts, visitor facilities, a licensed inn and accommodation, sewerage system, and improved access. The Ben Lomond Skifield Management Authority was formed in 1995 to manage the Skifield Development Area. Today, a number of club lodges provide accommodation and the mountain has fine views which stretch to the ocean.

In 2010, the Department of Parks and Wildlife released a plan for the Ben Lomond ski area recommending snow making machines, the enhancement of snow play areas and the development of a possible snow board park. Season 2011 saw the successful addition of a Super Wizard snowmaking machine at Ben Lomond, with an additional Super Wizard added for season 2012.

=== Mount Mawson ===
Limited downhill ski operations also exist in the Mount Field National Park at Mount Mawson, which is approximately 89 kilometres north west of Hobart and rises from 1,200 to 1,320 metres (3,940 to 4,330 ft) above sea level. Mount Mawson is a small club field, located thirty minutes walk from its carpark. Mawson has three lifts: two intermediate rope tows and a third steep incline rope tow accessing steep terrain. A small amount of club accommodation is available and there are some self-catering huts in the National Park.

== Cross country and back country ski locations ==
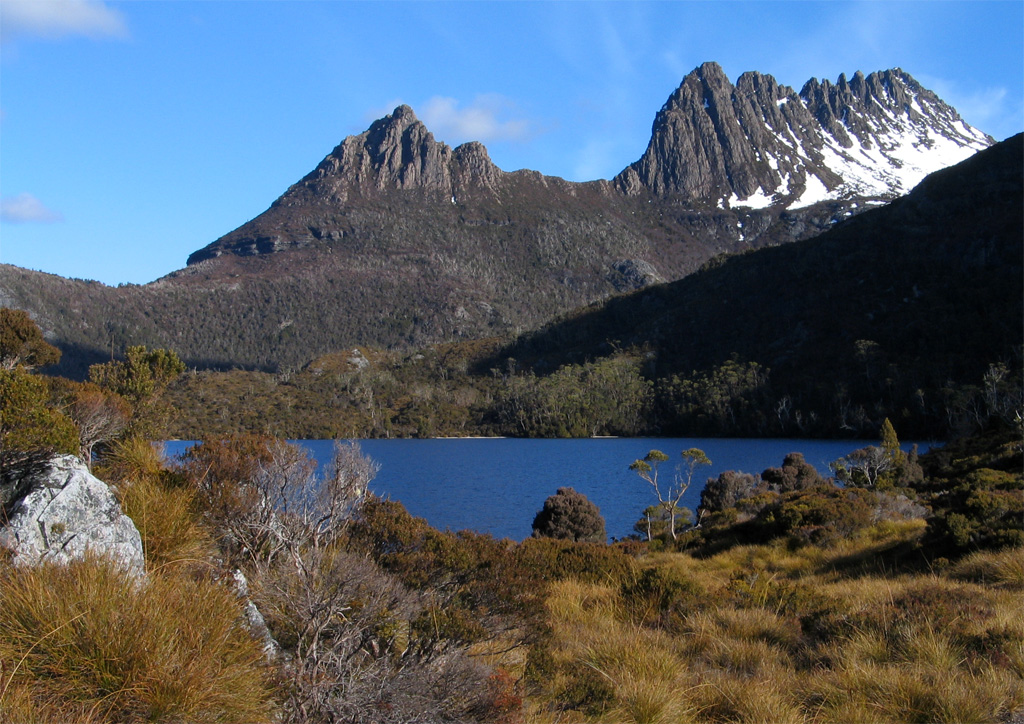
Cradle Mountain in Tasmania's UNESCO World Heritage Wilderness Area

When conditions allow, Tasmania's rugged conditions offers cross country skiers some scenic terrain. One of Australia's most scenic alpine locations is located in Tasmania at Cradle Mountain, where cross country skiing can be possible, when conditions allow. Cradle Mountain is part of the Tasmanian Wilderness World Heritage Area, inscribed by UNESCO in 1982. Tasmania has 28 mountains above 1,220m and much of the island is subject to at least occasional winter snow.

The Australian High Country is populated by unique flora and fauna including wombats, wallabies, echidnas, and the snow gums. The alpine regions are subject to environmental protection, which has limited the scope of commercial development of skiiable terrain, however Australia has extensive cross country skiing terrain.

Other cross country and back country skiing locations can be found in the Cradle Mountain-Lake St Clair National Park, the Ben Lomond National Park, the Mount Field National Park, and the Walls of Jerusalem National Park.

== Gallery ==
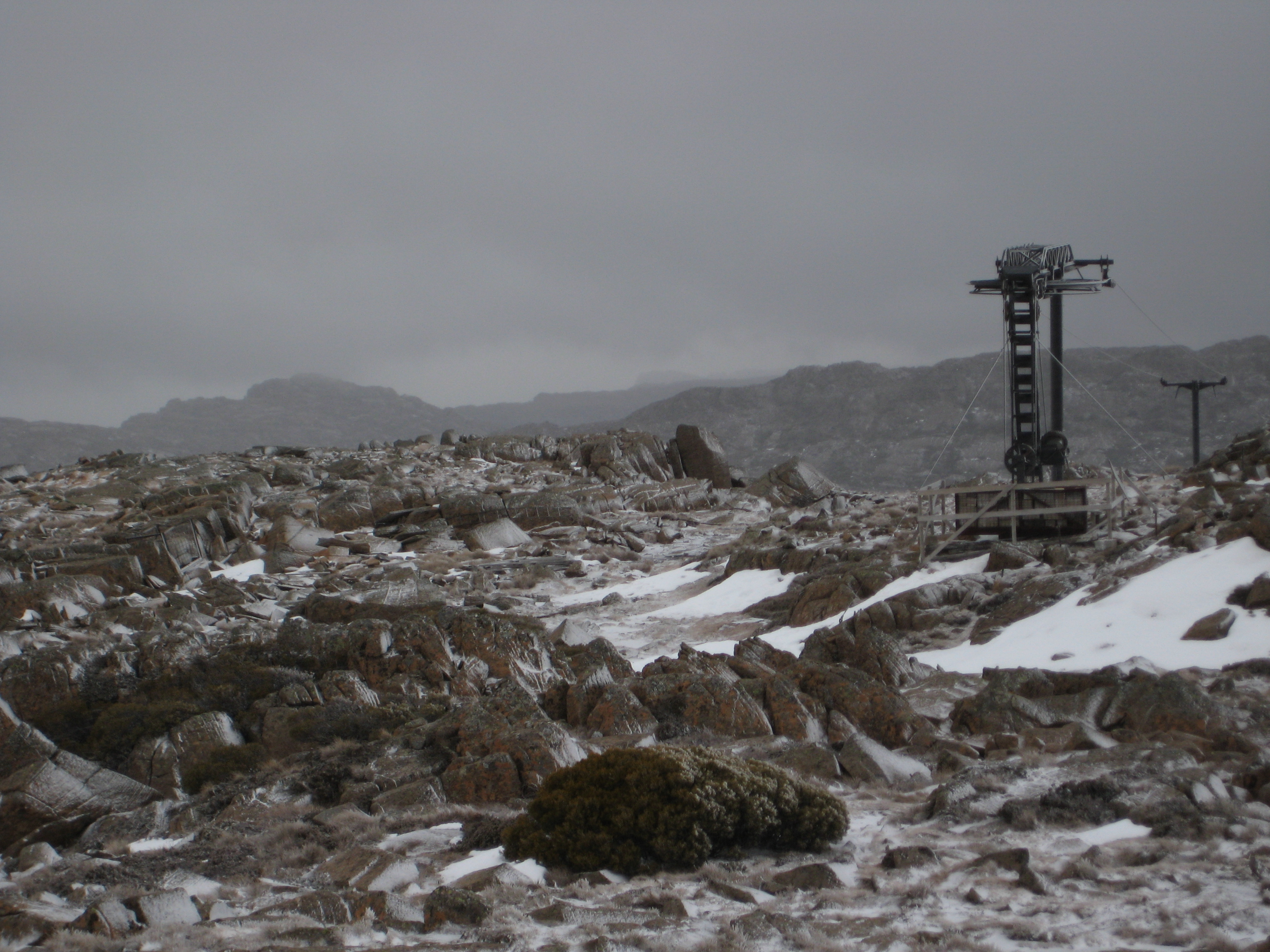
Legges Tor from the summit looking towards the Ben Lomond Ski Resort

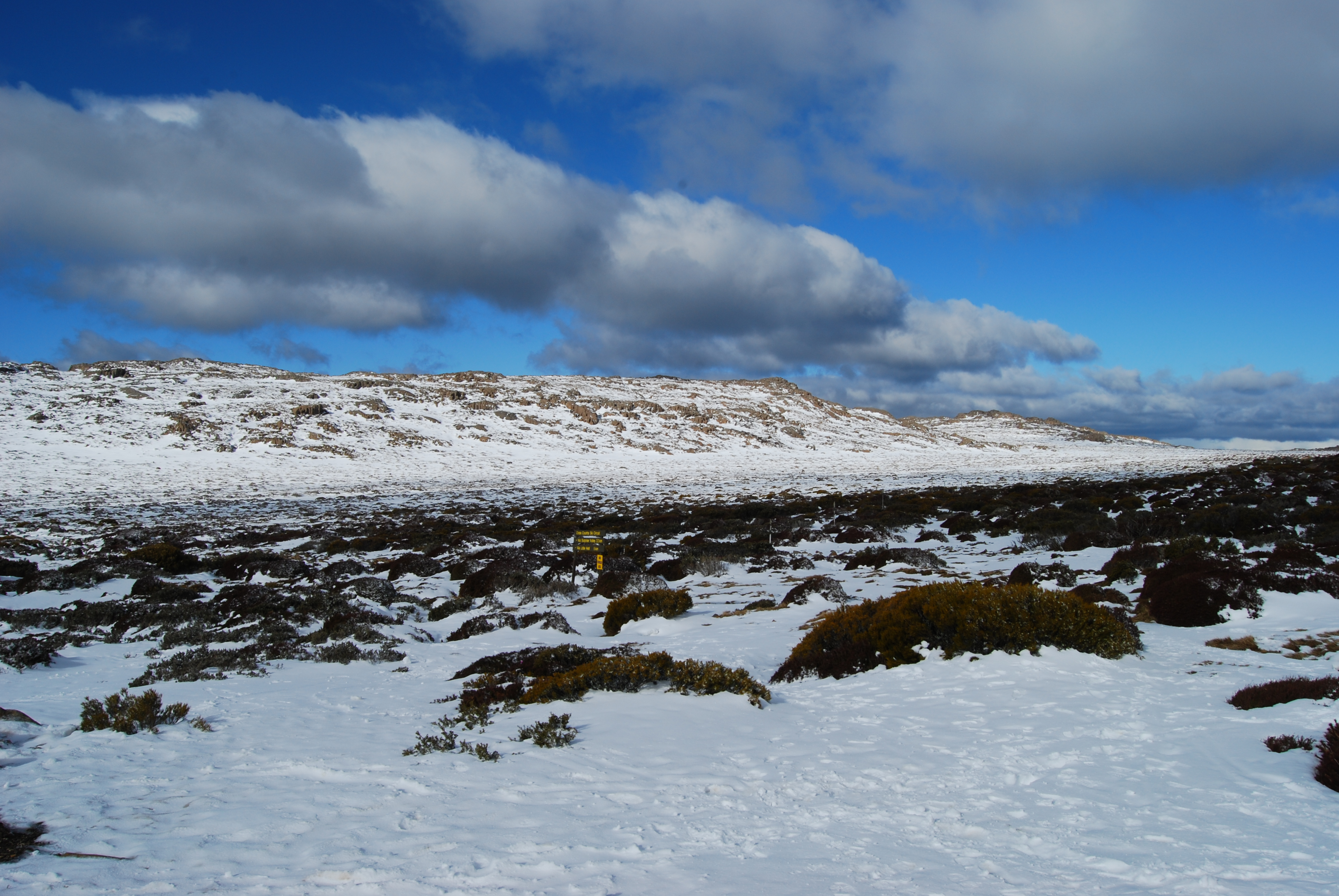
Ben Lomond snowfields

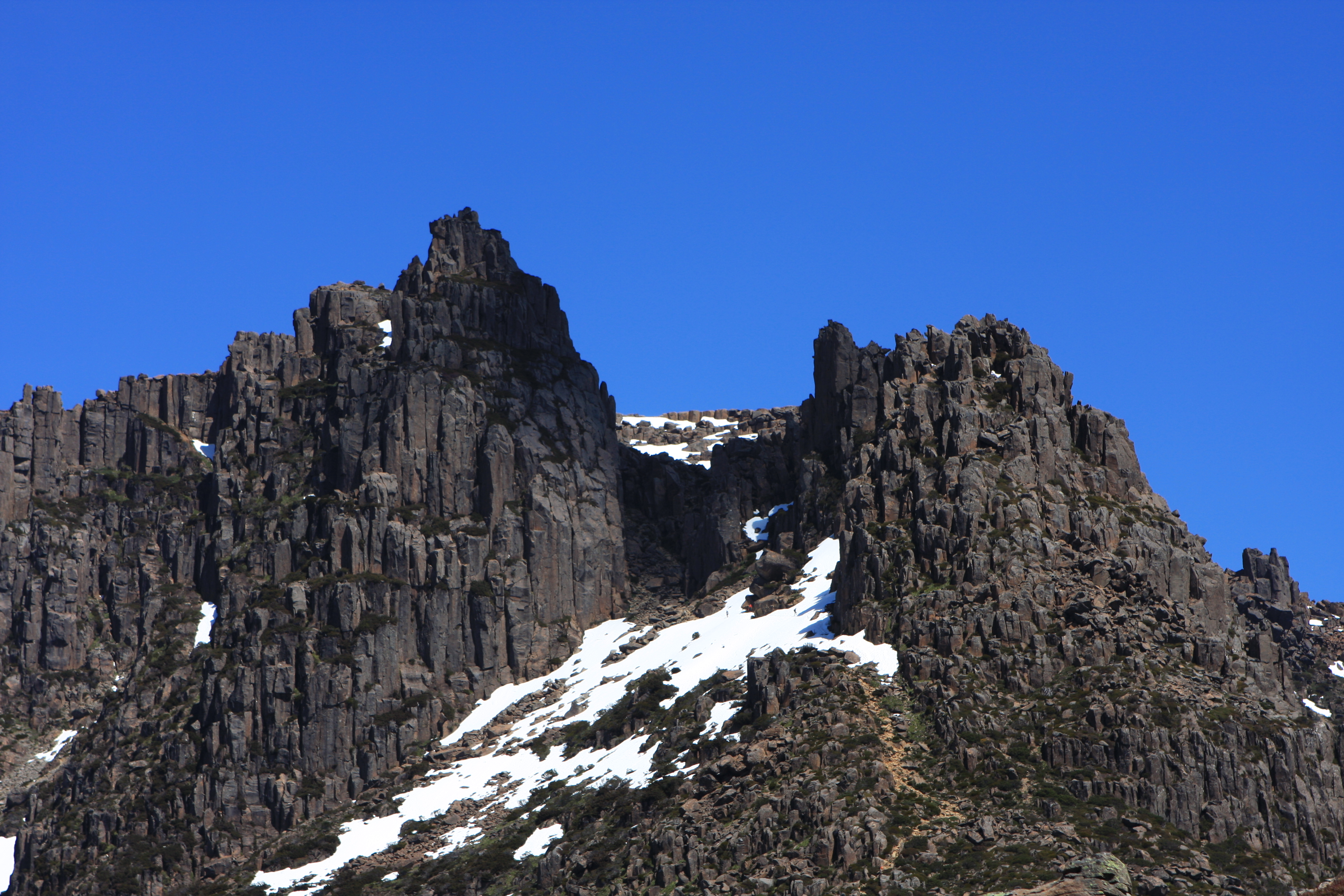
Summit of Mount Ossa, Tasmania's highest mountain

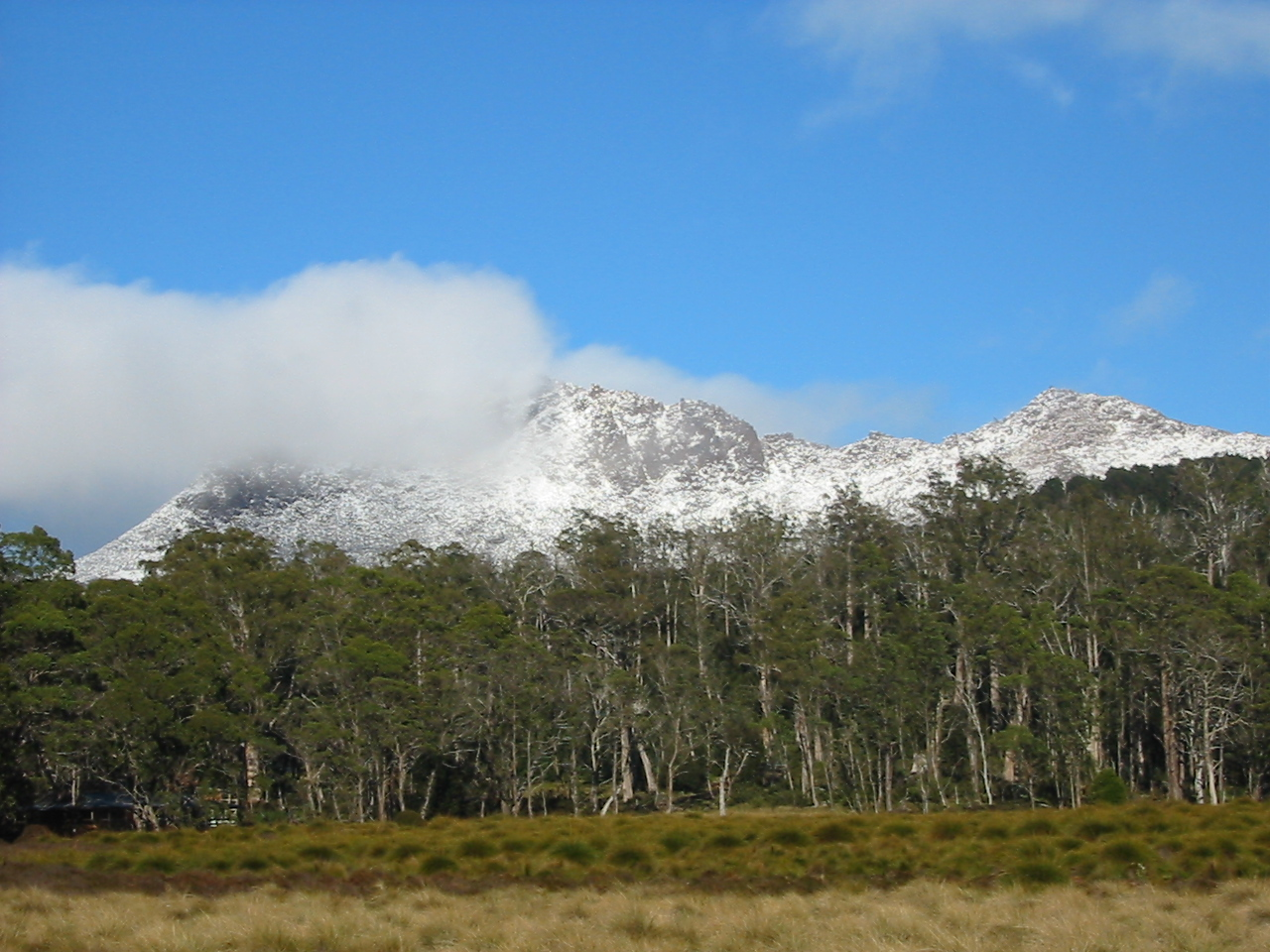
Mount Ossa from Pelion Plains
- List of highest mountains of Tasmania
- Skiing in Australia
- Skiing in New South Wales
- Skiing in Victoria, Australia
- Skiing in the Australian Capital Territory
- List of ski areas and resorts in Australia
- Winter sport in Australia
