= Mount Gingera =

Mountain in the Brindabella Range, Australia

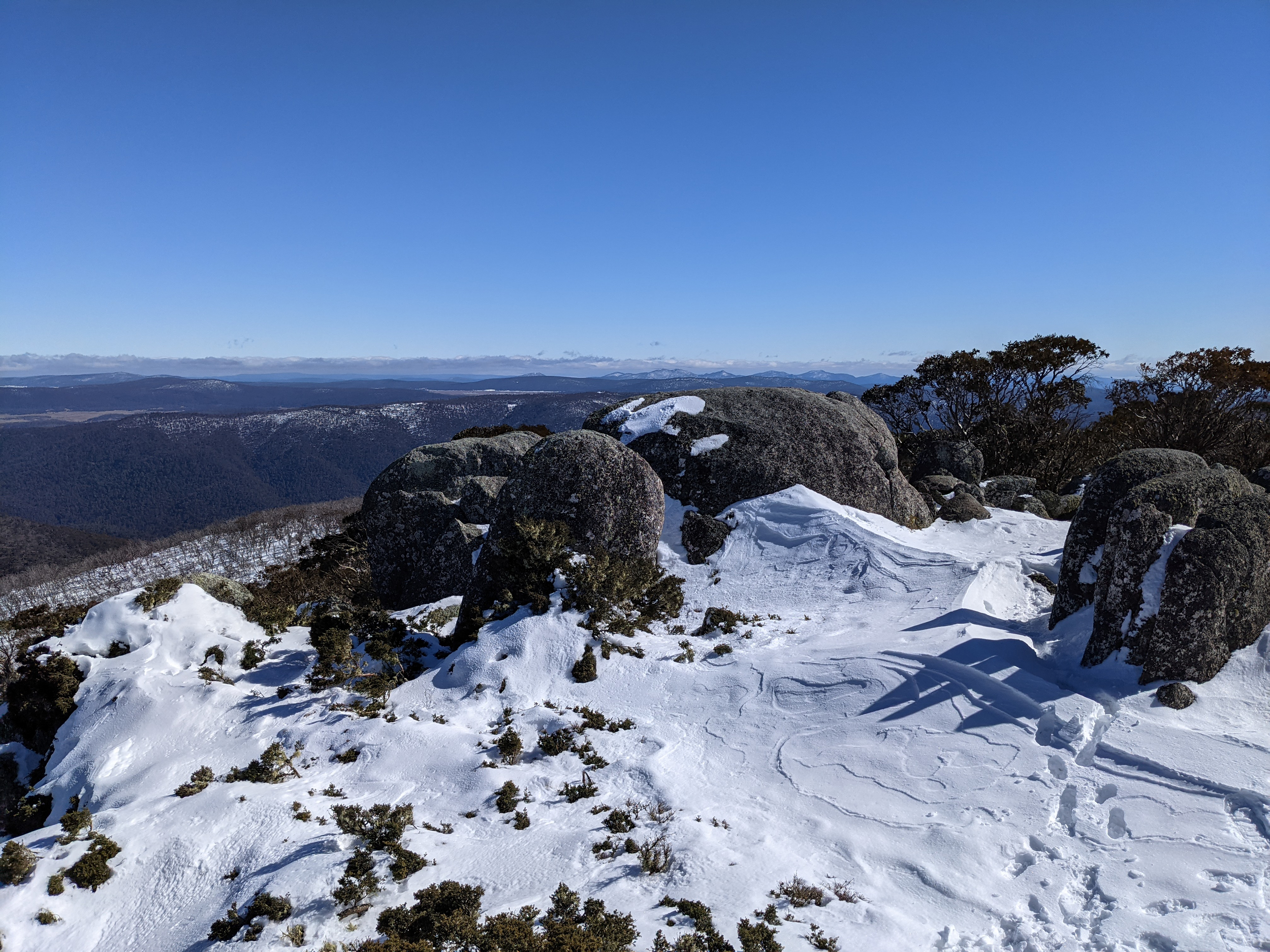
- Mount Gingera's summit in winter

Highest point
- Elevation: 1,857 m (6,093 ft)
- Prominence: 357 m (1,171 ft)
- Coordinates: 35°35′S 148°47′E

Geography
- Location within Australian Capital Territory
- Location: Australian Capital Territory / New South Wales, Australia
- Parent range: Brindabella Range

Mount Gingera is a mountain with an elevation of 1,857 metres (6,093 ft) AHD located within the Brindabella Range on the border between the Australian Capital Territory and New South Wales in Australia. The summit of the mountain is located within the ACT, and is the second highest peak in the territory.

The mountain is the most prominent snow-covered peak to be seen from Canberra in winter. It is located on the border between New South Wales and the ACT, the NSW portion in Bimberi Nature Reserve and the ACT portion in Namadgi National Park. The sub-alpine sphagnum bogs on the flanks of Mount Gingera and nearby Mount Ginini to the north are known habitats of the endangered Northern Corroboree Frog (Pseudophryne pengilleyi).

== Route ==
Mount Gingera may be reached by walking from Corin Dam up and along Stockyard Spur to its junction with the Mount Franklin Road. Continue south along the road, passing Pryors Hut before either following a track or simply climbing the moderate eastern slope. Alternatively you can approach the mountain by driving via the Mount Franklin Road and parking a vehicle at Mount Ginini before continuing on foot. In winter this road will generally be closed at Mount Franklin due to snow and it offers the northernmost cross country skiing terrain in the Australian Alps.

== See also ==
- Skiing in the Australian Capital Territory
- Skiing in Australia
- List of mountains in Australia
- Mount Franklin
- Mount Ginini
