= Skiing in Victoria =

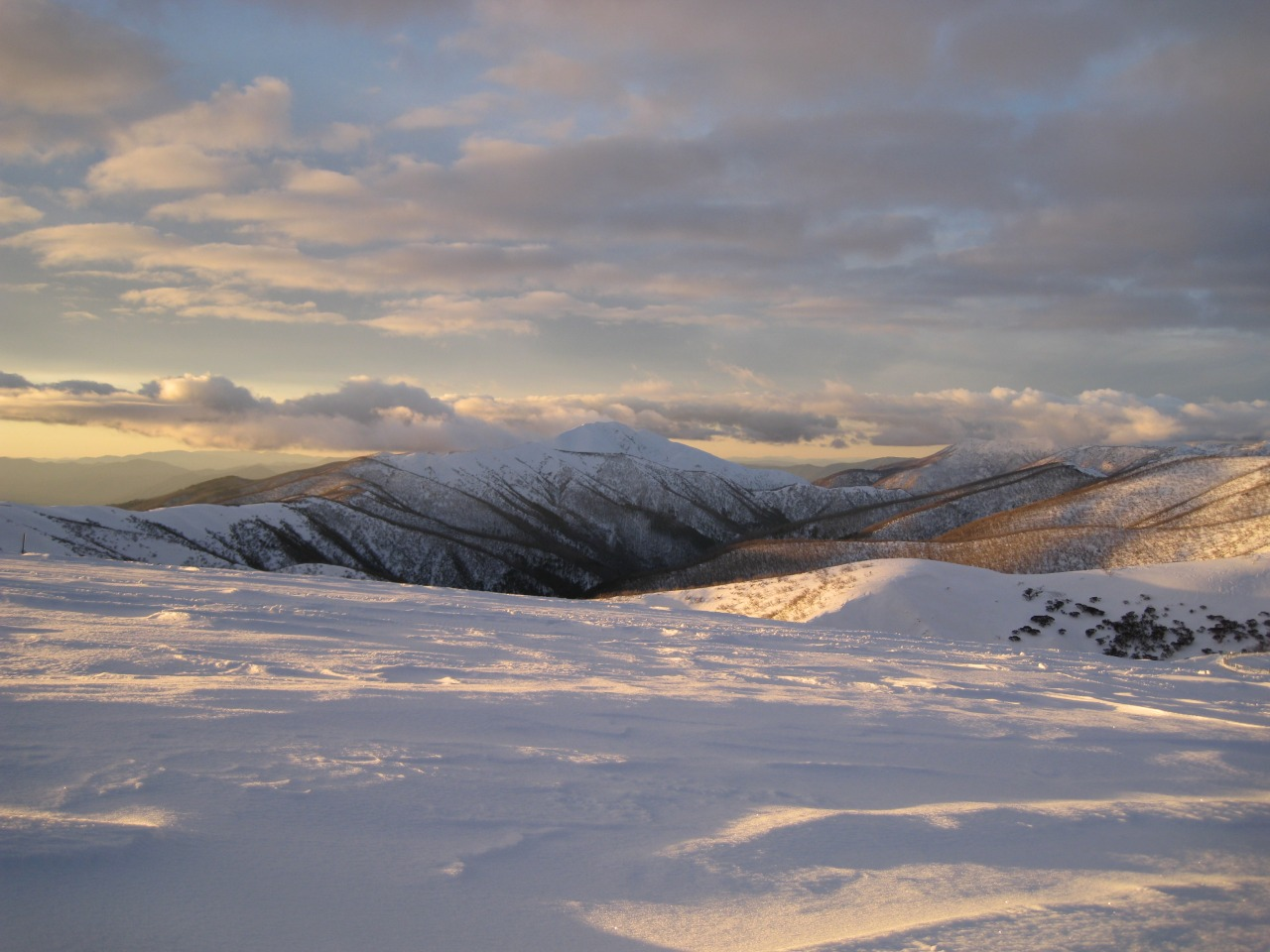
Mount Feathertop, Victoria, 1922m, seen from Mount Hotham

Skiing in Victoria, Australia takes place in the Australian Alps located in the State of Victoria during the Southern Hemisphere winter. Victoria is the State with the greatest number of ski resorts in Australia. The highest peak in Victoria is Mount Bogong at 1986m. The first ski tow was constructed near Mount Buffalo in 1938. Victoria has a number of well developed ski resorts including Mount Hotham, Falls Creek and Mount Buller. Cross country skiing is popular in such national parks as Mount Buffalo National Park and Alpine National Park.

== Overview ==
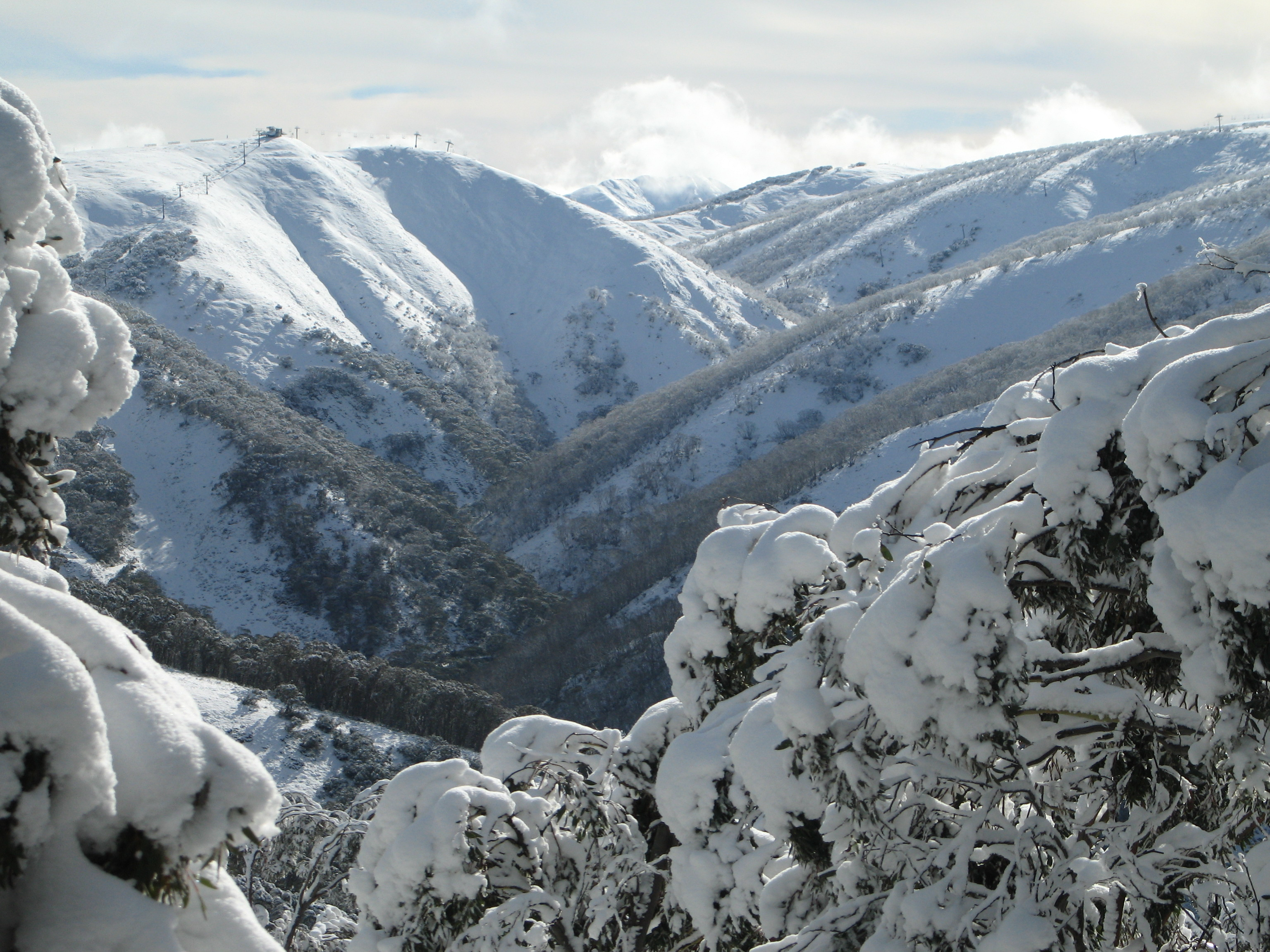
Mount Hotham Victoria

A hospice was built at Mount Saint Bernard (Elevation 1540) around 1863 along a track developed to link the Victorian gold fields. Snowshoes were developed locally to assist winter travellers and a larger hospice built around 1884. Recreational and practical skiing was being practised in the area by the 1880s and 90s with skis made from local timbers, and making use of single steering poles. The first winter traverse of the Victorian Alps was made in 1900, via the Hospice and Mount Hotham. The Hospice operated as a recreational ski location into the 1930s, but was destroyed by bushfire in 1939.

Skiing began at Mount Buffalo in the 1890s and the Mount Buffalo Chalet in Victoria was constructed in 1910. Australia's first ski tow was constructed near Mount Buffalo in 1938. Buffalo's first ski lodge was built at Dingo Dell in 1954. A bushfire in 2006 forced the temporary closure of the resort and negotiations are continuing over a new lease on the property. A stone cottage was built at Mount Hotham in 1925 to cater for a growing interest in sport of skiing and a Club was built in 1944 with the first ski tow installed in 1951. A ski hut was erected at Mount Baw Baw, just 120 km East of Melbourne, in 1945 and a ski rope tow added in 1955. The first ski lift went into service at Mount Buller in 1949, and in the same year rope tow was installed at Falls Creek. In 1957, Australia's first chairlift was installed at Falls Creek, and the area is today the largest ski resort in Victoria.

The Mount Buller Interschools Event claims to be the largest interdisciplinary snow-sports event on earth. In 2008 it attracted 3500 participants.

Snow play is also available at Mount Donna Buang.

=== Cross Country & Back Country Skiing ===
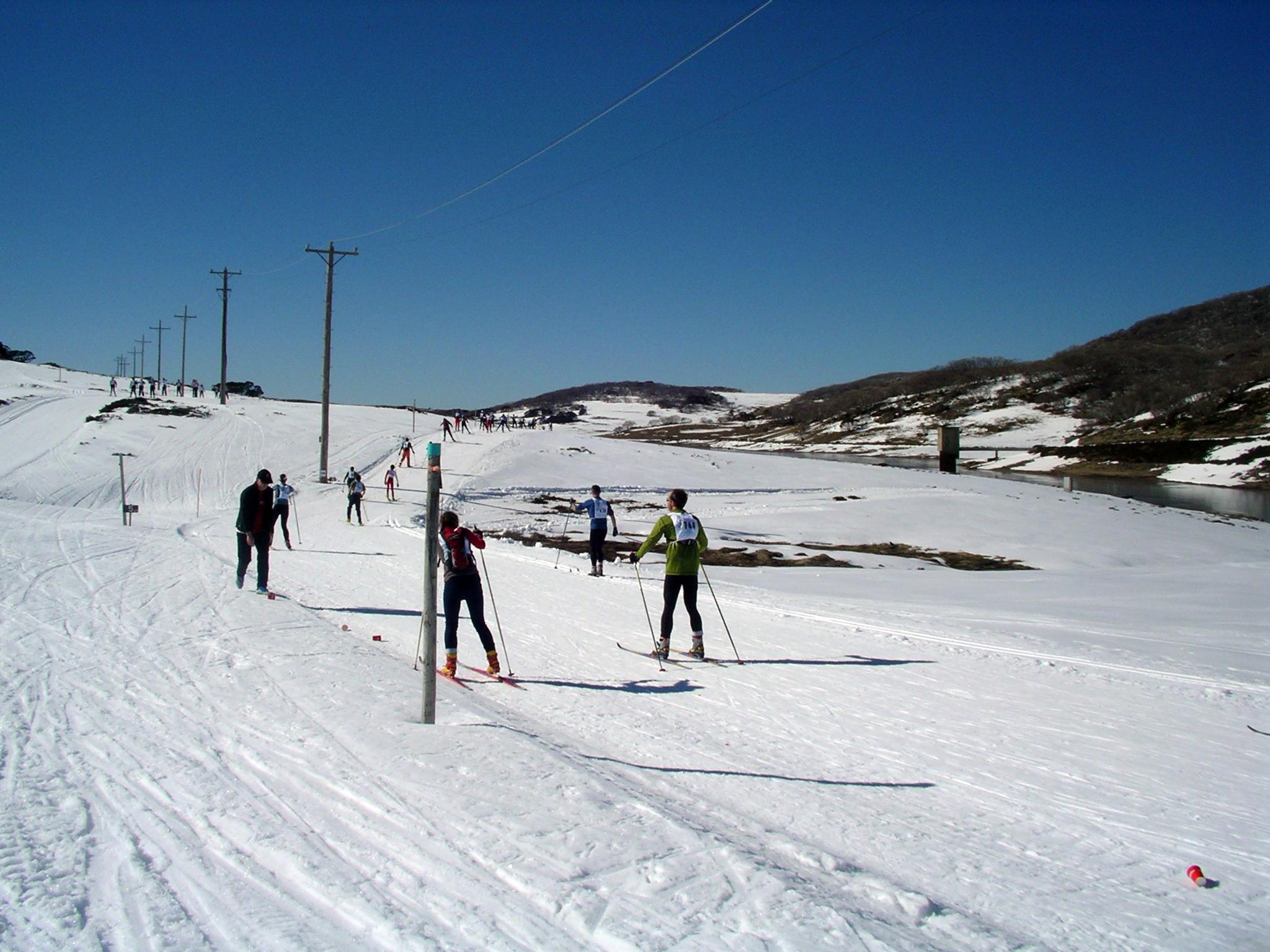
The Kangaroo Hoppet, an annual 42km Cross Country Ski Race, at Falls Creek, Victoria

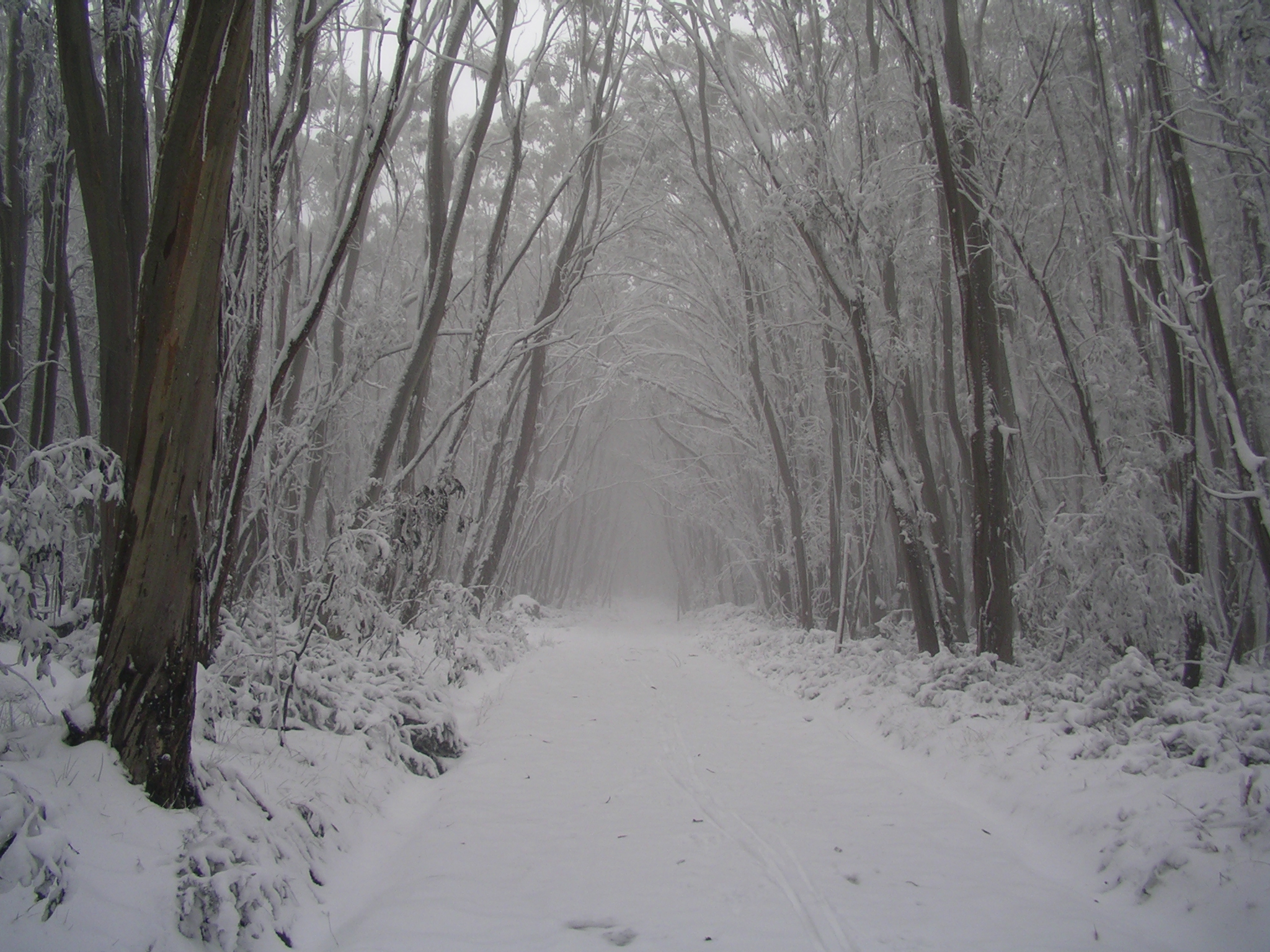
A trail at Lake Mountain cross country ski resort, Victoria

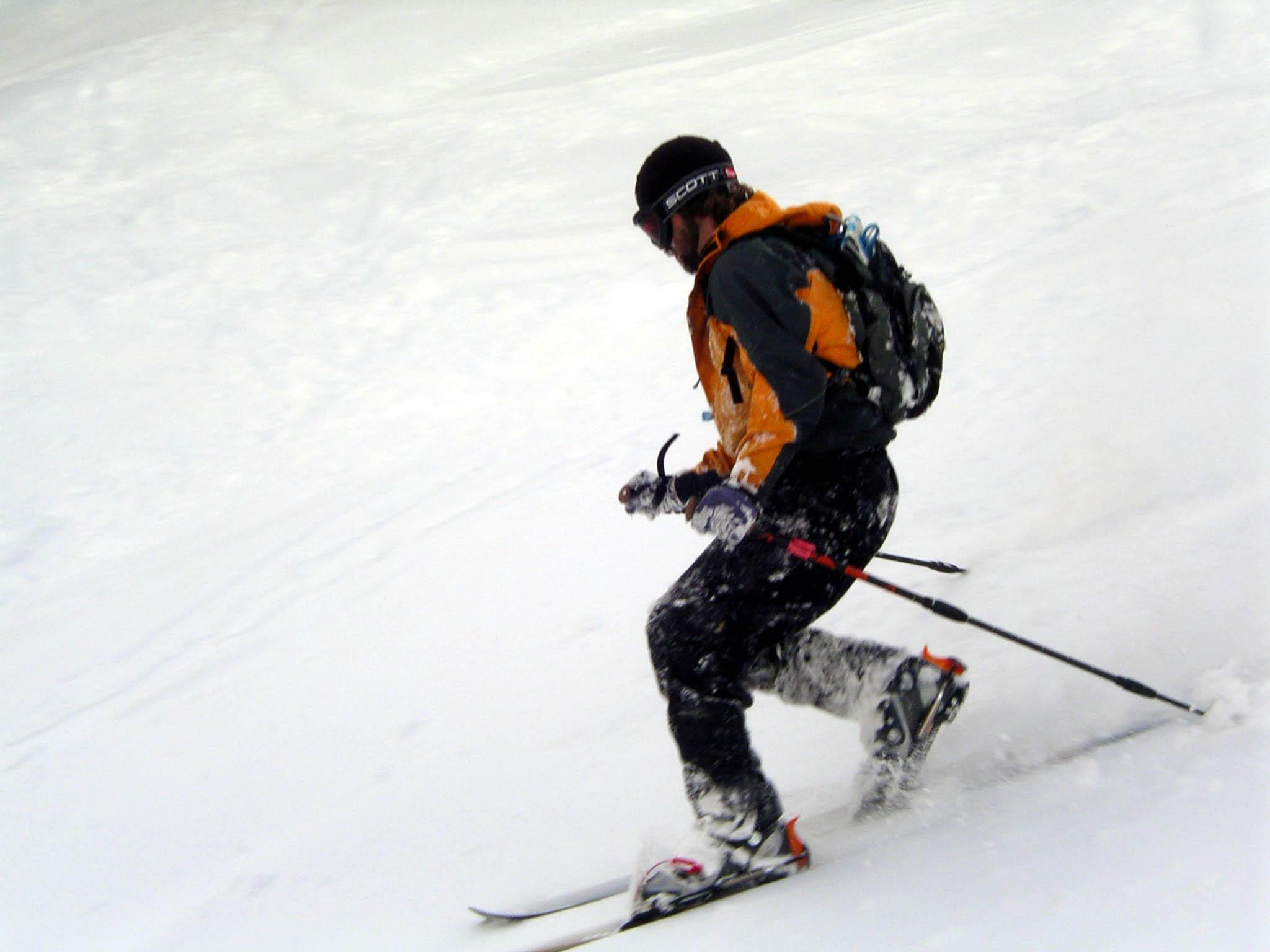
Telemark skier at Mount Stirling cross country ski resort

Dedicated Cross Country ski resorts are located at Lake Mountain, Mount Stirling and Mount St Gwinear in Victoria and popular areas for back country skiing and ski touring in the Alpine National Park, Yarra Ranges National Park and the Baw Baw National Park include: Mount Bogong, Mount Feathertop, Bogong High Plains, Mount Howitt, Mount Reynard and Snowy Plains. The Kangaroo Hoppet is a leg of the Worldloppet cross-country race series which is conducted on the last Saturday of August each year, hosted by Falls Creek in Victoria. The showpiece 42-kilometre race attracts thousands of spectators and competitors.

The Australian High Country is populated by unique flora and fauna including wombats, wallabies, echidnas, and the snow gum. The Alpine regions are subject to environmental protection, which has limited the scope of commercial development of skiable terrain, however Australia has extensive cross country skiing terrain.

== Ski areas ==
=== Downhill ski resorts ===
- Mount Hotham
- Falls Creek
- Mount Buller
- Mount Baw Baw Alpine Resort
- Mount Buffalo (backcountry skiing)

=== Cross country resorts ===
- Lake Mountain
- Mount St Gwinear
- Mount Stirling
- Mount Buffalo
- Mount Donna Buang (mostly tourist snow)

=== Resorts proposed for development that never occurred ===
- Mount Torbreck
- Mount Stirling (downhill skiing proposal)

=== Back country ski areas ===
Popular areas for back country skiing and ski touring in the Alpine National Park, Mount Buffalo National Park, Yarra Ranges National Park and the Baw Baw National Park include:

- Mount Bogong
- Bogong High Plains
- Mount Feathertop
- Mount Buffalo
- Mount Stirling
- Mount Howitt
- Mount Reynard
- Snowy Plains

== Gallery ==
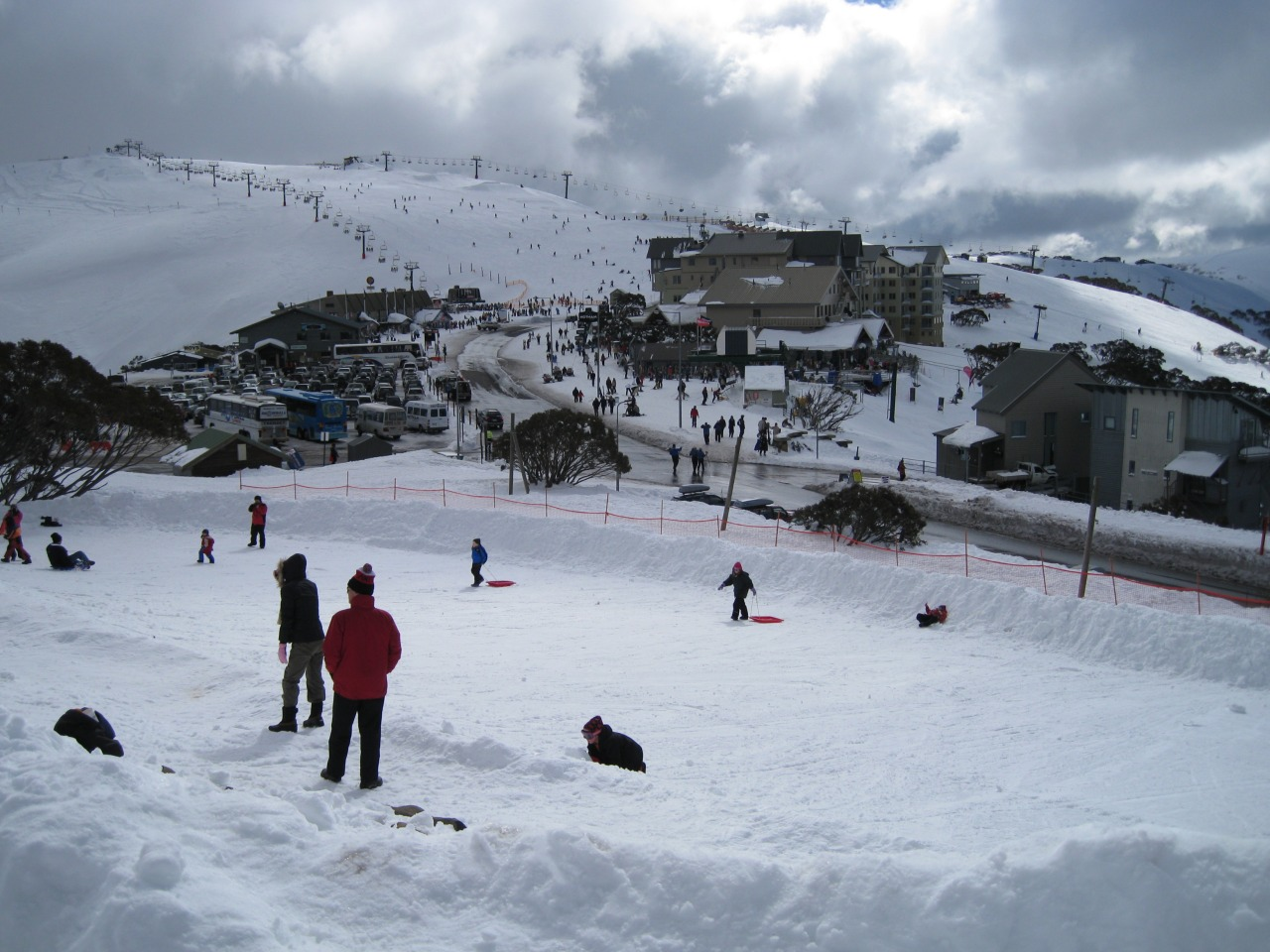
Mount Hotham Village

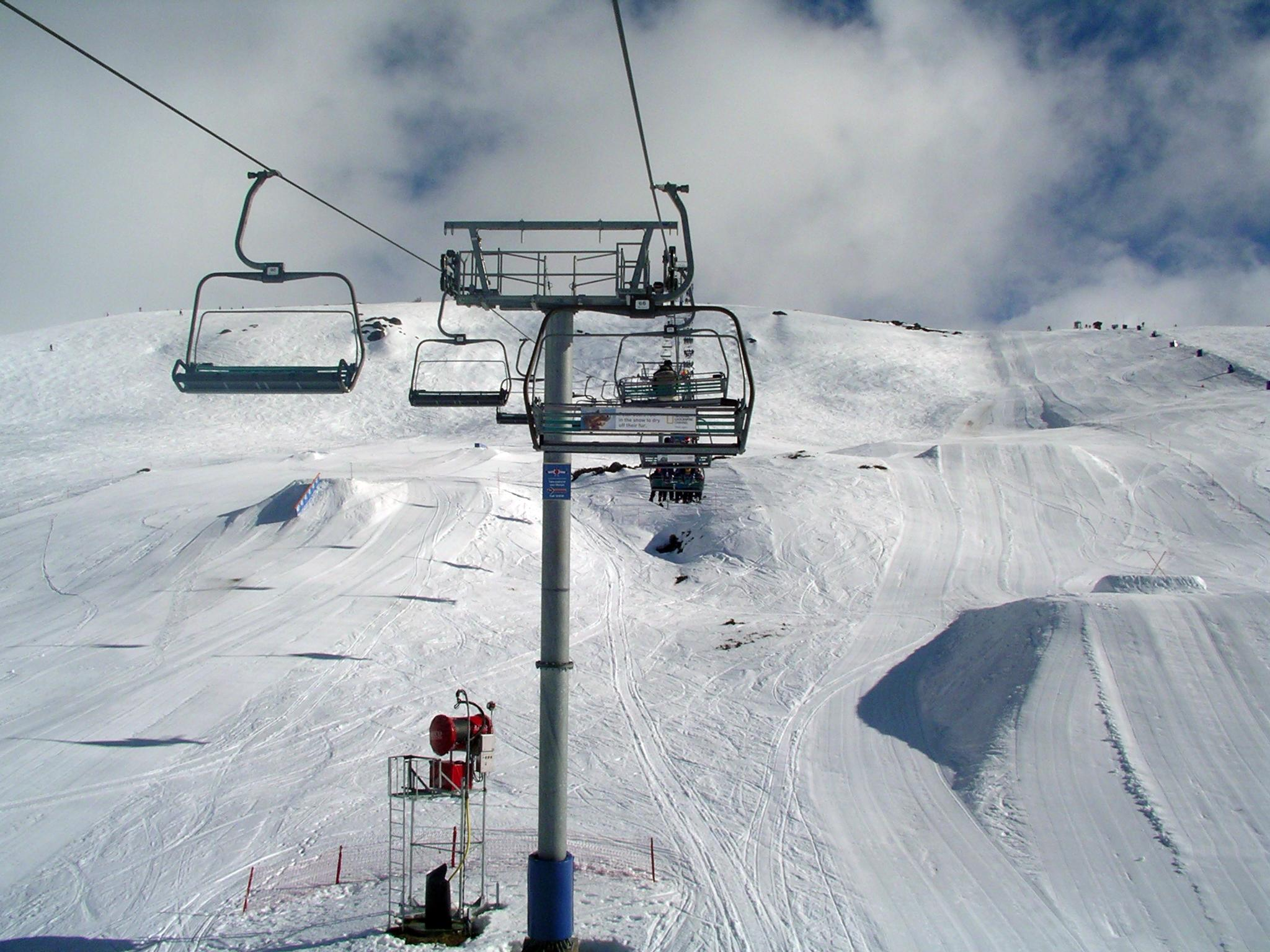
The Ruined Castle chairlift and terrain park, Falls Creek, Victoria

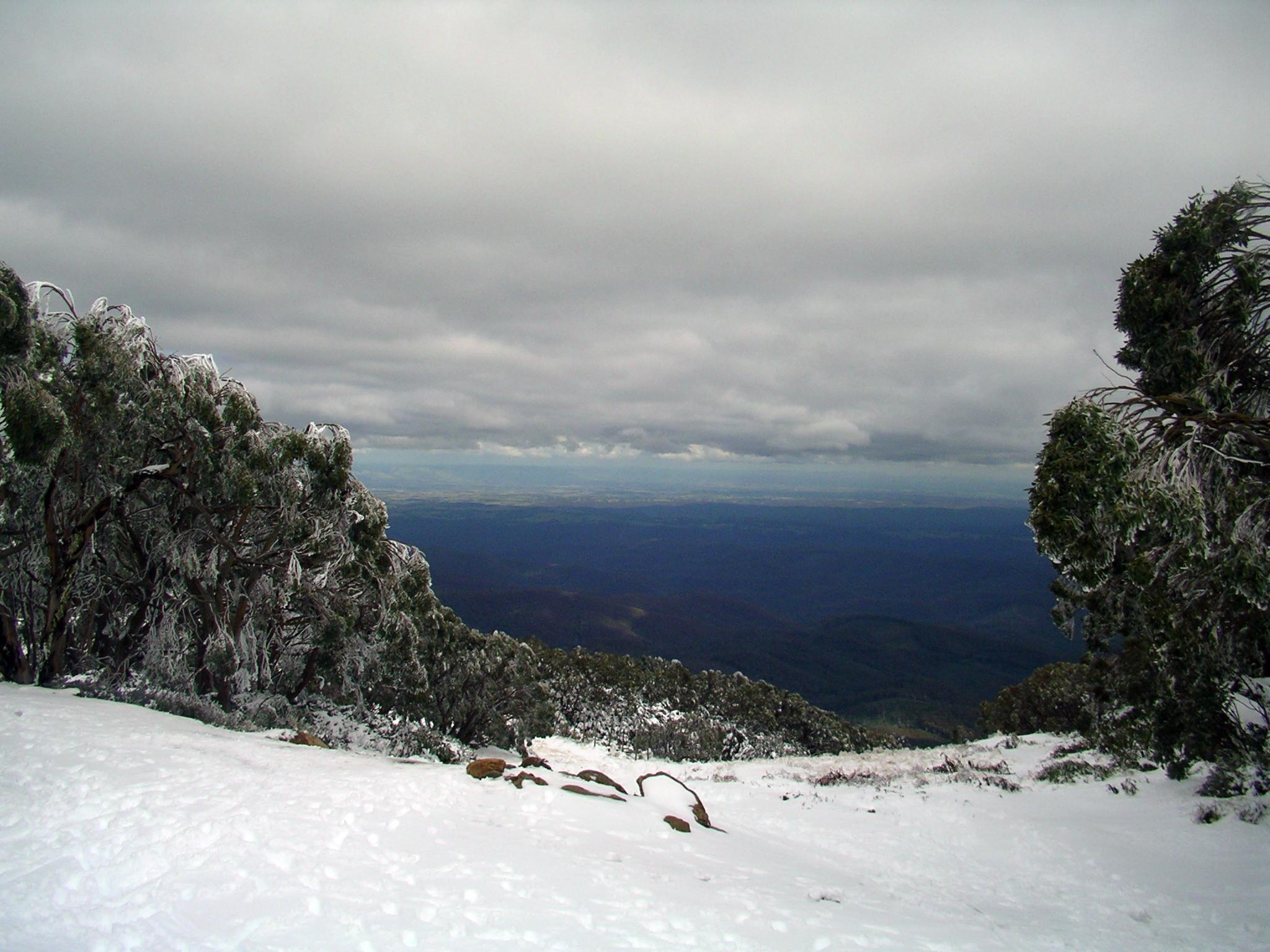
The view across Gippsland from Mount Baw Baw, Victoria

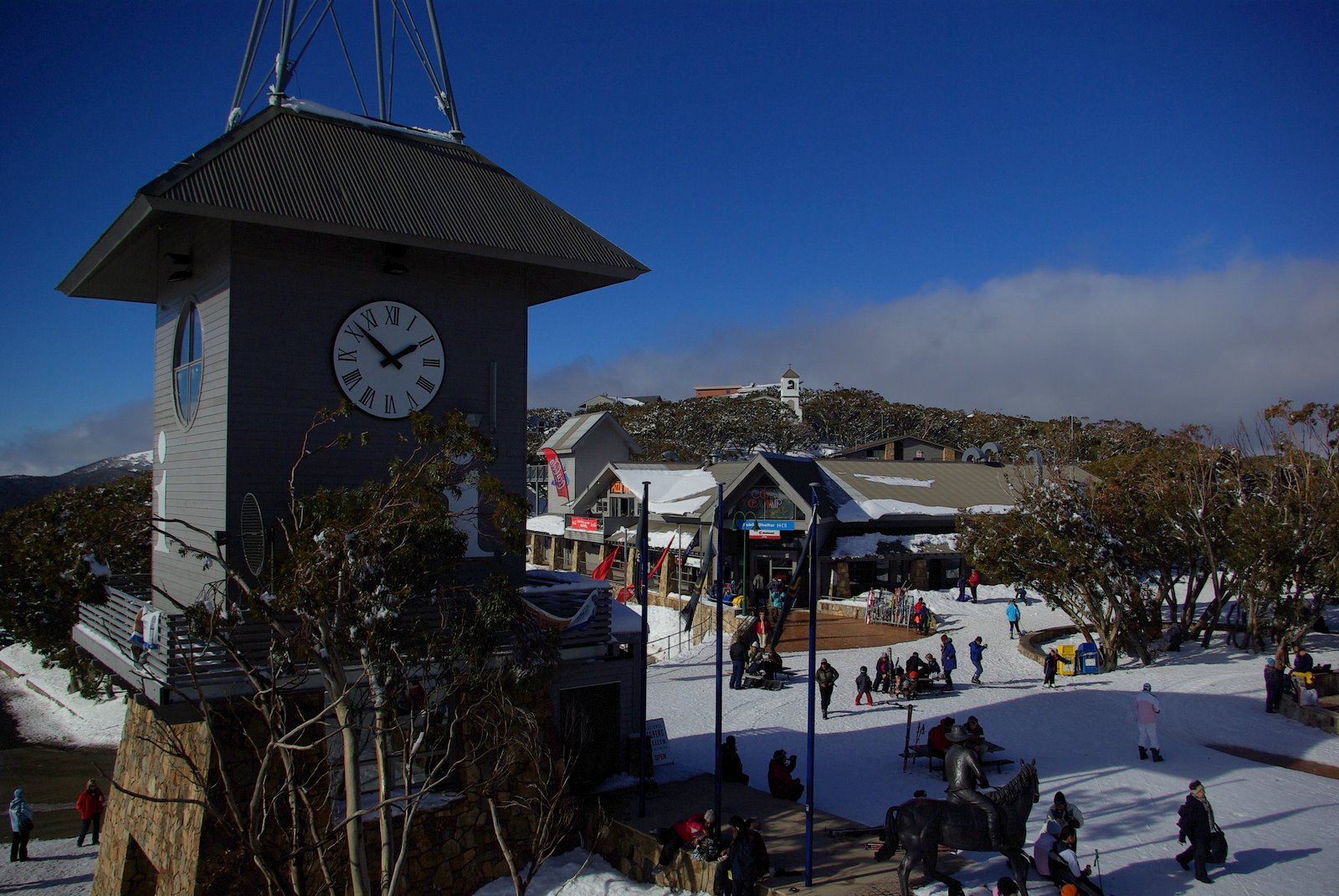
Mount Buller village, Victoria.

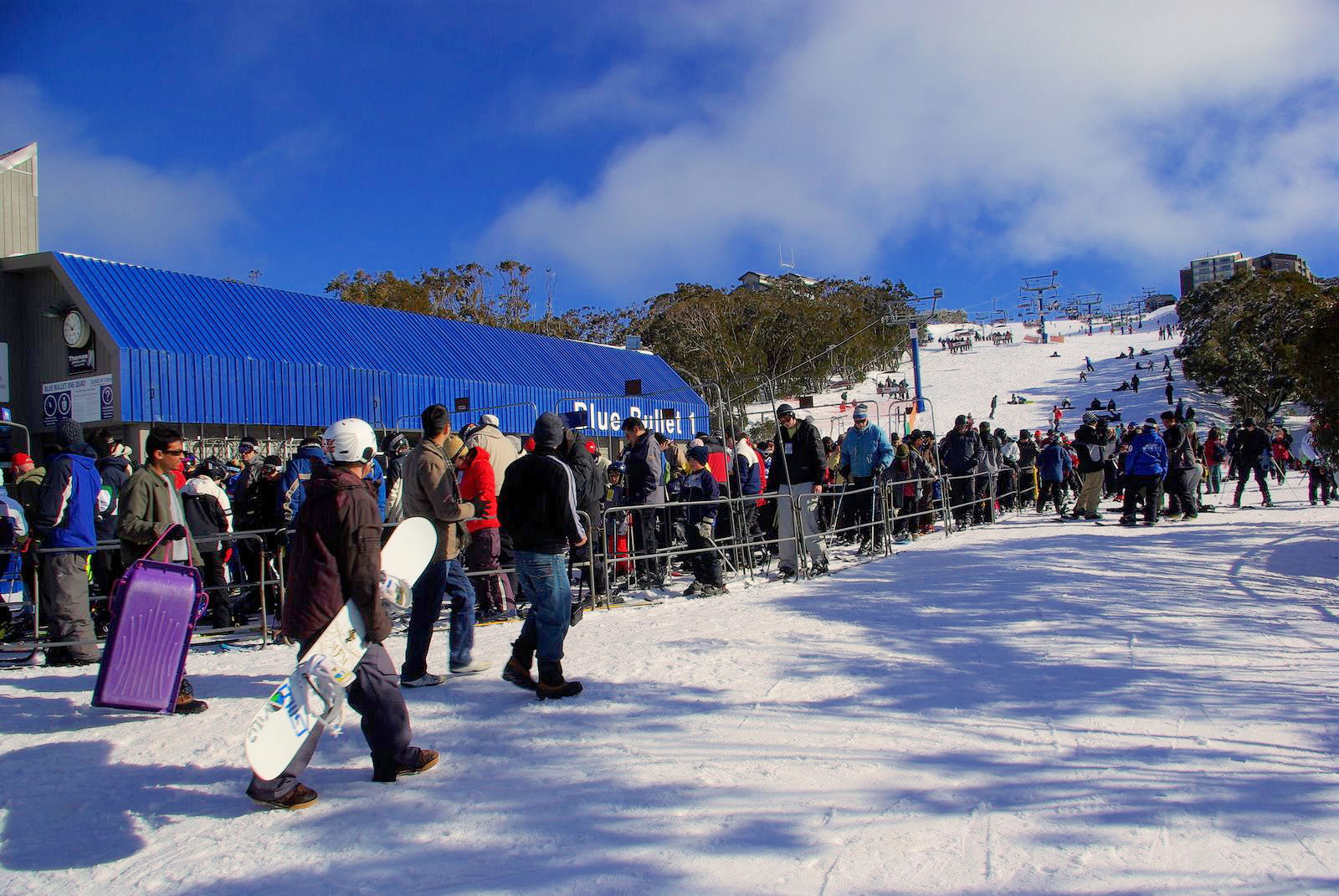
Bourke Street, Mount Buller

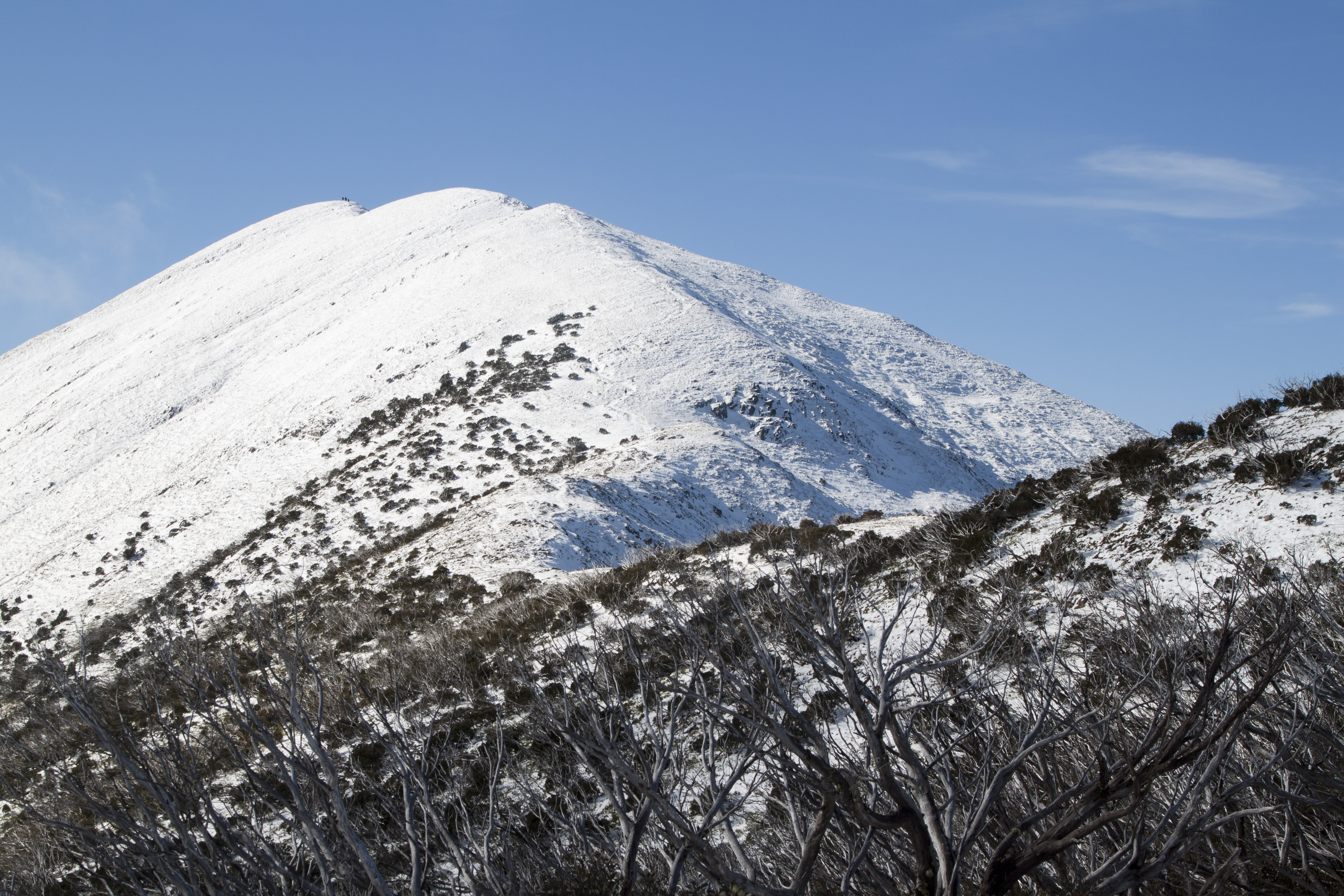
Mount Feathertop

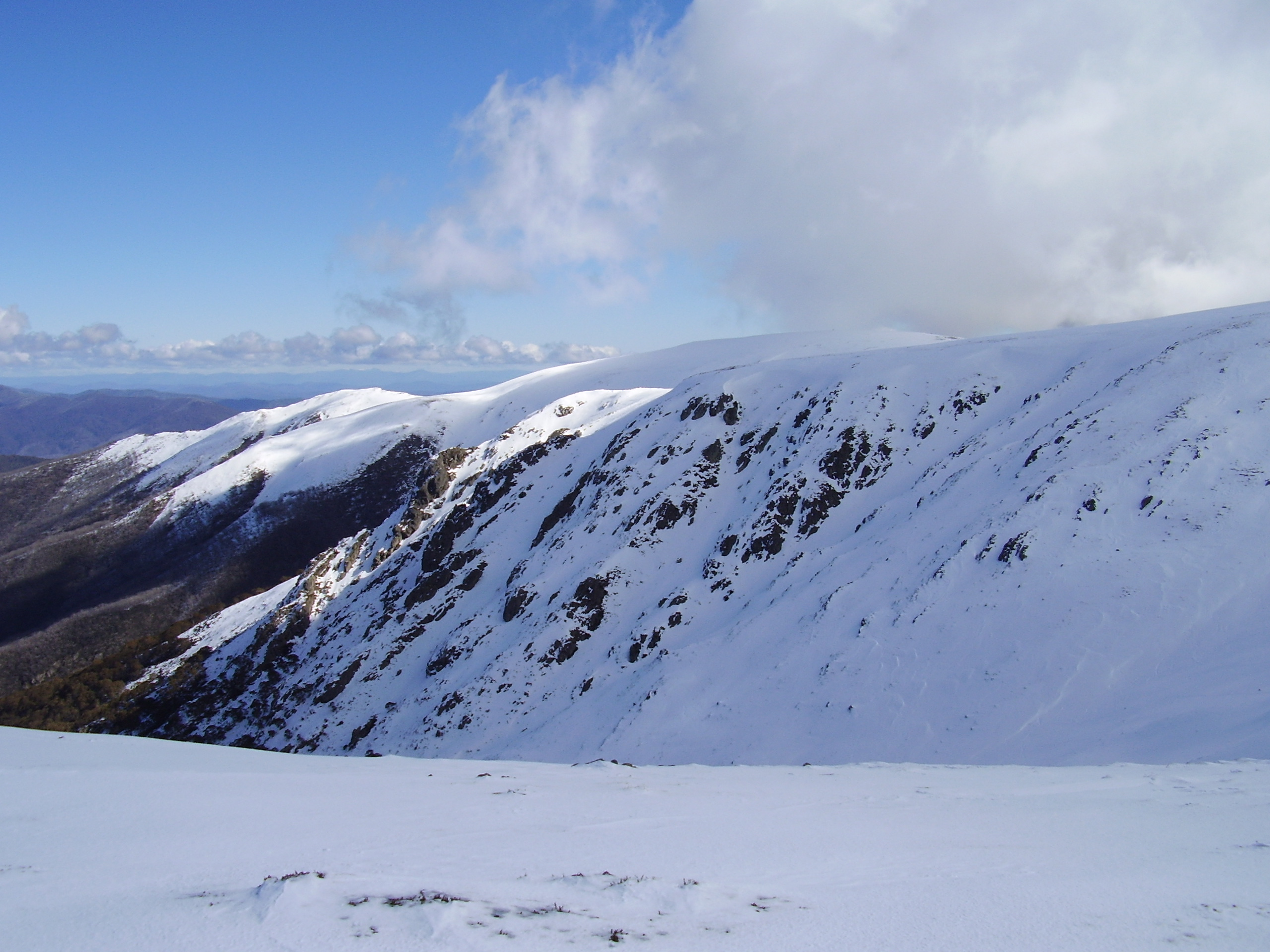
Mount Bogong

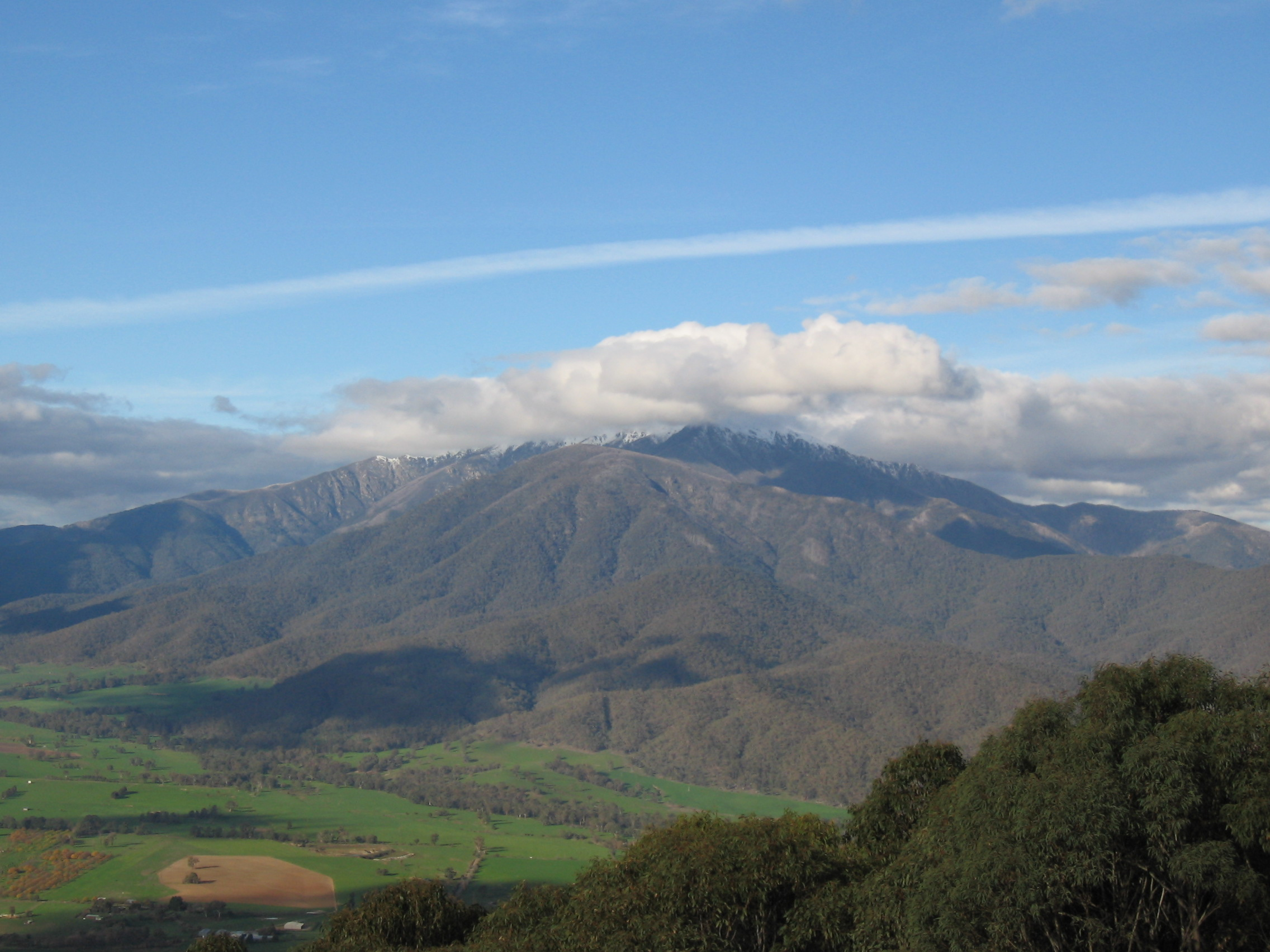
Mount Bogong

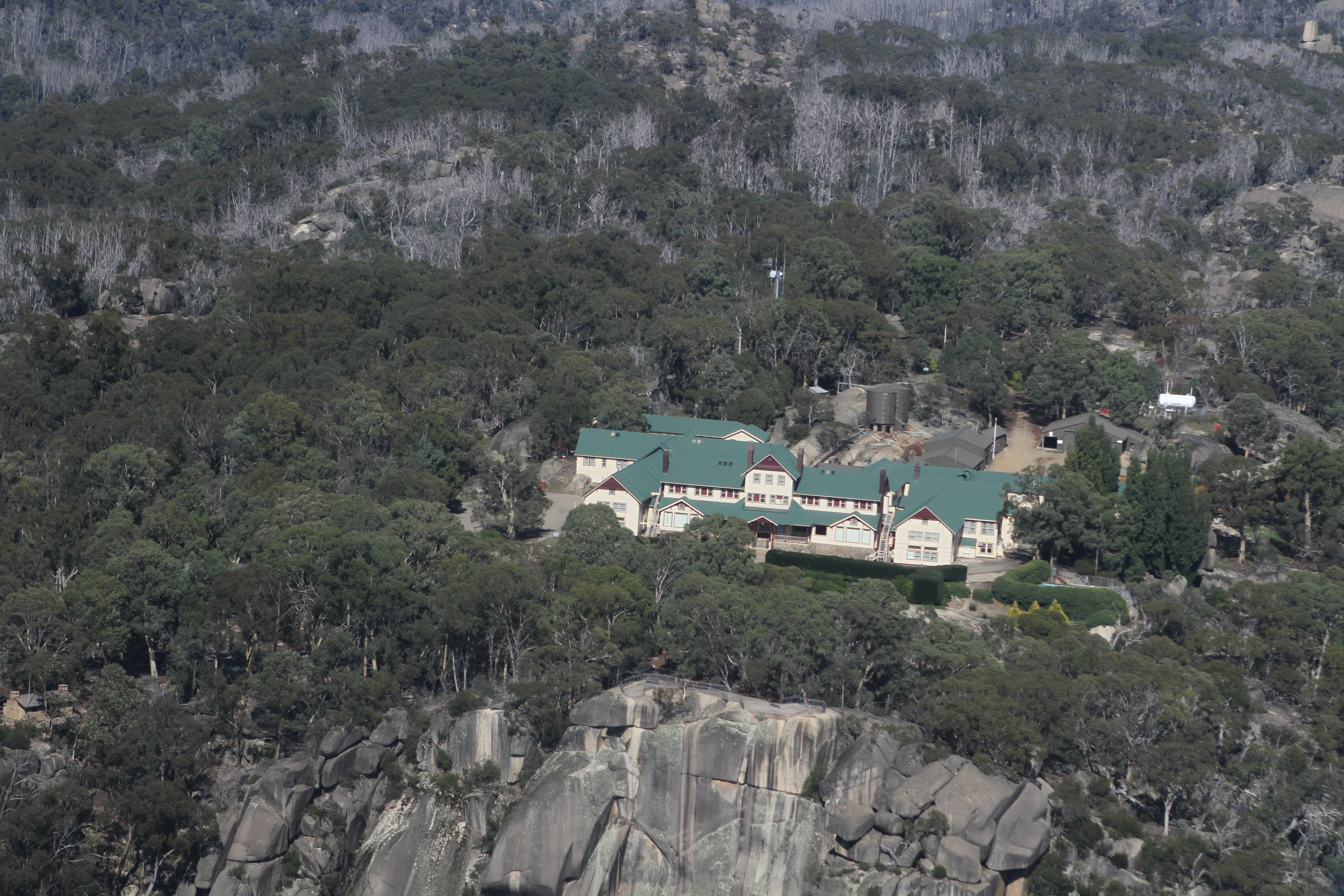
Mount Buffalo Chalet

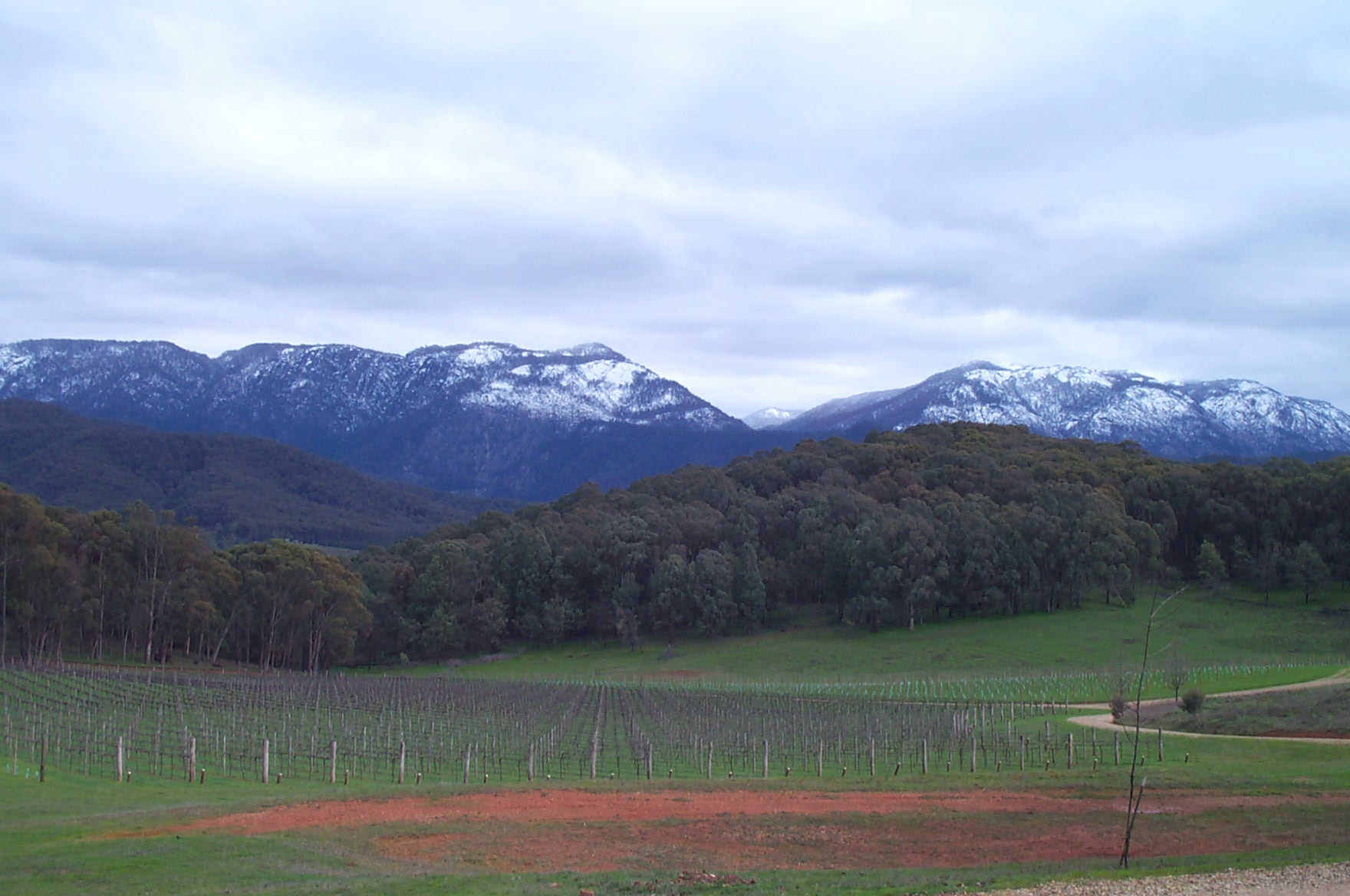
Mount Buffalo

== See also ==
- National Alpine Museum of Australia
- List of ski areas and resorts in Australia
- Skiing in Australia
- Skiing in New South Wales
- Skiing in Tasmania
- Skiing in the Australian Capital Territory
- Winter sport in Australia
