= Mount Mawson =

Mountain in Tasmania, Australia

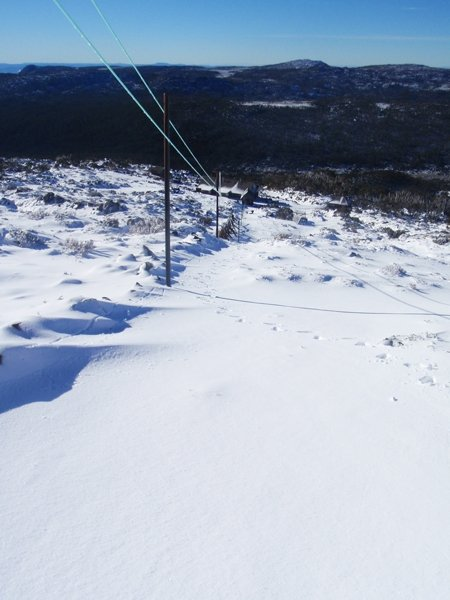
- Top of Mawson Run
- Interactive map of Mount Mawson
- Location: Mount Mawson, Mount Field
- Nearest city: Hobart
- Top elevation: 1,318 metres (4,324 ft)
- Base elevation: 1,250 metres (4,100 ft) AHD
- Trails: 5
- Lift system: 4 rope tows
- Website: mtmawson.info
- Location within Tasmania

Highest point
- Elevation: 1,318 m (4,324 ft)AHD
- Prominence: 51 m (167 ft)
- Listing: List of highest mountains of Tasmania
- Coordinates: 42°21′43″S 146°34′28″E

Geography
- Location: Southern Tasmania, Australia

Geology
- Rock age: Jurassic
- Mountain type: Dolerite

Mount Mawson is a mountain and club skifield situated within the Mount Field National Park in southern Tasmania, Australia.

The mountain has an elevation of 1,318 metres (4,324 ft) above sea level, slightly lower than the 1,460 metres (4,790 ft) at Ben Lomond ski-field in northern Tasmania. The summit of Mount Mawson is an isolated peak at the southeastern end of the Rodway Range, and is separated from the other higher peaks of the range to the northwest by the Mawson Plateau, which lies above 1,260 metres (4,130 ft).

By road, the mountain is located 89 kilometres (55 mi) north west of Hobart and 232 kilometres (144 mi) from Launceston.

== Skiing ==
Much of Tasmania is subject to at least occasional winter snows.

The Mount Mawson ski area was established as a club skifield in 1958 and is run by the Southern Tasmanian Ski Association. It is situated at around 1,250 metres (4,100 ft) above sea level with four ski tows about a 20-minute walk from the car park. Mawson has three lifts: two intermediate rope tows and a third steep incline rope tow accessing steep terrain. A small amount of club accommodation is available and there are some self-catering huts in the national park.

== See also ==
- List of highest mountains of Tasmania
- Skiing in Tasmania
