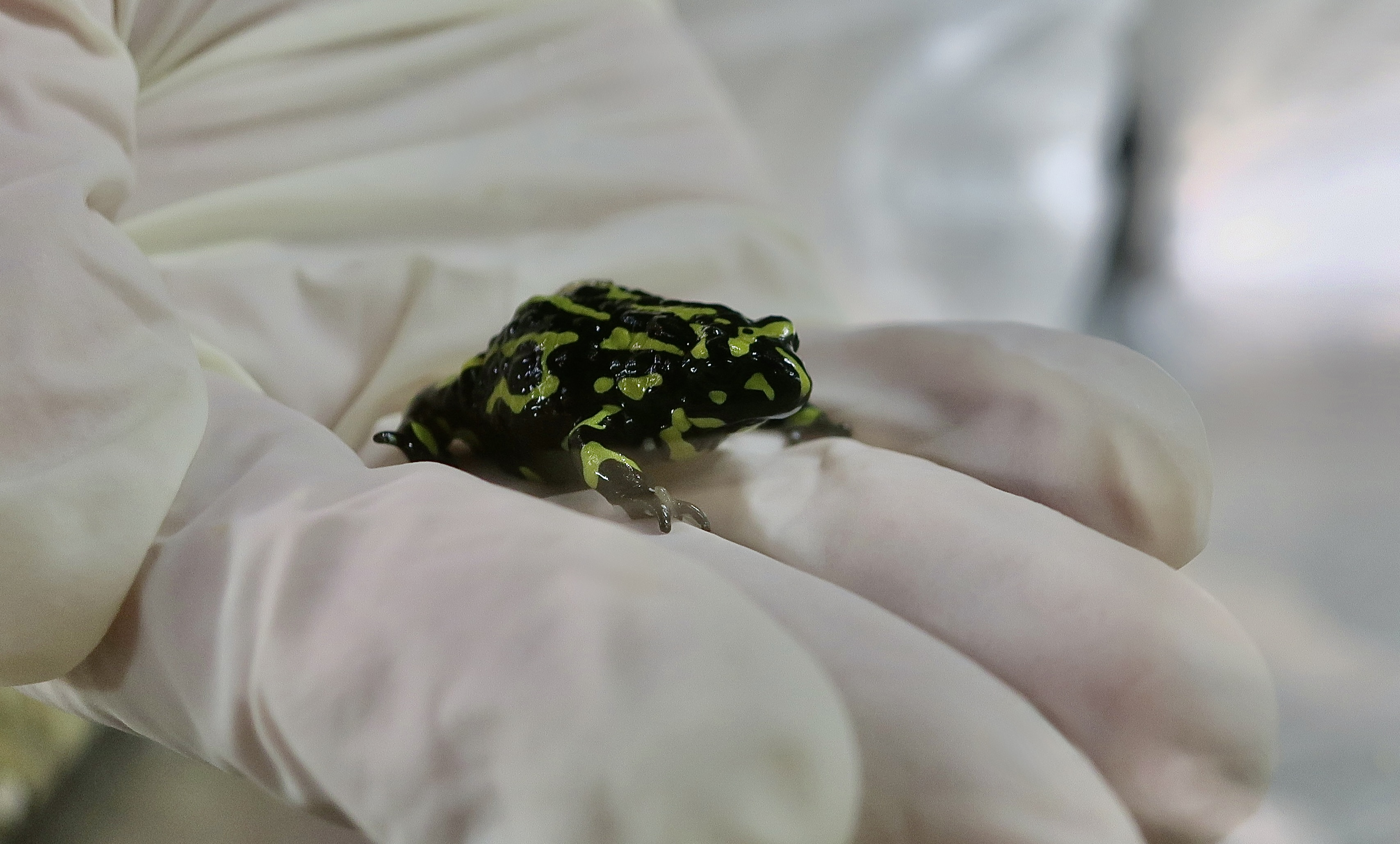
- At Taronga Zoo.

Conservation status
- Critically Endangered (IUCN 3.1)

Scientific classification
- Kingdom: Animalia
- Phylum: Chordata
- Class: Amphibia
- Order: Anura
- Family: Myobatrachidae
- Genus: Pseudophryne
- Species: P. pengilleyi

Binomial name
- Pseudophryne pengilleyi Wells & Wellington, 1985

= Northern corroboree frog =

Species of amphibian

The northern corroboree frog (Pseudophryne pengilleyi) is a species of Australian ground frog, native to southeastern Australia. It is differentiated by the southern corroboree frog by having slightly narrower and greener stripes, while also being smaller. Northern corroboree frogs live in waterlogged grasslands and adjacent woodlands. Northern corrboree frogs spend most of their time in the woodlands, going to the waterlogged grasslands in the summer to breed. Females lay around 25 eggs in damp vegetation, and hatch when water levels rise. The northern corrboree frog is listed as critically endangered and has decreased massively, due to chytrid, weeds, droughts, climate change, and livestock.

Northern corroboree frogs live 750–1,800 m (2,460–5,910 ft) above sea level, in three distinct regions, with the frogs displaying three distinct genetic characteristics. These populations live in the following areas: spanning the Fiery Range and Bogong Peaks in Kosciuszko National Park, the Bondo, Micalong and Wee Jasper State Forests in NSW; along the Brindabella Ranges in Namadgi National Park in the ACT; and Bimberi Nature Reserve and Brindabella National Park in NSW.

The northern corroboree frog has not suffered as badly as the southern. It is more widely distributed across about 550 km^{2} (210 sq mi) of the Brindabella and Fiery Ranges in Namadgi National Park in the ACT, and Kosciuszko National Park and Buccleuch State Forest in NSW. In 2004 it was downgraded from an IUCN assessment of critically endangered to endangered, though in 2022 this decision was reverted.
