= Mount Franklin (Australian Capital Territory) =

Mountain in the Brindabella Range, Australia

- Location within Australian Capital Territory

Highest point
- Elevation: 1,646 m (5,400 ft)
- Coordinates: 35°29′7″S 148°46′34″E

Geography
- Location: Australian Capital Territory/New South Wales, Australia
- Parent range: Brindabella Ranges, Great Dividing Range

Climbing
- Easiest route: Hike

Mount Franklin is a mountain with an elevation of 1,646 metres (5,400 ft) AHD in the Brindabella Ranges that is located on the border between the Australian Capital Territory and New South Wales, Australia. The summit of the mountain is located in the Australian Capital Territory.

The mountain is located in the Bimberi Nature Reserve and the Namadgi National Park. A marked walking trail to the summit can be reached via Mount Franklin Road. The summit is accessible by bush walking trails and requires no specialised climbing skills. It is located close to Brindabella Station where the Australian author Miles Franklin once lived and the mountain is named after her family. The mountain is often covered in snow in winter and Australian ski pioneers based themselves at Mount Franklin from the 1930s. Nowadays, cross country skiing is possible in the area during winter, when conditions allow.

== Skiing on Mount Franklin ==
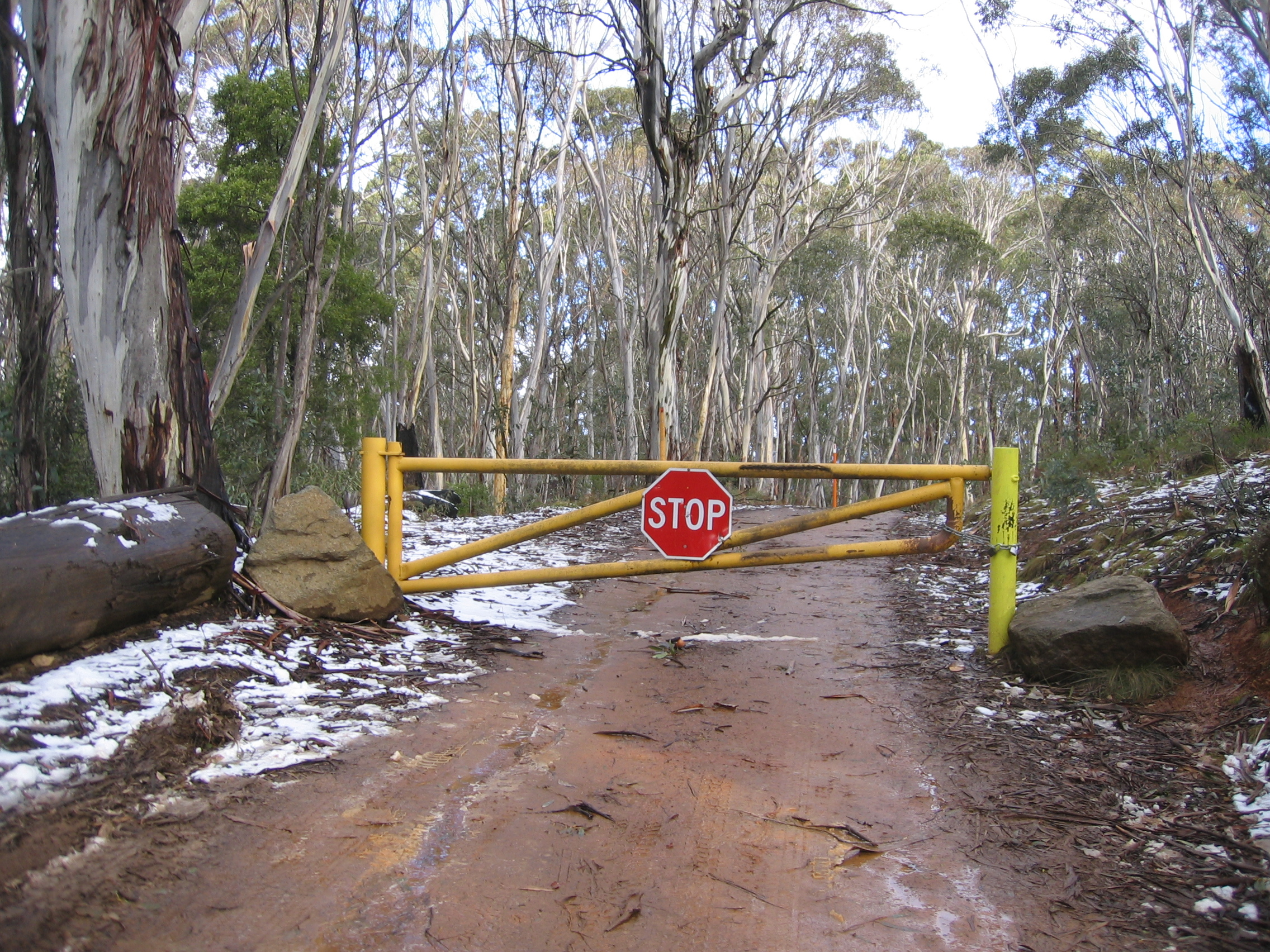
The road to Mount Franklin was built by the Canberra Alpine Club in the 1930s

A ski chalet was constructed at Mount Franklin in 1938 to service the Canberra Alpine Club. Ski runs were cleared and ski tows were improvised. The chalet later operated as a museum before being destroyed in the 2003 Canberra bushfires. A new shelter designed and built by University of Adelaide students opened in 2008. It serves as an interpretive centre and can provide park managers and emergency services personnel with a base to conduct search and rescue operations in the event of future bushfires. The ACT/NSW boundary passes through the Franklin Chalet ruin area.

Nowadays, cross country skiing is possible at Mount Franklin and surrounding peaks in winter, if conditions allow.

== See also ==
- List of mountains of Australia
- Mount Ginini
- Mount Gingera
