= Bimberi Nature Reserve =

Nature reserve of New South Wales, Australia

- IUCN category II (national park)
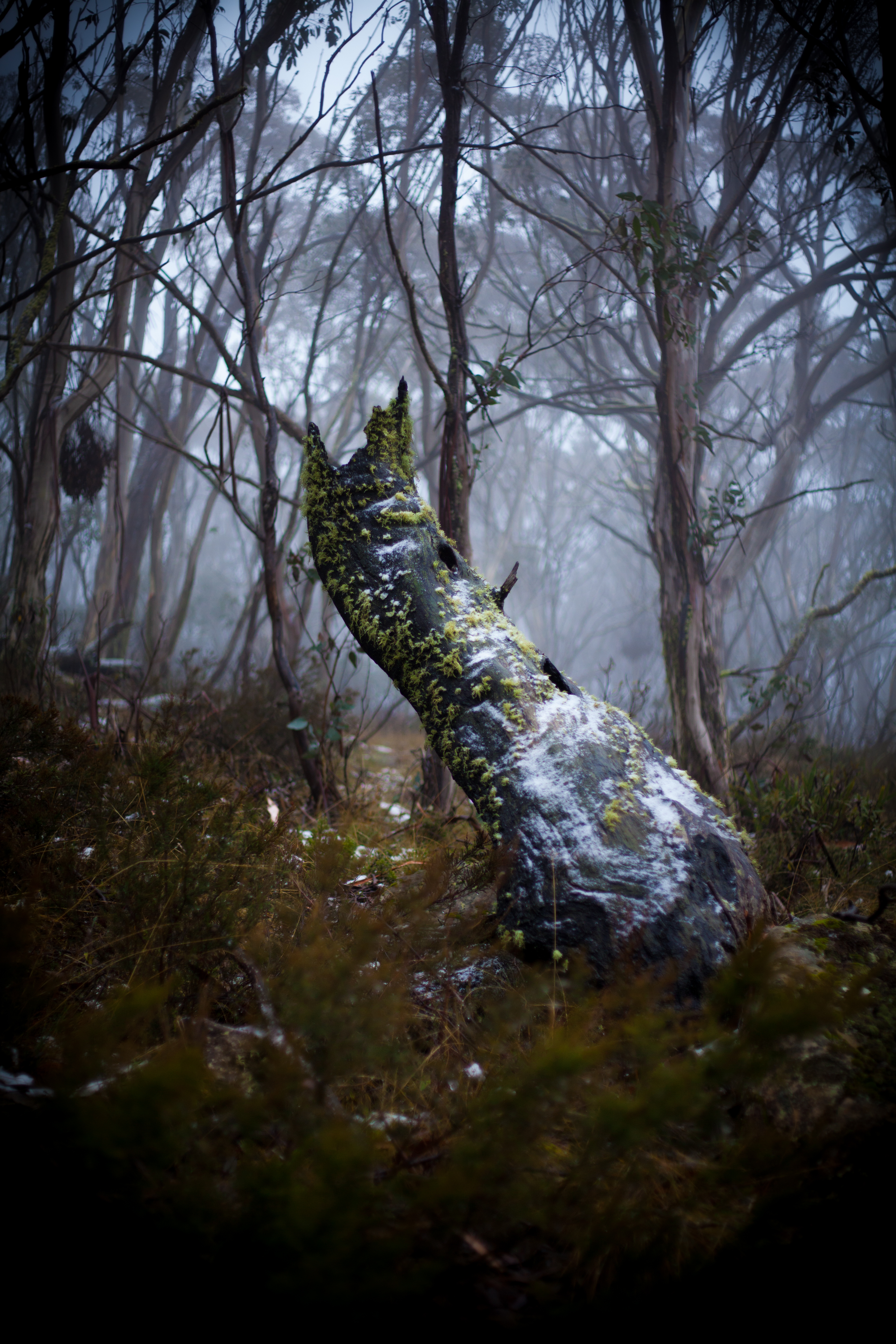
- Winter in the Bimberi Nature Reserve

- Location within New South Wales
- Location: New South Wales
- Coordinates: 35°34′54″S 148°45′4″E
- Area: 108.68 km^{2} (41.96 sq mi)
- Established: April 1985
- Governing body: NSW National Parks & Wildlife Service
- Website: http://www.environment.nsw.gov.au/NationalParks/parkHome.aspx?id=N0563

The Bimberi Nature Reserve is a protected nature reserve located in the Brindabella Range of New South Wales, in eastern Australia. The 10,868-hectare (26,860-acre) reserve is situated approximately 30 km (19 miles) south west of Canberra, which is in the Australian Capital Territory.

== Features ==
Bimberi Nature Reserve lies between Kosciuszko National Park in New South Wales and Namadgi National Park in the Australian Capital Territory. It also adjoins Brindabella National Park in New South Wales. Bimberi Nature Reserve is managed by the NSW National Parks & Wildlife Service.

The boundary between New South Wales and the Australian Capital Territory, and the boundary between Bimberi Nature Reserve and Namadgi National Park, both pass through the summit of Bimberi Peak, which is the highest point in Bimberi Nature Reserve, as well as the highest point in the Australian Capital Territory.

On 7 November 2008, the Bimberi Nature Reserve was added to the Australian National Heritage List as one of eleven areas constituting the Australian Alps National Parks and Reserves.

== See also ==
- Protected areas of New South Wales
