= ACTEW =

ACTEW may refer to:

- ActewAGL, utility company in the Australian Capital Territory
- Icon Water, formerly Actew Corporation, water company in the Australian Capital Territory
