= Gibraltar Creek =

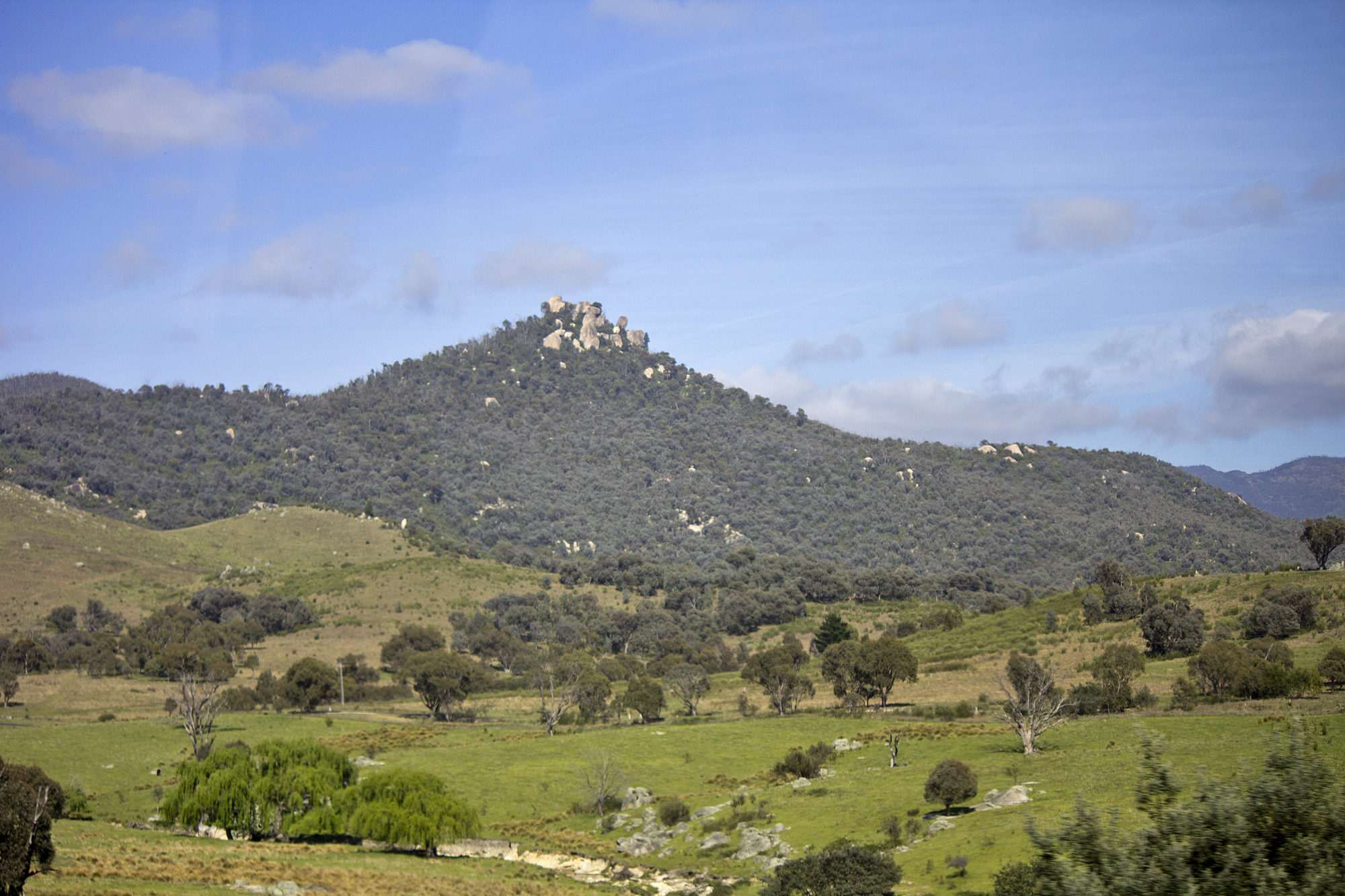
- Gibraltar Creek in the foreground, with Gibraltar Peak in the district of Paddys River.

Location
- Country: Australia
- Territory: Australian Capital Territory
- Region: South Eastern Highlands (IBRA), Capital Country

Physical characteristics
- Source: Brindabella Ranges
  - location: Billy Billy Rocks in Tidbinbilla Nature Reserve
  - coordinates: 35°29′8.97″S 148°56′2.63″E
  - elevation: 1,420 m (4,660 ft)
- Mouth: confluence with Paddys River
  - coordinates: 35°26′30.55″S 148°58′57.1″E
  - elevation: 647 m (2,123 ft)
- Length: 13 km (8.1 mi)

Basin features
- River system: Murrumbidgee River, Murray–Darling basin
- Falls: Gibraltar Falls

Gibraltar Creek, a perennial stream that is part of the Murrumbidgee catchment within the Murray-Darling basin, is located in the Australian Capital Territory, Australia.

There are several types of Greenhoods found along the creek's banks. Historical Aboriginal camp-sites have been also found on the creek banks.

== Location and features ==
Gibraltar Creek rises on the eastern slopes of the Brindabella Ranges in the south-west of the Australian Capital Territory (ACT), below Billy Billy Rocks in Tidbinbilla Nature Reserve, within Namadgi National Park. The creek flows generally north-east before reaching its confluence with Paddys River, south-west of Tuggeranong Town Centre. The creek descends 774 metres (2,539 ft) over its 13 kilometres (8.1 mi) course.

Gibraltar Falls are found on the Gibraltar Creek; and Gibraltar Creek Woods Reserve are located on the creek's edge.

== Wildlife and vegetation ==
Vegetation found on the banks of the creek include threatened flora such as the Scarlet Greenhoods, Fisch's Greenhood, Faint Greenhoods, Nodding Greenhoods and Maroonhoods. E. callianassa, Banksia and B. marginata have been found in the creek.

In 1930, the Cotter River was stocked with New Zealand trout, which were expected to migrate up the tributaries including the creek.

== History ==
Historical Aboriginal camp-sites have been found on the creek banks. In 1863, land abutting the creek was sold at auction. During late 1933 and early 1934, the river flooded several times and made it difficult to cross the creek. A motion was made to Australia's Minister for the Interior to cement over the creek bed to make crossing during the flood more feasible. By 1934, ramps had been added to assist in crossing the creek, replacing gates that had been placed there for cattle crossings.

Bushwalkers organised walks alongside the creek in the 1950s. In 1954, hikers got lost in the area and a search for them took place near the creek. In 1957, a teenager was shot while hiking near the creek.
