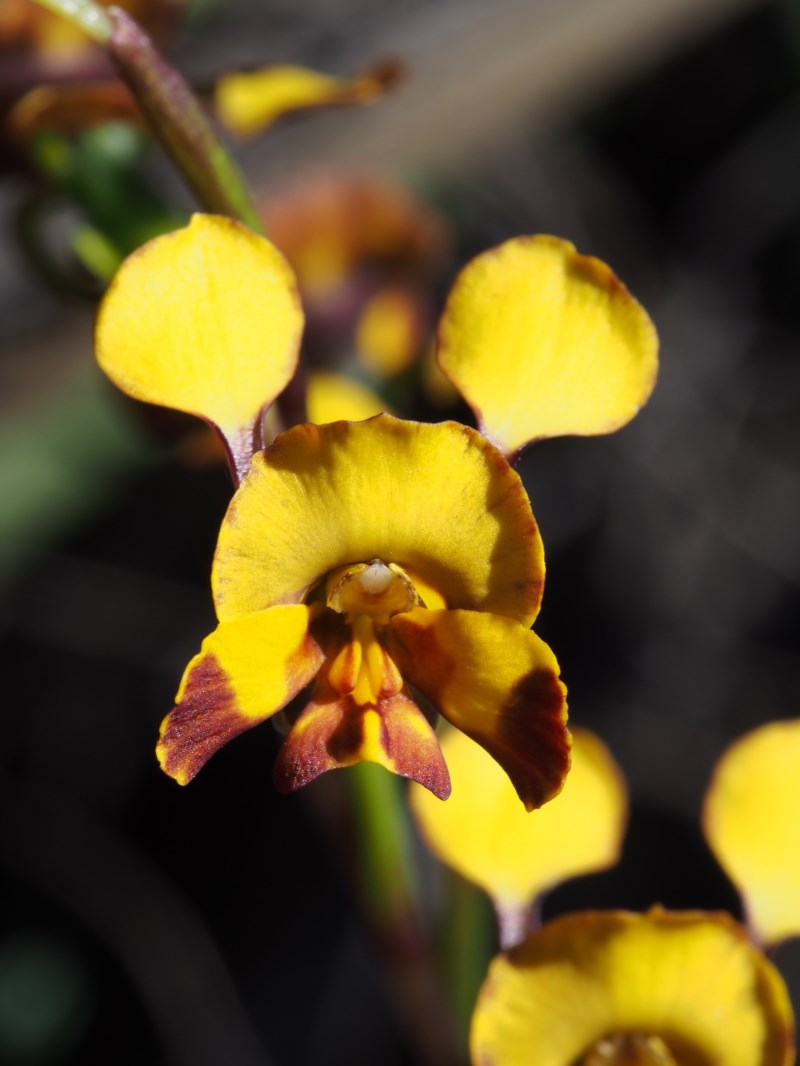
- Near Paddys River

Scientific classification
- Kingdom: Plantae
- Clade: Tracheophytes
- Clade: Angiosperms
- Clade: Monocots
- Order: Asparagales
- Family: Orchidaceae
- Subfamily: Orchidoideae
- Tribe: Diurideae
- Genus: Diuris
- Species: D. semilunulata

Binomial name
- Diuris semilunulata Messmer

= Diuris semilunulata =

Late leopard orchid

Species of orchid

Diuris semilunulata, commonly known as late leopard orchid, is a species of orchid that is native to New South Wales and the Australian Capital Territory. It has two grass-like leaves and up to five orange-coloured flowers with brown and purple blotches.

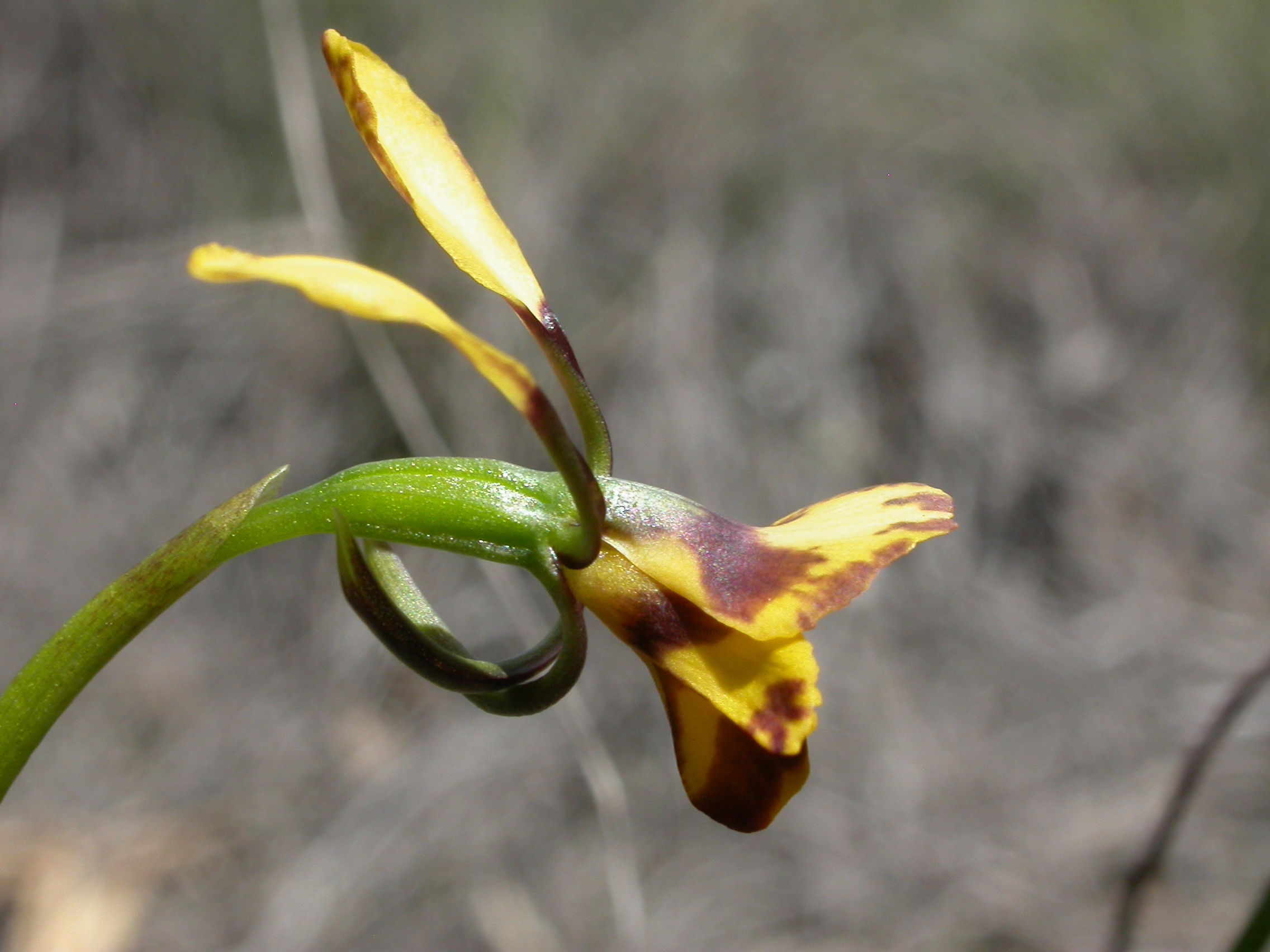
Side view of flower

== Description ==
Diuris semilunulata is a tuberous, perennial herb with two linear leaves, each 150–250 mm (6–10 in) long, 3–4 mm (0.1–0.2 in) wide and folded lengthwise. Between three and five orange-coloured flowers with large brown and purple blotches, 20–30 mm (0.8–1 in) wide are borne on a flowering stem 200–350 mm (8–10 in) tall. The dorsal sepal is erect, 8–10 mm (0.3–0.4 in) long, 6–8 mm (0.2–0.3 in) wide and egg-shaped. The lateral sepals are linear to lance-shaped with the narrower end towards the base, 12–18 mm (0.5–0.7 in) long, 2–4 mm (0.08–0.2 in) wide, turned downwards or backwards and crossed over each other. The petals are curved backwards, broadly egg-shaped to almost circular, 5–11 mm (0.2–0.4 in) long and 4–9 mm (0.2–0.4 in) wide on a dark reddish brown stalk 5–9 mm (0.2–0.4 in) long. The labellum is 4–8 mm (0.2–0.3 in) long and has three lobes. The centre lobe is wedge-shaped, 5–7 mm (0.2–0.3 in) wide with a central ridge. The side lobes are 5–8 mm (0.2–0.3 in) long, 4–7 mm (0.2–0.3 in) wide. There are two raised callus ridges 3–6 mm (0.1–0.2 in) long near the mid-line of the labellum. Flowering occurs from October to December.

== Taxonomy and naming ==
Diuris semilunulata was first formally described in 1944 by Pearl Messmer and the description was published in Herman Rupp's book The Orchids of New South Wales.

== Distribution ==
Late leopard orchid mostly grows in shallow, rocky soil in open forest in the Australian Capital Territory, New South Wales south from Nerriga and possibly Victoria.
