= Cotter Dam =

Dam in the Australian Capital Territory, Australia

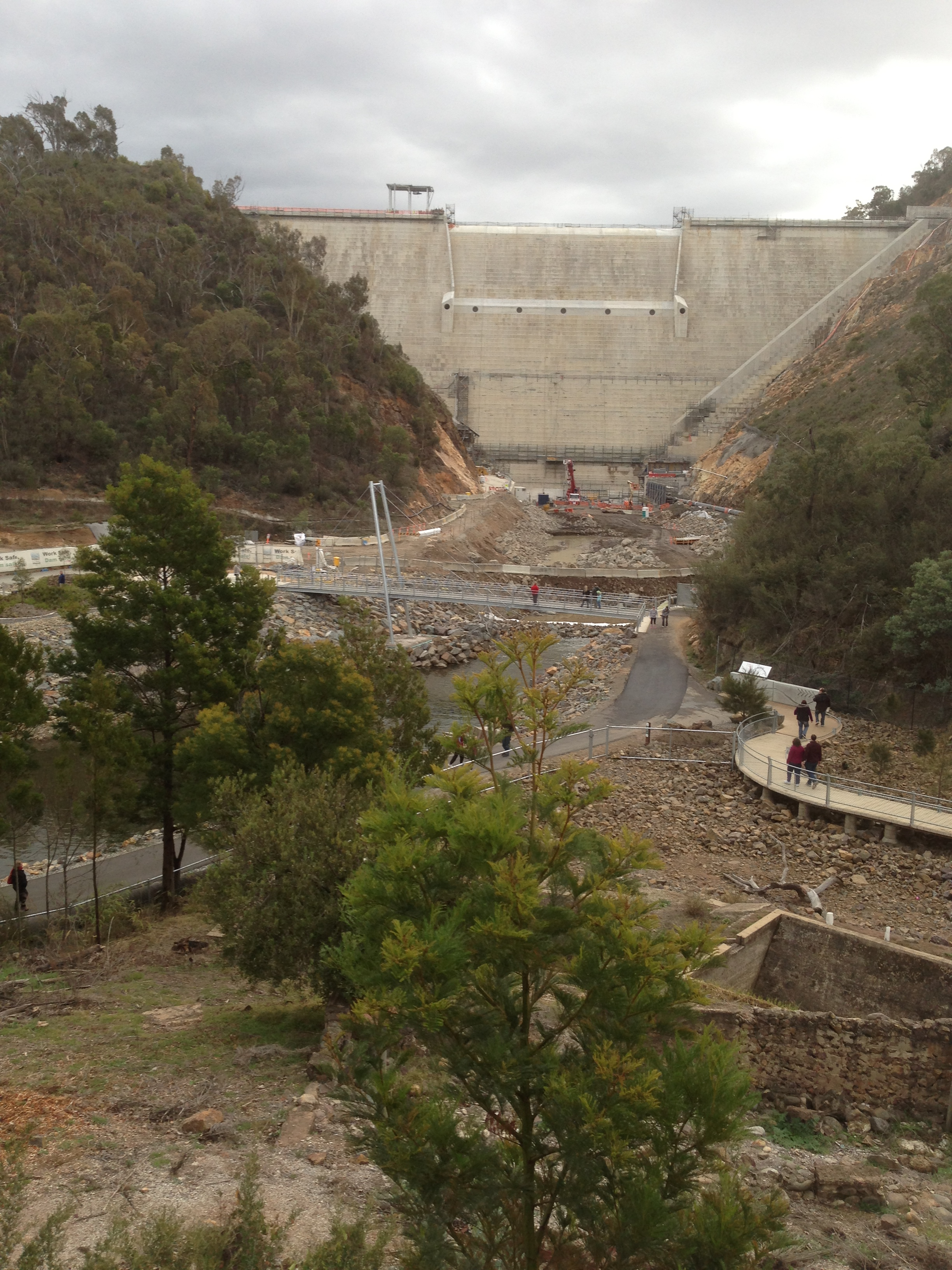
- Downriver from the new dam wall, in 2013

- Location of the 2013 gravity dam wall in the ACT
- Interactive map of Cotter Dam
- Location: Australian Capital Territory, Australia
- Coordinates: 35°19′13″S 148°56′23″E
- Purpose: Water supply
- Status: Operational
- Construction began: 1912 (Old Cotter); 2009 (New Cotter)
- Opening date: 1915 (Old Cotter); 2013 (New Cotter)
- Built by: Commonwealth Dept of Works (1915); Abigroup / John Holland joint venture (2013)
- Owner: Icon Water

Dam and spillways
- Type of dam: Gravity dam
- Impounds: Cotter River
- Height: 87 m (285 ft)
- Length: 330 m (1,080 ft)
- Elevation at crest: 550.8 m (1,807 ft) AHD
- Dam volume: 380×10^{3} m^{3} (13×10^{6} cu ft)
- Spillways: 1
- Spillway type: Uncontrolled
- Spillway capacity: 5,670 m^{3}/s (200,000 cu ft/s)

Reservoir
- Creates: Cotter Reservoir
- Total capacity: 78 GL (63,000 acre⋅ft)
- Active capacity: 76.2 GL (61,800 acre⋅ft)
- Catchment area: 482 km^{2} (186 sq mi)
- Surface area: 285 ha (700 acres)
- Normal elevation: 511 m (1,677 ft) AHD
- Website iconwater.com.au/cotterdam

The Cotter Dam is a concrete gravity and rockfill embankment dam across the Cotter River, located in the Australian Capital Territory, Australia. Both the dam and river are named after early settler in the area Garrett Cotter. The impounded Cotter Reservoir is a supply source of potable water for the city of Canberra and its environs.

The original dam, sometimes referred to as the Old Cotter Dam, was a gravity dam, completed in 1915. Several minor expansions occurred over subsequent decades. In 2013, a major reconstruction was completed when two embankment saddle dams were added, the dam wall was raised and relocated, and the original dam wall inundated within the expanded reservoir.

== Original dam, completed in 1915 ==
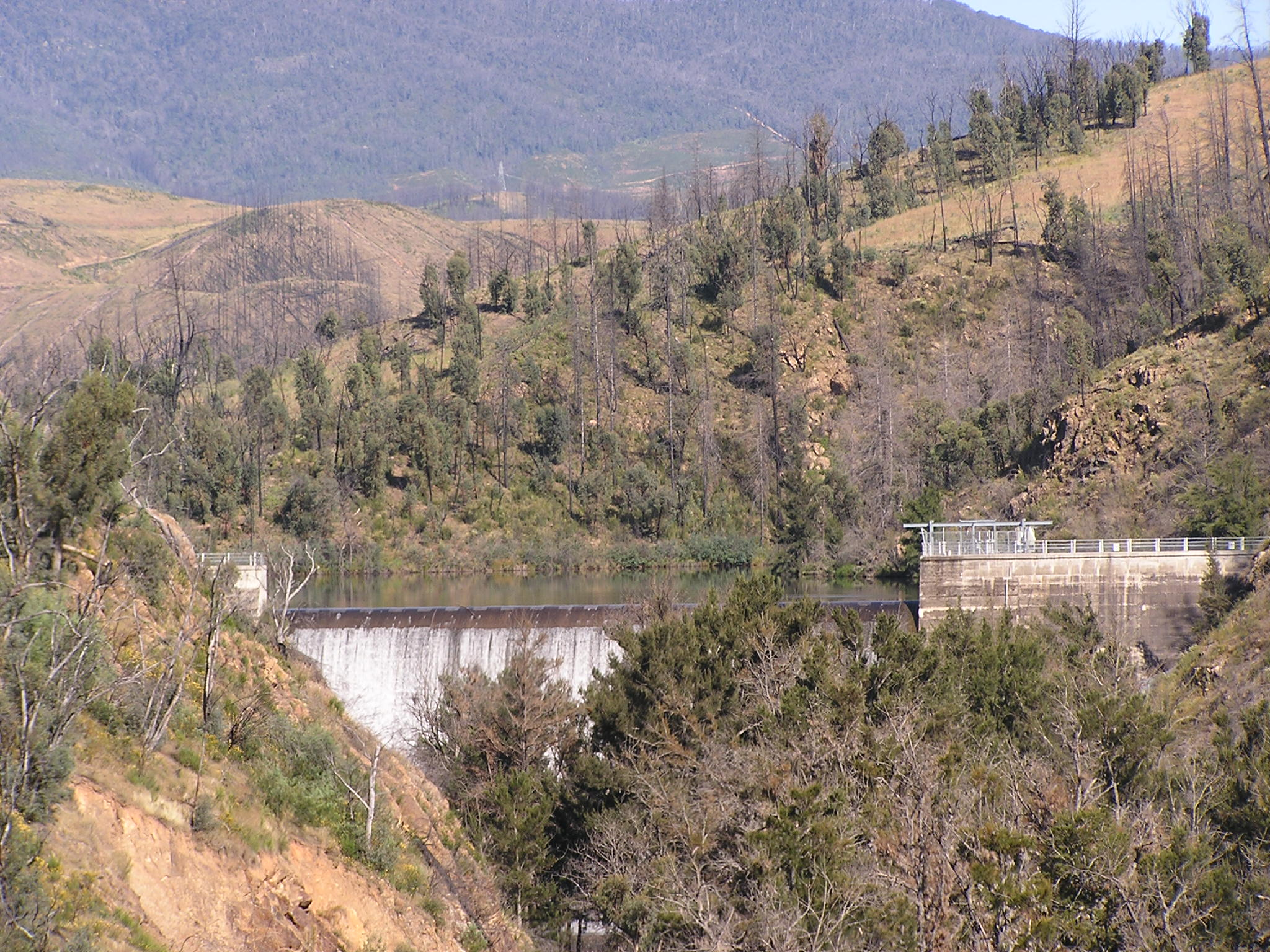
The Old Cotter Dam in 2005, with the surrounding country showing the effects of the 2003 bushfires.

The original concrete gravity Cotter Dam was designed by Harry Gustav Connell, the supervising engineer in the Department of Home Affairs from 1912 to 1916. The construction started in 1912 and completed in 1915 when the city of Canberra was established.

The height of the dam wall was raised from 26 metres (85 ft) to 31 metres (102 ft) high in 1951 in order to increase capacity of the reservoir. The dam wall was 118 metres (387 ft) long and created a reservoir with a surface area of 50 hectares (120 acres). The uncontrolled spillway was capable of discharging 850 cubic metres per second (30,000 cu ft/s). At that time, the top water level of the dam was 501 metres (1,644 ft) above sea level and the reservoir had a capacity of 3,856 megalitres (3,126 acre⋅ft). The dam wall of the Old Cotter Dam, still extant, although inundated in the reservoir, is located at 35°19′10″S 148°56′19″E.

A subsequent review in October 2006, using more accurate mapping methods, resulted in capacity being re-estimated downwards from the previous estimate of 4,700 megalitres (3,800 acre⋅ft). Additional galleries and drains were constructed between 1984 and 1986. In order to supply the city with potable water, water from the reservoir was pumped to Mount Stromlo, and from there the water flowed by gravity to fill the city's reservoirs.

From the 1960s onwards, better quality water could be supplied without pumping using the newly completed Bendora and Corin dams, and Cotter Dam was only used when water was in short supply. However, in December 2004, ACTEW Corporation brought the dam back on line in response to the ongoing drought.

== Enlarged dam, completed in 2013 ==
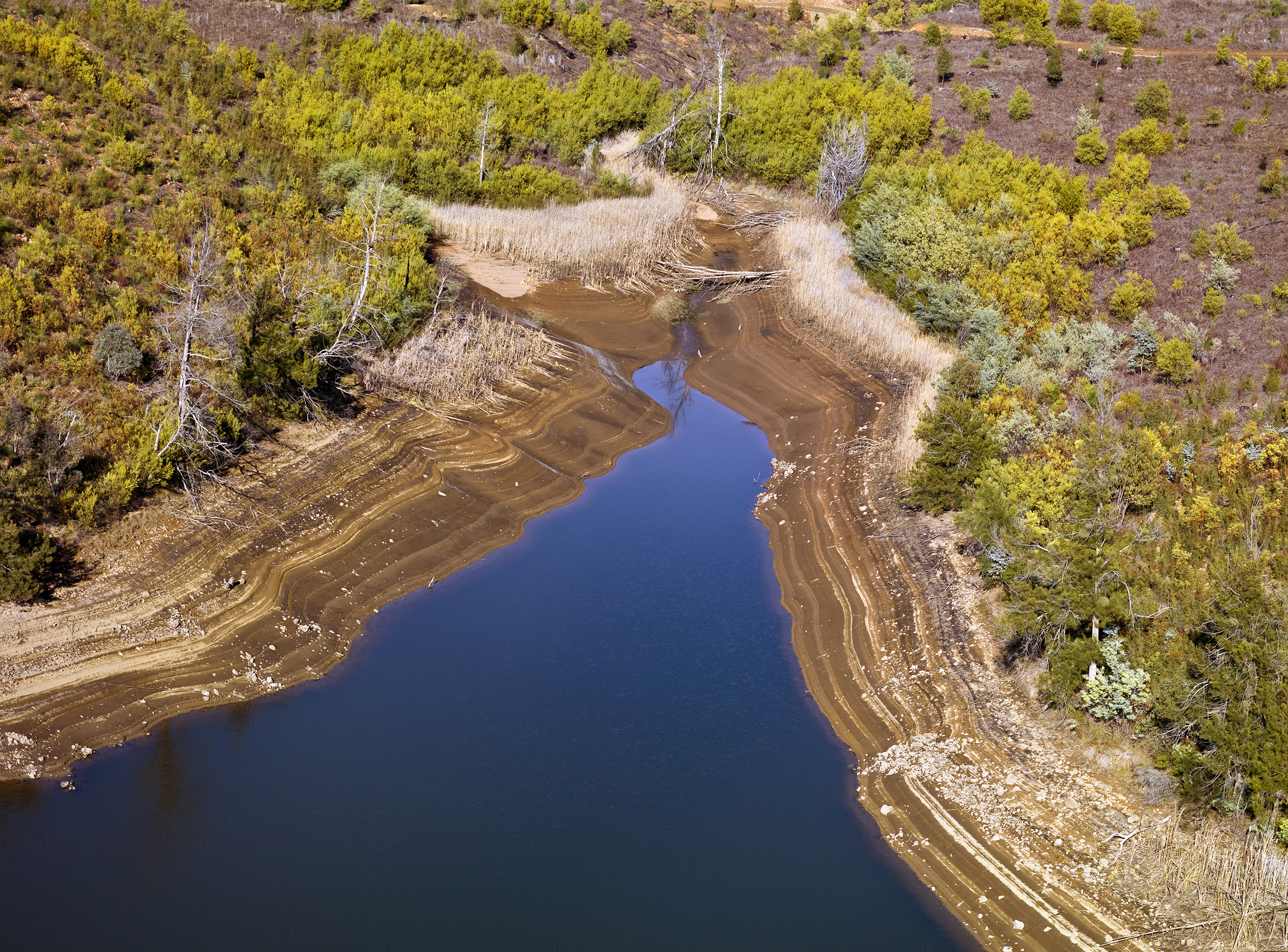
Aerial view, 2011

Commenced in November 2009 and completed in October 2013, the enlarged Cotter Dam comprised a new 87-metre-high (285 ft) roller compacted concrete dam wall built 100 metres (330 ft) downstream from the old dam wall, located at 35°19′13″S 148°56′23″E, along with two auxiliary embankment saddle dam walls along low-lying adjoining valleys, located at 35°19′23″S 148°56′14″E and 35°19′28″S 148°55′59″E.

Constructed on rock foundations by an Abigroup / John Holland joint venture, with engineering design by GHD, the main dam wall is 330 metres (1,080 ft) long, with the two rockfill embankments 340 metres (1,120 ft) and 300 metres (980 ft) long and 15 metres (49 ft) and 18 metres (59 ft) high respectively, both with internal earthen cores. The enlarged dam walls increased the storage capacity of the Cotter Reservoir 20-fold, from the previous 3.9 gigalitres (3,200 acre⋅ft) to 78 gigalitres (63,000 acre⋅ft).

The old dam wall remains, inundated by the water held behind the new dam wall and acting as a sediment trap for the new dam's intake tower. The old dam may only be visible in exceptional circumstances of drought. Completion was originally scheduled for the end of June 2011, however construction was delayed until August 2013 due to heavy rainfalls in the summer of 2010/2011, the discovery of an unexpectedly large rock seam at the site of the foundations in 2011, and severe flooding in March 2012. The uncontrolled spillway is capable of discharging 5,670 cubic metres per second (200,000 cu ft/s) with a high water level approximately 550.8 metres (1,807 ft) AHD.

== Engineering heritage ==
The dam precinct received a Historic Engineering Marker from Engineers Australia as part of its Engineering Heritage Recognition Program.

== Recreation ==
Located approximately 23 kilometres (14 mi) from the Canberra city centre, the area surrounding the dam wall is popular for picnics, swimming, fishing, bushwalking, and other recreational interests. Limited camping facilities are available. There is a viewing platform of the dam wall.

== See also ==
- List of dams and reservoirs in the Australian Capital Territory
