= Queanbeyan River =

Queanbeyan Burra Creek, Sallee Creek
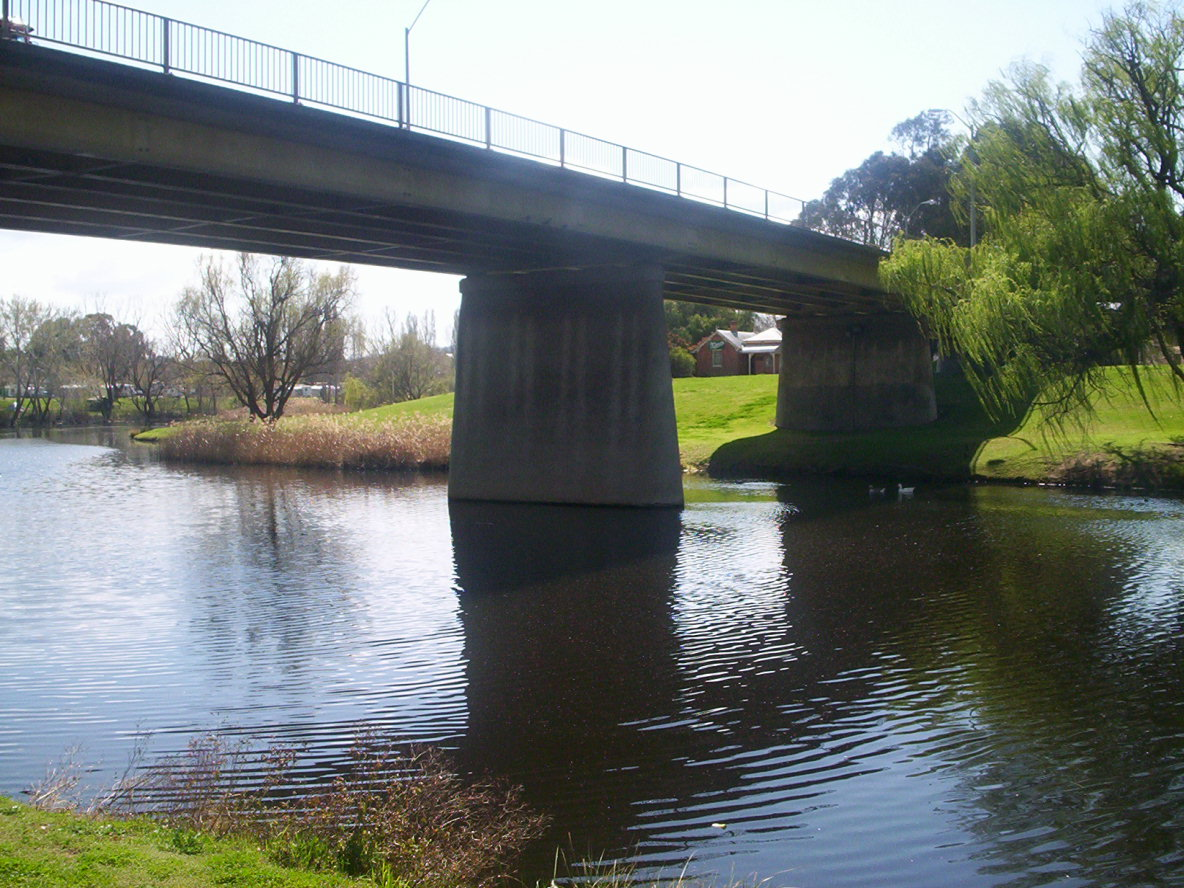
- Road bridge carrying the Kings Highway over the Queanbeyan River, in Queanbeyan

- Location of the Queanbeyan River mouth in the ACT
- Etymology: Aboriginal (Ngarigu): "clearwater"

Location
- Country: Australia
- State/terr.: New South Wales; Australian Capital Territory
- Regions: South Eastern Highlands (IBRA); Monaro; Capital Country
- Local government areas: Cooma-Monaro; Queanbeyan
- City: Queanbeyan

Physical characteristics
- Source: Gourock Range
  - location: east of Bredbo, New South Wales
  - coordinates: 35°56′24″S 149°27′35″E
  - elevation: 1,260 m (4,130 ft)
- Mouth: confluence with the Molonglo River
  - location: Oaks Estate, Australian Capital Territory
  - coordinates: 35°20′13″S 149°13′51″E
  - elevation: 567 m (1,860 ft)
- Length: 104 km (65 mi)
- Basin size: 96,000 km^{2} (37,000 sq mi)

Basin features
- River system: Murrumbidgee catchment, Murray-Darling basin
- Reservoirs: Googong Reservoir, Queanbeyan Weir

The Queanbeyan River, a perennial stream that is part of the Molonglo catchment within the Murray–Darling basin, is located in the Monaro and Capital Country regions of New South Wales and the Australian Capital Territory, in Australia. The river is 104 kilometres (65 mi) in length with a catchment area of 96,000 hectares (240,000 acres). The Queanbeyan River and the Cotter River meet the potable water supply needs of the Canberra and Queanbeyan region and whose water quality is specifically protected under Federal legislation.

It is believed that the local Aboriginal Ngarigo people used a word that sounded like queanbeyan to describe the river, said to mean "clearwater".

== River course ==
The headwaters of the Queanbeyan River rise 70 kilometres (43 mi) east-southeast of Queanbeyan and about 40 kilometres (25 mi) northeast of the township of Bredbo, near the village of Jerangle. Fourteen tributaries upstream of the Googong Dam contribute to the river flow including the Burra, Urialla, Tinderry, Ballinafad, Groggy, Woolpack, Sherlock, Lyons, Towneys and Mile Creeks. The major river crossings above Googong Dam are the Boolboolma causeway on the Tinderry Road and a road bridge on the Captain's Flat-Jerangle Road.

Once inside the city precinct of Queanbeyan, the river is crossed by several bridges, including the Canberra-Goulburn railway, Morisset Street bridge, the Queens Bridge on Monaro Street (which becomes Bungendore Road or Kings Highway), and by a pedestrian footbridge near Isabella Street in East Queanbeyan. Queens Bridge was opened by Wal Fife, Minister for Transport and Highways, on 21 July 1975, according to a plaque on the bridge. The Queanbeyan River meets the Molonglo River at a confluence located in Oaks Estate, within the boundary of the Australian Capital Territory. The river descends 697 metres (2,287 ft) over its 104-kilometre (65 mi) course. The river's catchment area is 920 square kilometres (360 sq mi), more than double that of the Cotter River.

=== Damming ===
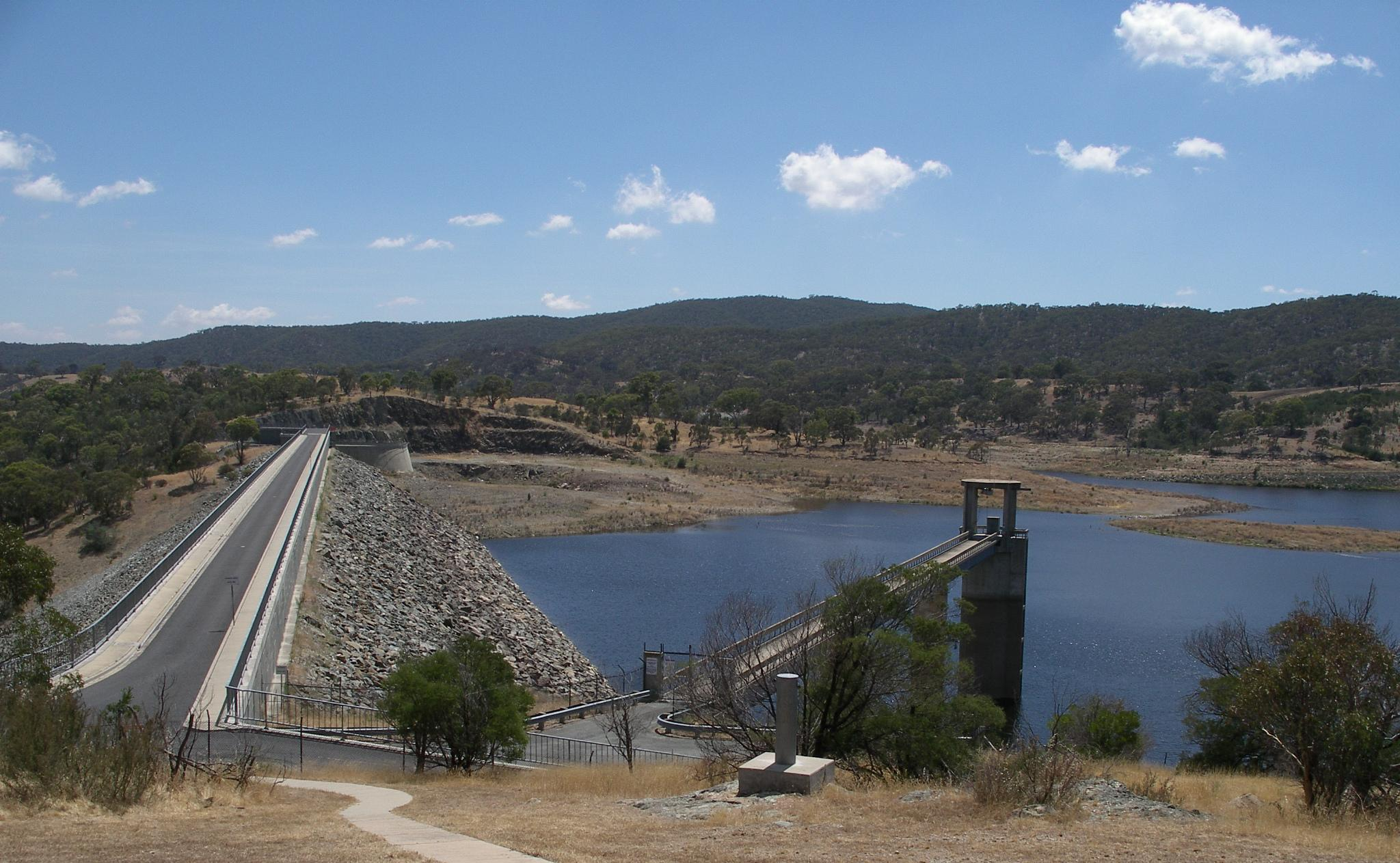
Googong Dam spillway and dam wall

The Queanbeyan Weir was constructed originally in 1901-02, providing a pool in the Queanbeyan River near the centre of the town for the town's water supply. It is now a place for town beautification with several parks located along the river, such as Blundell Park, Queen Elizabeth Park, and Ray Morton Park. The weir also provides for minor irrigation requirements. A buttressed concrete gravity wall which was 58 metres (190 ft) long, raised an extra 1 metre (3 ft 3 in) to the height of 4 metres (13 ft) in 1951–1952. The weir has had serious impacts on native fish migration in the Queanbeyan River.

==== Googong Dam ====
The Googong Dam is located 5 kilometres (3.1 mi) upstream of the town of Queanbeyan. The dam was completed in 1979 and has a maximum carrying capacity of 124,500 megalitres (4,400×10^{6} cu ft). The Commonwealth Government owns the dam, which is operated by ACTEW Corporation, the water utility provider, an ACT government-owned corporation. ACTEW also manages the dam foreshores. Lower flows in the river downstream of the dam since its construction, together with below average rainfall for the past decade, have modified the river channel and led to an increase in colonisation by willows and river plants which enjoy low flows. Management of the river includes eradication of these weeds.

== History ==
The Queanbeyan region is the traditional home of the Ngunnawal and the Ngarigo peoples. The first Europeans visitors to the area were led by Charles Throsby. While searching for the Murrumbidgee River in 1820, his party followed the course of the Queanbeyan River into a valley at the eastern end of the Limestone Plains near present-day Canberra.

The Queanbeyan River was the main water supply for the towns of Queanbeyan and during its early history it was an integral element to its economy. Wool scouring was carried out in the river near present-day Oaks Estate, formerly a part of Queanbeyan.

=== Flooding ===
The first significant flood after European settlement of the site of Queanbeyan City was in 1851; others followed twice in 1852, twice in 1861, twice in 1870, 1891, 1910, 1922, 1925, 1952, 1974, 1975 and 1976. A timeline compiled by a member of the Queanbeyan and District Historical Museum Society gives similar dates, extending to 2012. It is yet to be updated to record another 6-metre (19.7 feet) flood on 6 June 2016.

During the 1976 flood the half completed Googong Dam was at risk of collapse under the weight of water behind it. In this eventuality low-lying parts of Queanbeyan and Canberra would have been inundated. The Queanbeyan Cemetery was flooded, with scores of bodies washed downstream into Lake Burley Griffin.

In December 2010 the Queanbeyan River peaked at 8.4 metres (28 ft) and broke its banks, flooding the Queanbeyan Riverside tourist park. All schools in the area were closed and some local schools were used as shelter for evacuated residents of around 100 houses and businesses. Following extensive rains in the catchment, in March 2012 there were flooding alerts, however the river did not breach its banks.

== Fishing ==
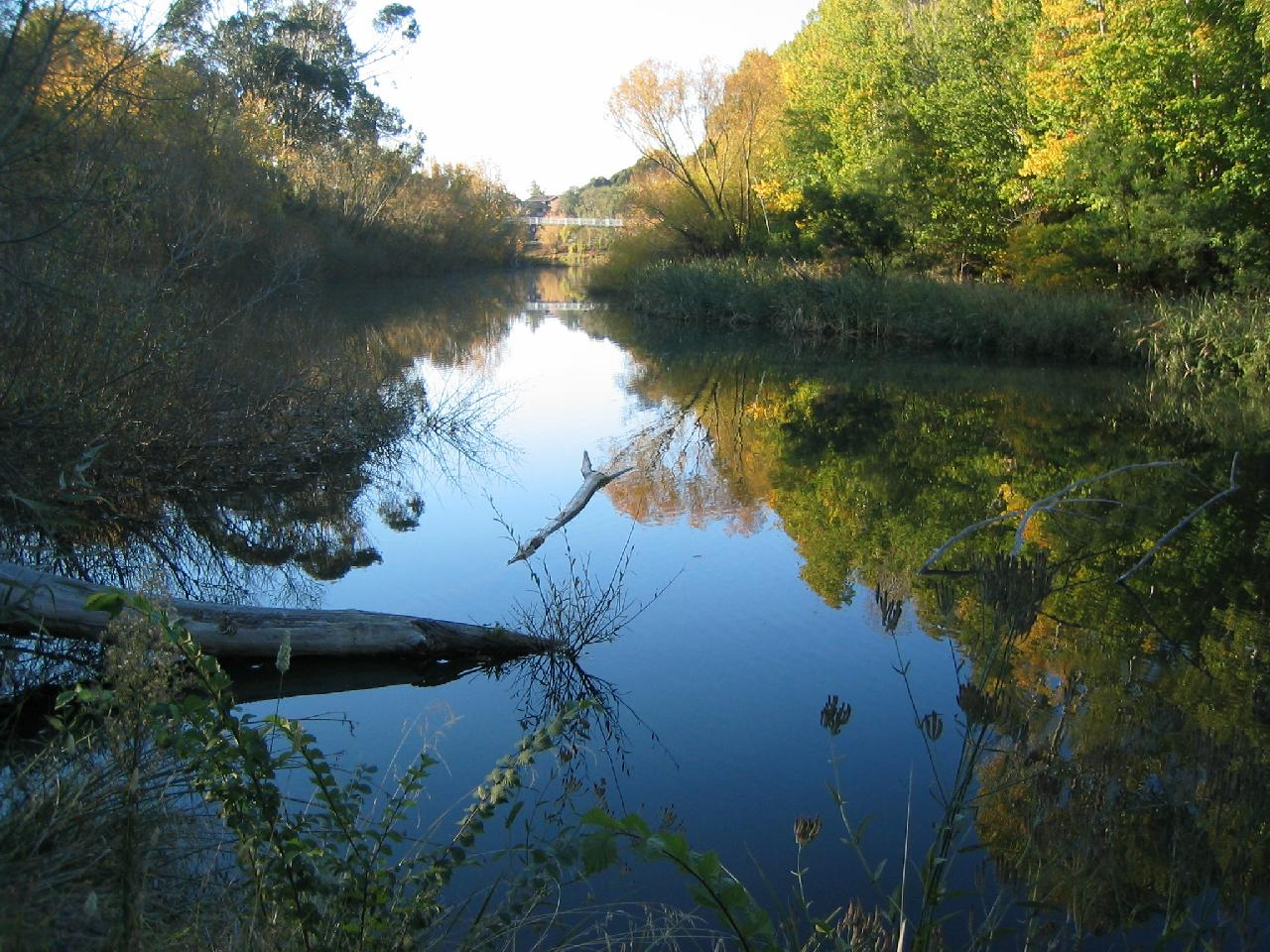
A quiet stretch of the Queanbeyan River near the suspension footbridge, Queanbeyan

The Queanbeyan River was renowned as a beautiful river abounding in native Murray cod, which once extended to the vicinity of Googong Dam, and native Macquarie perch, which extended to at least the headwaters of Googong Dam. Due to this abundance of native fish, the Queanbeyan River, along with the Molonglo River, was often known as the "Fish River" in the early days of settlement. Sometimes the Queanbeyan River was further distinguished by being called the "South Fish River". On more than one occasion in the late 19th and early 20th centuries floods deposited live Murray cod in the main streets of Queanbeyan. A variety of ills including introduction of exotic fish such as trout, overfishing, willow encroachment, siltation, and weirs blocking migration saw native fish populations in the Queanbeyan River close to extinction by the time Googong Dam was built.

== Water quality ==
Under the Seat of Government Acceptance Act, 1909, the Government of New South Wales guaranteed the Australian Capital Territory access to resources including water by protecting and not polluting the waters of the Queanbeyan River.

The condition of the river as a native habitat below Googong Dam has been seen as unhealthy in recent years by the Queanbeyan City Council, with the river being overrun with carp and reeds. The Queanbeyan Council has put in place a resource development scheme to clean out the river, including a "catch a carp" competition where the winners won $500 or fishing gear.

European carp have not penetrated the river above Googong Dam, providing an excellent trout and native fish catchery in both the dam and the river upstream. Carp are present the entire length of the river, but in small quantities. Since construction of Googong Dam in 1979, the endangered Macquarie perch has been very occasionally reported in the reservoir, and rarely beyond the first waterfall upstream of Googong Dam, despite the introduction of 57 Macquarie perch in the 1980s.

== Other wildlife ==
The Queanbeyan River has a range of native wildlife ranging from wombats and kangaroos, which are often found grazing on the banks, to the not commonly seen platypus. The area surrounding the Queanbeyan River supports a large population of eastern grey kangaroos. There is also a small number of platypuses.

== See also ==
- List of rivers of Australia
- List of rivers of Australia § Australian Capital Territory
- List of rivers of New South Wales (L–Z)
- Rivers of New South Wales
