= Mount Stromlo Hydro-Power Station =

Hydro-electric power station in Canberra, Australia

Coordinates: 35°19′42.65″S 149°0′5.08″E

The Mount Stromlo Hydro-Power Station is a small hydro-electric power station installed on the Bendora Gravity Main in Canberra, Australia. It produces about 200 megawatt-hours (720 GJ) megawatt hours of electricity per month. Production of energy depends on the water flow into the nearby Mount Stromlo Water Treatment Plant.

It was constructed in 2000 and is operated by Icon Water, the water and sewerage utility of the Australian Capital Territory.
