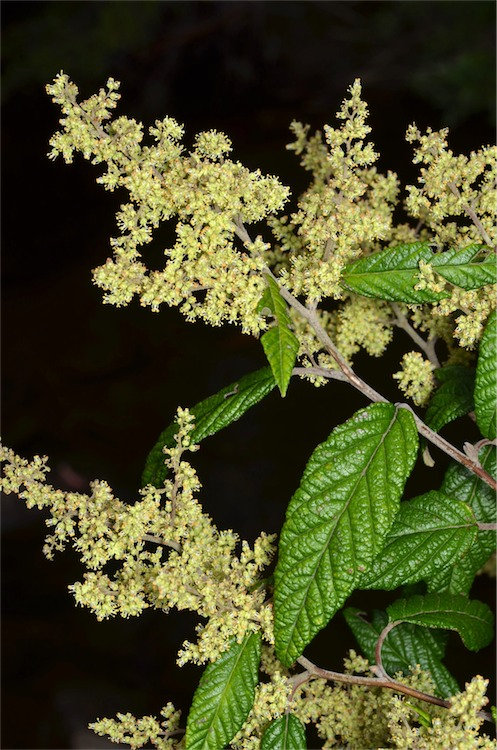
- Pomaderris aspera near Gibraltar Falls

Scientific classification
- Kingdom: Plantae
- Clade: Tracheophytes
- Clade: Angiosperms
- Clade: Eudicots
- Clade: Rosids
- Order: Rosales
- Family: Rhamnaceae
- Genus: Pomaderris
- Species: P. aspera

Binomial name
- Pomaderris aspera Sieber ex DC.

Synonyms
- Pomaderris mollis Colenso

= Pomaderris aspera =

Hazel pomaderris

Species of tree

Pomaderris aspera, commonly known as hazel pomaderris, is a species of flowering plant in the family Rhamnaceae and is endemic to south-eastern Australia. It is a shrub or small tree with elliptic to lance-shaped or egg-shaped leaves and greenish-yellow flowers.

== Description ==
Pomaderris aspera is a shrub or small tree that typically grows to a height of 2–20 m (6 ft 7 in – 65 ft 7 in), and has dark brown, fairly smooth bark with some fissures and longitudinal irregularities. The branchlets are covered with rust-coloured, star-shaped hairs when young. The leaves are elliptic to lance-shaped or egg-shaped, 40–120 mm (1.6–4.7 in) long and 20–60 mm (0.79–2.36 in) wide with more or less toothed edges. The upper surface of the leaves is dark green and impressed above the veins, the lower surface whitish with rust-coloured hairs on the veins. The flowers are borne in loose panicles 80–250 mm (3.1–9.8 in) long and are cream-coloured to greenish-yellow, each flower on a pedicel 1–3.5 mm (0.039–0.138 in) long. The sepals are 1.5–2.0 mm (0.059–0.079 in) long and there are no petals. Flowering occurs in October and November and the fruit is a dark brown, glabrous capsule 3 mm (0.12 in) in diameter containing a single bone-coloured seed.

== Taxonomy ==
Hazel pomaderris was first formally described in 1825 by Augustin Pyramus de Candolle from an unpublished description by Franz Sieber. De Candolle's description was published in his Prodromus Systematis Naturalis Regni Vegetabilis. The specific epithet (aspera) means "rough".

== Distribution and habitat ==
Pomaderris aspera grows in wet forest, especially near streams in gullies and mainly occurs south from Barrington Tops in New South Wales and the Australian Capital Territory, with scattered individuals in northern New South Wales and as far north as Bunya Mountains National Park in Queensland. It is common in southern and eastern Victoria, less so in northern Tasmania and may also occur in South Australia. The species has also been naturalised in New Zealand.
