= Googong Dam =

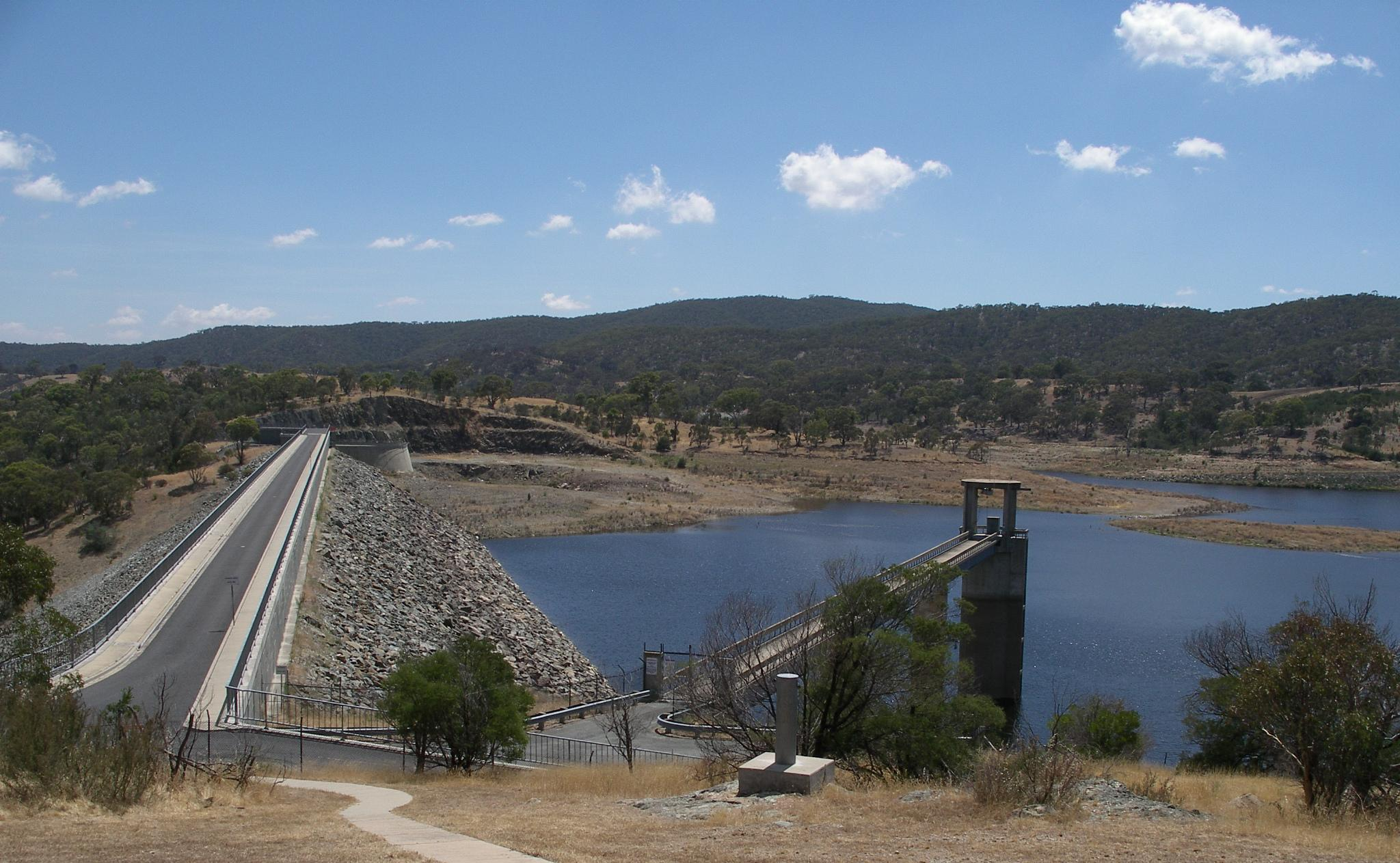
- Googong Dam wall and reservoir, 2006

- Location of the dam in New South Wales
- Interactive map of Googong Dam
- Country: Australia
- Location: Queanbeyan, New South Wales
- Coordinates: 35°25′13″S 149°15′47″E
- Purpose: Water supply
- Status: Operational
- Opening date: 1977
- Owner: Commonwealth of Australia
- Operator: Icon Water

Dam and spillways
- Type of dam: Embankment dam
- Impounds: Queanbeyan River
- Height: 66 m (217 ft)
- Length: 417 m (1,368 ft)
- Elevation at crest: 663 m (2,175 ft) AHD
- Dam volume: 838×10^{3} m^{3} (29.6×10^{6} cu ft) (Note: The main dam volume is 818×10^{3} m^{3} (28.9×10^{6} cu ft); the saddle dam volume is 20×10^{3} m^{3} (710×10^{3} cu ft).)
- Spillways: 2
- Spillway type: Converging chute
- Spillway capacity: 4,300 m^{3}/s (150,000 cu ft/s)

Reservoir
- Creates: Googong Reservoir
- Total capacity: 119,400 ML (96,800 acre⋅ft)
- Catchment area: 873 km^{2} (337 sq mi)
- Surface area: 696 ha (1,720 acres)
- Normal elevation: 659 m (2,162 ft) AHD

The Googong Dam is an earth and rock-fill embankment dam comprising an adjacent saddle embankment across the Queanbeyan River, located upstream of Queanbeyan in the Capital Country region of New South Wales, Australia. The dam's purpose includes water supply for Canberra and Queanbeyan. The impounded reservoir is called Googong Reservoir.

The Googong Dam was created through enabling legislation enacted via the passage of the Canberra Water Supply (Googong Dam) Act, 1974.

== History ==
A green ban was briefly imposed by the Builders Labourers Federation for a few days until adequate assurances that marine life in Lake Burley Griffin would not be harmed.

== Location and features ==
Completed in 1977, the Googong Dam is a minor dam across the Queanbeyan River and Bradleys Creek and is located approximately 5 kilometres (3.1 mi) south of the city of Queanbeyan on the lower reaches of the river. The dam was built by Thiess Bros, based on designs developed by the Commonwealth Department of Construction; and is now managed by Icon Water.

The main earth and rock-filled dam wall is 66 metres (217 ft) high and is 417 metres (1,368 ft) long. The adjacent earth-filled saddle dam is 13 metres (43 ft) high. When full, the resultant reservoir holds 121,083 megalitres (98,164 acre⋅ft) of water, covers approximately 696 hectares (1,720 acres) that is drawn from a catchment area of 873 square kilometres (337 sq mi). The concrete chute spillway is capable of discharging 4,300 cubic metres per second (150,000 cu ft/s).

Successive flood events in 1978 and through the 1980s resulted in extensive erosion in the unlined section of the spillway chute, including a large erosion hole, up to 19 metres (62 ft) deep and 25 metres (82 ft) wide, in the upper part of the spillway chute. Staged remedial works were undertaken in the 1980s to protect the eroded structure. Remediation of spillway facilities occurred from 2006 through to 2010 that resulted in an increase in the capacity of the spillway, construction of walls in the spillway chute extension up to 17 metres (56 ft) high, and a range of other enhancements to meet extreme flood events. In 2016, with more regular spillway overflows and to improve safety for waterway users, Icon Water installed a 240-metre (790 ft) floating safety barrier across the spillway, with a gate for authorised vessel access.

== See also ==
- List of dams and reservoirs in New South Wales
- List of dams and reservoirs in the Australian Capital Territory
