= Cotter River System =

The Cotter River System (CRS) is located in the Australian Capital Territory and was constructed in 1912. A feature of the Namadgi National Park, the Cotter River System is one of two main sources for the Australian Capital Territory's water supply, the other being the Queanbeyan River located north of the Australian Capital Territory in New South Wales. Nevertheless, the Cotter River System is a larger catchment area and due to recent drought conditions the Queanbeyan River has been seen as obsolete in comparison.

Comprising three primary dams, the Cotter River System has been a reliable water source despite low precipitation and high temperatures experienced in the Australian Capital Territory in the past decade.

== See also ==
- Cotter River
