= Bendora Gravity Main =

Details
- Location: Canberra, Australian Capital Territory
- Coordinates: 35°26′49″S 148°49′41″E
- Opened: 5 January 1968
- Length: 19.3 km (12.0 mi)
- North end: Bendora Dam
- South end: Mount Stromlo Water Treatment Plant
- Operator: Icon Water

The Bendora Gravity Main is a water main located in the Australian Capital Territory, Australia. Water in the water main travels 19.3 kilometres (12.0 mi) from the Bendora Dam via gravity to the treatment plant on Mount Stromlo, adjacent to the Cotter Dam pumping station, upstream from the confluence of the Cotter River with the Murrumbidgee River.

== Overview ==
Construction of the water main commenced in 1966 and was opened on 5 January 1968. Prior to the construction of the gravity main, water was stored in Bendora Dam and released into the Cotter River to flow into the Cotter Dam. The gravity main is 1,500 millimetres (59 in) in diameter and is buried nearly its entire length. The water main has the capacity to carry 310 megalitres (250 acre⋅ft) of water per day.

The Bendora Gravity Main also supplies the Mount Stromlo Hydro-Power Station.

== See also ==
- List of dams and reservoirs in the Australian Capital Territory
