= Tidbinbilla River =

Tidbinbilla
- Location of the Tidbinbilla River mouth in the ACT

Location
- Country: Australia
- Territory: Australian Capital Territory
- Region: South Eastern Highlands (IBRA), Capital Country

Physical characteristics
- Source: Brindabella Ranges
  - location: Billy Billy Rocks in Tidbinbilla Nature Reserve
  - coordinates: 35°26′35″S 148°55′31″E
  - elevation: 1,330 m (4,360 ft)
- Mouth: confluence with Paddys River
  - coordinates: 35°25′28″S 148°57′31″E
  - elevation: 618 m (2,028 ft)
- Length: 13 km (8.1 mi)

Basin features
- River system: Murrumbidgee catchment, Murray–Darling basin
- National park: Namadgi NP

The Tidbinbilla River is a perennial stream that is part of the Murrumbidgee catchment within the Murray–Darling basin, in the Australian Capital Territory, Australia.

== Location and features ==
Tidbinbilla River rises on the eastern slopes of the Brindabella Ranges in the south-west of the Australian Capital Territory (ACT), below Billy Billy Rocks in Tidbinbilla Nature Reserve, within Namadgi National Park. The creek flows generally north-east before reaching its confluence with Paddys River, south-west of Tuggeranong Town Centre. The creek descends 708 metres (2,323 ft) over its 13-kilometre (8.1 mi) course.

In the years after the 2003 Canberra bushfires, an existing weir on the river has been used to maintain large downstream ponds, as part of conservation efforts.

== Environmental concerns ==
In 2012, heavy downpours caused damage to the existing river system with erosion damaging the river's ability to hold water. In coordination with local landowners and stakeholders, the Mulloon Institute is currently undertaking rehydration works in order to primarily reduce erosion amongst other benefits.

== See also ==
- List of rivers of Australia
- List of rivers of Australia § Australian Capital Territory
