= Garrett Cotter =

Australian convict (1802–1886)

Garrett Cotter (1802–1886) was an Australian convict. The Cotter River, Cotter Dam and Cotter Road in the Australian Capital Territory are named after him.

From circa 1827, Garret Cotter inhabited the Cotter Valley. Cotter was born in 1802 in County Cork. He had been a ploughman and was transported in 1822 on the Mangles. He received his ticket of leave in 1843 and was working at Currawang on Lake George but became involved in a dispute between his employer and his employer's neighbour and was banished to live beyond the limits of location; in this case west of the Murrumbidgee River. In 1841 he married Anne Russell. After five years of living in the Cotter Valley, he was conditionally pardoned in 1847 and moved to Michelago. He was listed as a squatter of Michelago in 1872. He and Anne had nine children. Garrett died in 1886 and Anne in 1897. Both are buried at Michelago.
