= Australian Gas Light Company =

Former Australian energy company

- Type: Public
- Industry: Electricity generation
- Founded: 1837
- Defunct: 2006
- Fate: Merged
- Successor: AGL Energy
- Headquarters: Sydney, Australia

The Australian Gas Light Company (AGL) was an Australian gas and electricity retailer. It was formed in Sydney in 1837 and supplied town gas for the first public lighting of a street lamp in Sydney in 1841. AGL was the second company to list on the Sydney Stock Exchange. The company gradually diversified into electricity and into a number of different locations. After a combination of a merger and demerger with Alinta in 2006, the business was renamed AGL Energy.

== History ==
In 1837, AGL was given a royal charter charged with the responsibility of lighting Sydney's streets. The lights were lit on 24 May 1841 to celebrate the birthday of Queen Victoria. Town gas was first stored in holder tanks hewn out of solid sandstone at Darling Harbour. Later, a large gas works at Mortlake supplied gas which was used over an area of 600 square kilometres and piped up to 25 kilometres away. The Mortlake Ferry was constructed with the express purpose of delivering workers who lived on the north side of the harbour to their workplace. By 1925, the company was the seventh largest gas undertaking in the British Empire.

In 1976, AGL converted from town gas to natural gas following the opening of the Moomba to Sydney Pipeline. In the later part of the 20th century, the company diversified into electricity generation, buying a stake in the Loy Yang Power Station and ownership of the Kiewa Hydroelectric Scheme, the Wattle Point Wind Farm, and a peak load gas-powered power station near Hallett in South Australia. The company also had significant ownership of gas pipelines plus electricity and gas distribution networks in Australia.

ActewAGL, a joint venture between the Australian Gas Light Company and Icon Water, a government-owned enterprise of the ACT Government, was formed in October 2000 as Australia's first utility joint venture. Twenty-five per cent owned by AGL Energy, ActewAGL provides electricity, natural gas, and telecommunication services to business and residential customers in the Australian Capital Territory and south-east New South Wales.

In 2000, AGL purchased emerging telecommunications provider Dingo Blue from C&W Optus for $22m. AGL closed Dingo Blue down in 2003

AGL had New Zealand assets including a gas distribution system in the Hutt Valley and Porirua area, owned through its 71% owned subsidiary Natural Gas Corporation. This network was sold to Vector in 2004 for NZ$814 million. The company bought Transalta NZ's electricity retail business for NZ$824 million in 2001. Subsequently, selling the electricity retail asset for a loss.

In late 2006, AGL merged with Alinta and then demerged to create separate retail and infrastructure companies. The transactions were executed on 25 October 2006 via two schemes of arrangement, resulting in a revised Alinta holding both companies' combined infrastructure and asset management businesses, and AGL Energy, which holds AGL's energy business as well as approximately one third of Alinta's West Australian retail and cogeneration business (AlintaAGL).

== See also ==
- List of oldest companies in Australia
