= Paddys River (Australian Capital Territory) =

Paddys
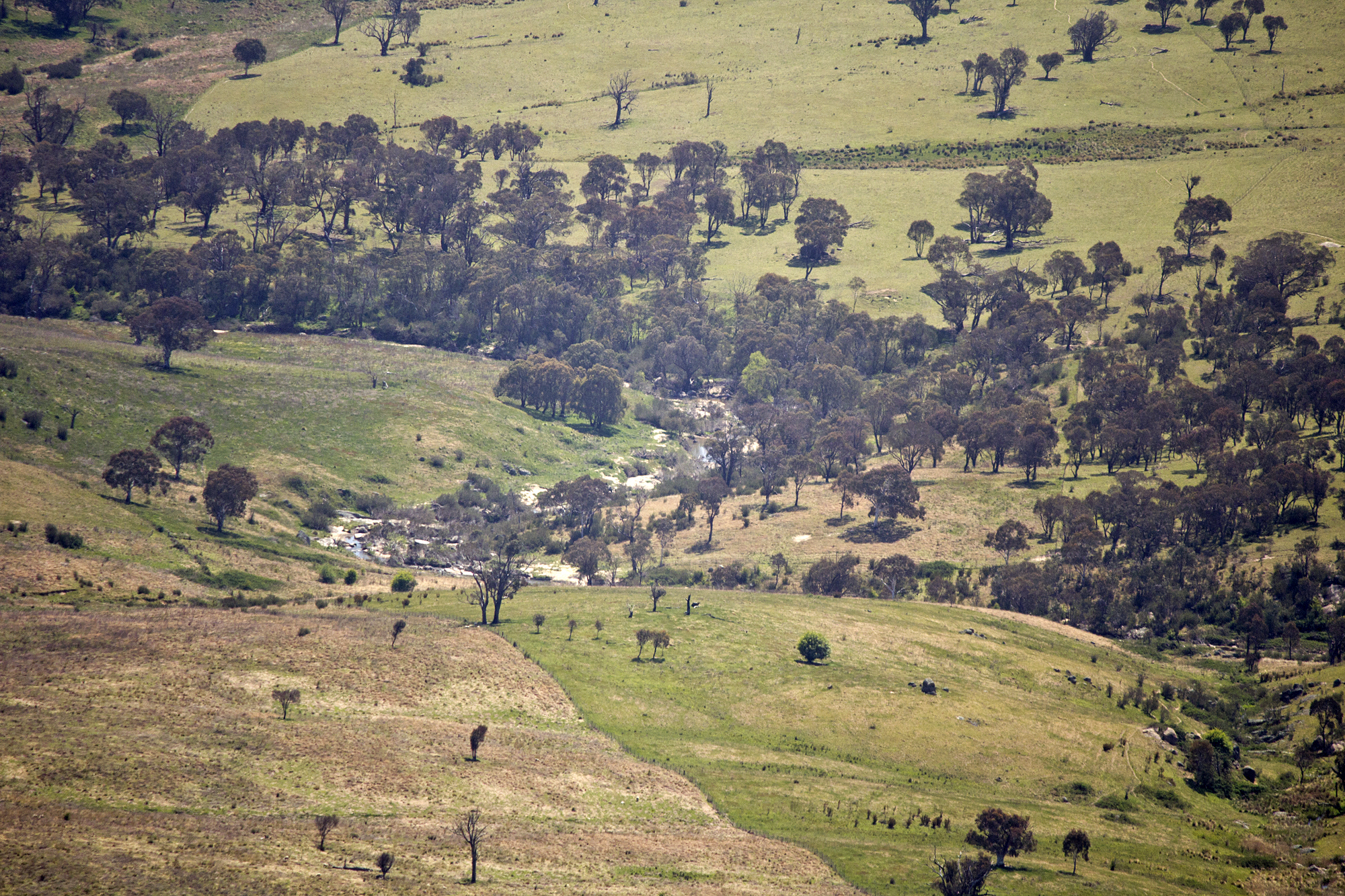
- Paddys River viewed from Gibraltar Peak

- Location of the Paddys River mouth in the ACT

Location
- Country: Australia
- Territory: Australian Capital Territory
- Region: South Eastern Highlands (IBRA), Capital Country

Physical characteristics
- Source confluence: Blue Gum Creek and Punchbowl Creek
  - location: Castle Hill in Tidbinbilla Nature Reserve
  - coordinates: 35°29′32″S 148°58′58″E
  - elevation: 758 m (2,487 ft)
- Mouth: confluence with Cotter River
  - location: below Mount Stromlo
  - coordinates: 35°19′44″S 148°56′19″E
  - elevation: 477 m (1,565 ft)
- Length: 28 km (17 mi)

Basin features
- River system: Murrumbidgee catchment, Murray–Darling basin
- Tributaries
  - left: Gibraltar Creek, Tidbinbilla River
- National park: Namadgi

Paddys River, a perennial stream that is part of the Murrumbidgee catchment within the Murray–Darling basin, is located in the Australian Capital Territory, Australia.

== Location and features ==
Paddys River rises on the eastern slopes of the Brindabella Ranges in the south-west of the Australian Capital Territory (ACT), below Castle Hill in Tidbinbilla Nature Reserve, within Namadgi National Park and is formed by the confluence of Blue Gum Creek and Punchbowl Creek. The river, joined by Tidbinbilla River and Gibraltar Creek, flows generally north-west and to the west of the Canberra suburbs of Conder and Gordon, before reaching its confluence with Cotter River, near Mount Stromlo. The river descends 281 metres (922 ft) over its 28-kilometre (17 mi) course.

== See also ==
- List of rivers of Australia § Australian Capital Territory
