= Corin Dam =

Dam in the Australian capital Territory, Australia

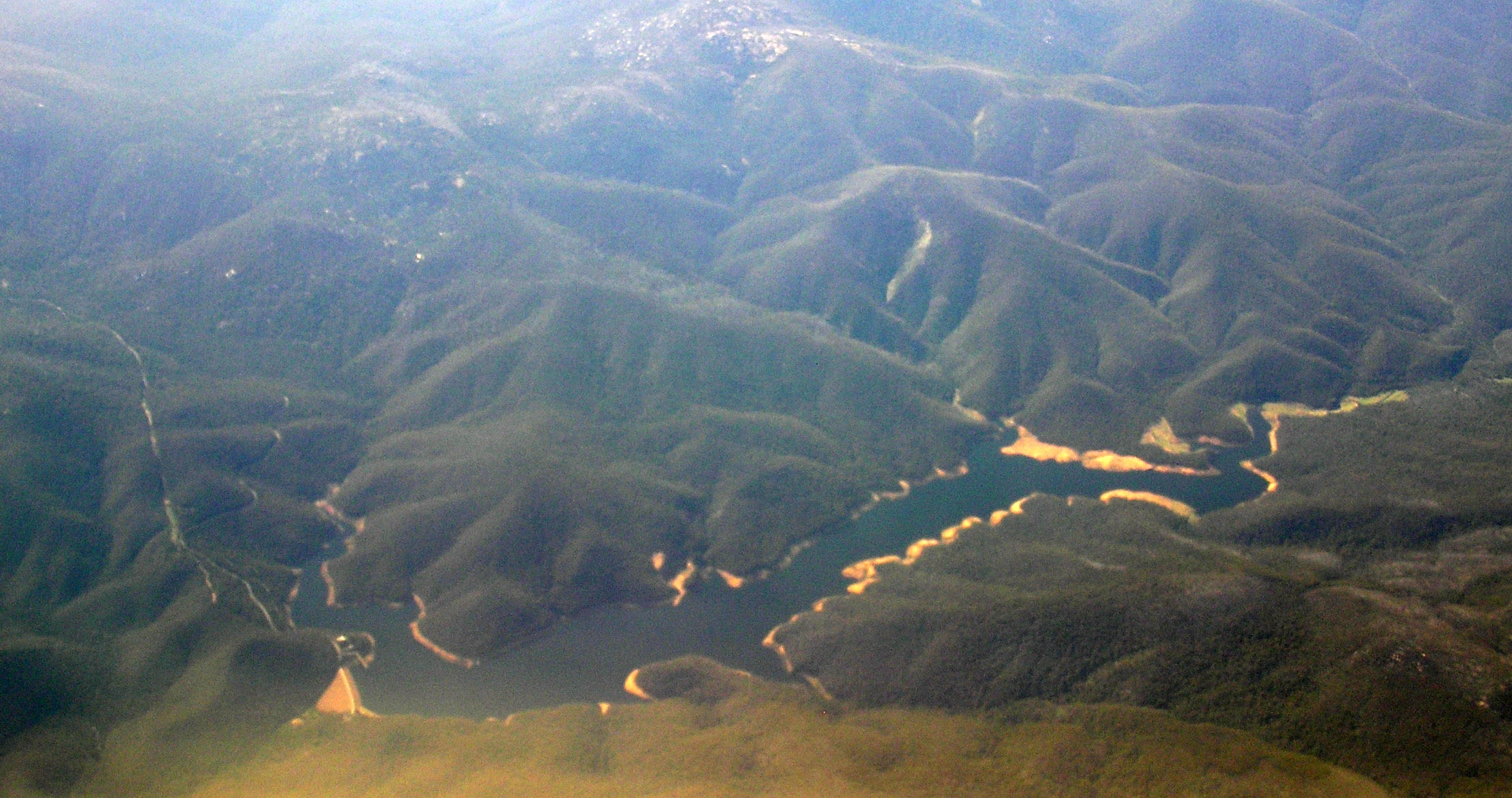
- Corin Reservoir, 2009

- Location of the dam in the ACT
- Interactive map of Corin Dam
- Country: Australia
- Location: Australian Capital Territory
- Coordinates: 35°32′07″S 148°50′12″E
- Purpose: Water supply
- Status: Operational
- Opening date: 1968
- Built by: Thiess Bros
- Owner: Icon Water

Dam and spillways
- Type of dam: Embankment dam
- Impounds: Cotter River
- Height: 74 m (243 ft)
- Length: 282 m (925 ft)
- Dam volume: 1,394×10^{3} m^{3} (49.2×10^{6} cu ft)
- Spillways: 1
- Spillway type: Uncontrolled side channel
- Spillway capacity: 1,190 m^{3}/s (42,000 cu ft/s)

Reservoir
- Creates: Corin Reservoir
- Total capacity: 75,500 ML (61,200 acre⋅ft)
- Active capacity: 70,800 ML (57,400 acre⋅ft)
- Catchment area: 197 km^{2} (76 sq mi)
- Surface area: 315 ha (780 acres)
- Normal elevation: 953 m (3,127 ft) AHD
- Website iconwater.com.au/corin

The Corin Dam is an earth and rockfill embankment dam with an uncontrolled side channel spillway across the Cotter River, located within Namadgi National Park in the Australian Capital Territory, Australia. The impounded reservoir is called the Corin Reservoir which is a supply source of potable water for the city of Canberra and its environs. It is named after William Corin, a pioneer in hydroelectric development in Australia.

== Location and features ==
Constructed by Thiess working from designs prepared by the Commonwealth Department of Works, the Corin Dam was completed and opened in 1968. The earthen dam wall built on a rock foundation is 74 metres (243 ft) high and 282 metres (925 ft) long with a volume of 1,394 thousand cubic metres (49.2×10^{6} cu ft). The wall impounds 75,500 megalitres (61,200 acre⋅ft) of water held within the Corin Reservoir, forming a surface area of approximately 3.15 square kilometres (1.22 mi^{2}) drawn from a catchment area of 197 square kilometres (76 mi^{2}). The uncontrolled side channel spillway is capable of discharging 1,190 cubic metres per second (42,000 cu ft/s) from the reservoir, with a high water level approximately 953 metres (3,127 ft) above sea level.

Water from the Corin, together with the Bendora (downstream) are transferred to the suburbs of Canberra via the Bendora Gravity Main.

== See also ==
- List of dams and reservoirs in the Australian Capital Territory
- Corin Forest
