= Australian Capital Territory Electricity Authority =

A.C.T Electricity Authority
Authority overview
- Formed: 4 July 1963; 63 years ago
- Preceding Authority: Department of the Interior (Canberra)
- Dissolved: 1 July 1988
- Superseding Authority: ACT Electricity and Water Authority
- Jurisdiction: Australian Capital Territory
- Headquarters: Australian Capital Territory
- Authority executive: Paul McGrath, Chief Executive Office (CEO)

The Australian Capital Territory Electricity Authority (ACTE or A.C.T. Electricity Authority) was an authority formed on 1 July 1963 to manage energy supply in the Australian Capital Territory. During the 1950s and 60s Canberra's population was rapidly increasing, causing excessive energy demands and price increases. In response the Minister for the Interior, Sir Gordon Freeth, formed the new Authority. The new authority aimed to allow more consumer input by giving the Australian Capital Territory Advisory Council a seat on the board. Previously the electric supply of Canberra had been managed by the Department of the Interior (Canberra).

On 1 July 1988 the Energy and Water Act 1988 was passed, merging the ACT Electricity Authority and ACT Water into ACT Electricity and Water, later ACTEW.
