= Gibraltar Falls =

Waterfall on the Gibraltar Creek in the Australian Capital Territory

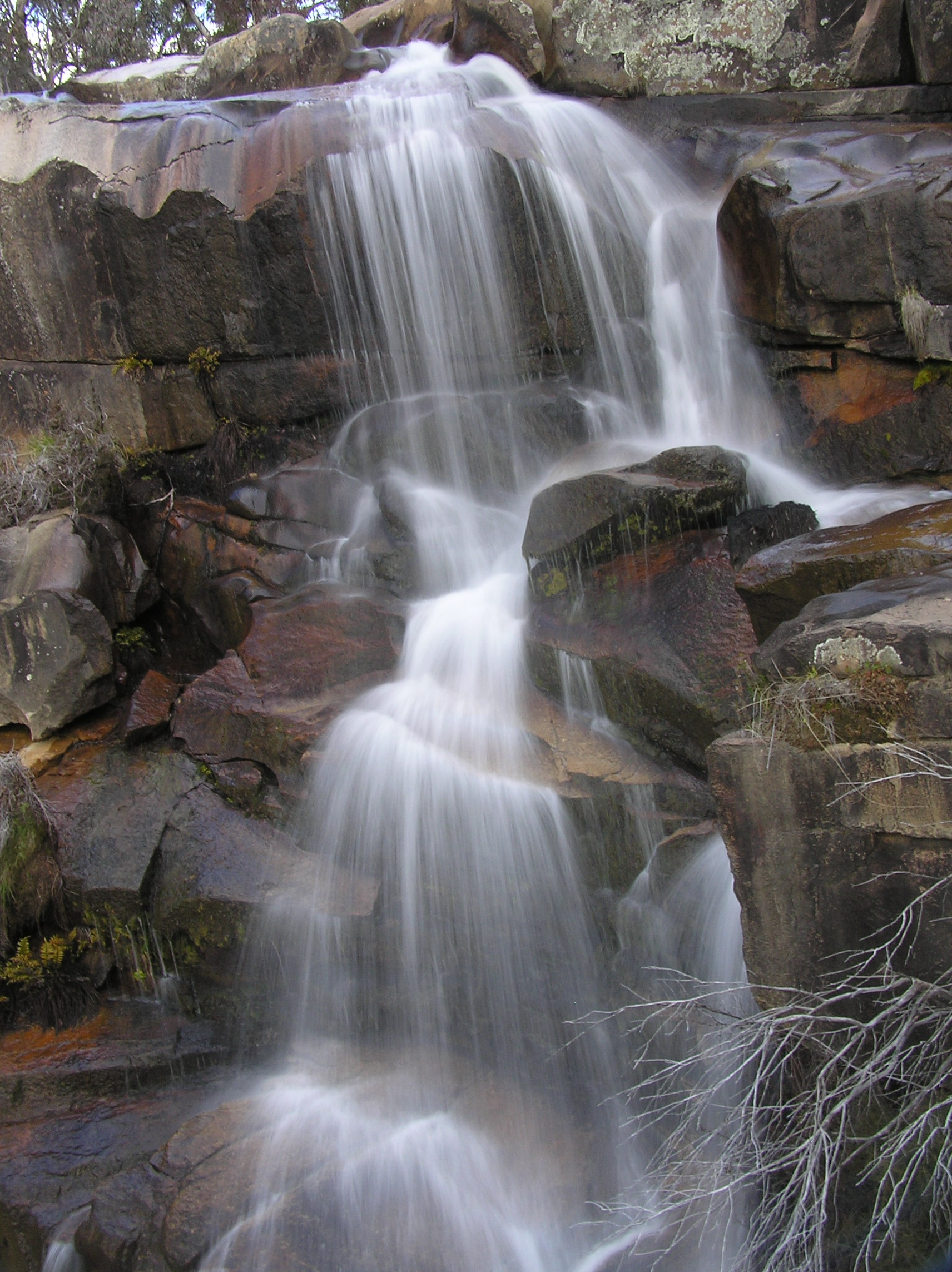
- Gibraltar Falls

- Location within Australian Capital Territory
- Location: Namadgi National Park, Australian Capital Territory
- Coordinates: 35°32′15″S 148°52′42″E
- Type: Cascade
- Total height: 50 metres (160 ft)
- Watercourse: Gibraltar Creek

The Gibraltar Falls are a cascade waterfall on the Gibraltar Creek, in the Australian Capital Territory (ACT), approximately 50 kilometres (31 miles) from Canberra's city centre, The falls have a 50-metre (160-foot) drop.

== Location and features ==
In Namadgi National Park, the falls are near Corin Road in the Gibraltar Creek Pine Forest. A gravel track from a nearby car park provides access to a lookout to view the falls. There are a number of walking trails near the falls. Near the falls is a car park, public toilets, and a picnic shelter with a gas barbecue.

The falls have a 50-metre (160 ft) drop.

There is not much drainage on Gibraltar Falls, though water will still fall from the falls during drought conditions. Three glossy black cockatoos were spotted at the falls in November 2000. These birds are not frequently found in the territory.

The falls were depicted in the 1966 oil painting titled Rescue at Gibraltar Falls, by John Perceval, with Australian National University landscape architect serving as a model for the figure found in the painting. Bushwalks used to take place to get to the falls. The Australian Heritage Commission commissioned a report on the falls called "An archaeological investigation of the Gibraltar Falls recreation area, A.C.T." Axe grinding grooves have been found at the falls.

== Fauna and flora ==
The falls is a habitat of the ACT rare Austral pillwort, a fern with thread-like leaves, and the vulnerable alpine redspot dragonfly.

== Gibraltar Falls / Woods Reserve Area ==
The falls is part of the Gilbralter Falls / Woods Reserve Area that is listed on the Register of the National Estate and the ACT National Heritage of Australia list. It is about 170ha in area and is located about 12 kilometres (7.5 mi) West North-west of Tharwa.

== Incidents ==
In 2023 a 19-year-old swimmer died after falling off the cliffs and into the water. Six days later, another fatal accident occurred resulting in the death of a 22-year-old man.

== See also ==
- List of waterfalls
- List of waterfalls in Australia
