= Bendora Dam =

Dam in the Australian Capital Territory, Australia

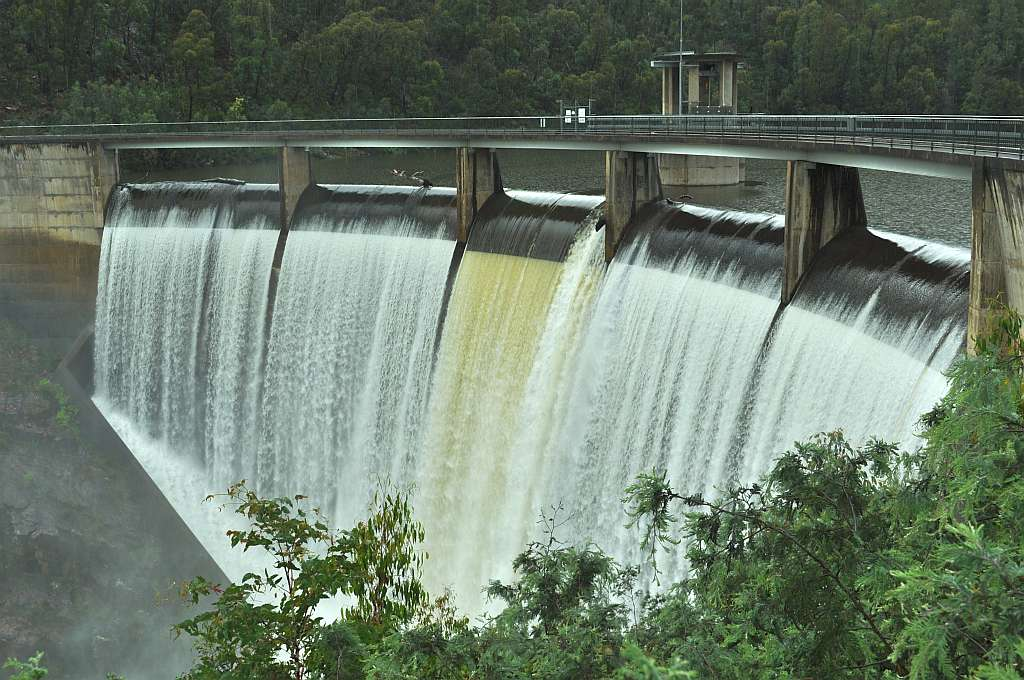
- Bendora Dam in spill, 2010

- Location of the dam in the ACT
- Interactive map of Bendora Dam
- Country: Australia
- Location: Australian Capital Territory
- Coordinates: 35°26′48″S 148°49′42″E
- Purpose: Water supply
- Status: Operational
- Opening date: 1961
- Owner: Icon Water

Dam and spillways
- Type of dam: Arch dam
- Impounds: Cotter River
- Height: 47 m (154 ft)
- Length: 174 m (571 ft)
- Elevation at crest: 778.2 m (2,553 ft) AHD
- Dam volume: 30×10^{3} m^{3} (1.1×10^{6} cu ft)
- Spillways: 1
- Spillway type: Uncontrolled
- Spillway capacity: 1,590 m^{3}/s (56,000 cu ft/s)

Reservoir
- Creates: Bendora Reservoir
- Total capacity: 11,540 ML (9,360 acre⋅ft)
- Catchment area: 290 km^{2} (110 sq mi)
- Surface area: 75 ha (190 acres)
- Normal elevation: 777 m (2,549 ft) AHD
- Website iconwater.com.au

The Bendora Dam is a thin-wall, double curvature concrete arch dam across the upper reaches of the Cotter River, located within Namadgi National Park in the Australian Capital Territory, Australia. The impounded reservoir is called the Bendora Reservoir which is a supply source of potable water for the city of Canberra and its environs.

== Location and features ==
Constructed by E S Clementson working from designs prepared by the Commonwealth Department of Works, the Bendora Dam was completed and opened in 1961 and was the first dam of its type built in Australia. The concrete dam wall built on a rock foundation is 47.2 metres (155 ft) high and 174 metres (571 ft) long with a volume of 30 thousand cubic metres (1.1×10^{6} cu ft). The wall impounds 11,540 megalitres (9,360 acre⋅ft) of water held within the Bendora Reservoir, forming a surface area of approximately 75 hectares (190 acres). The uncontrolled spillway is capable of discharging 1,590 cubic metres per second (56,000 cu ft/s) from the reservoir, with a high water level approximately 778 metres (2,552 ft) above sea level.

Water from the Bendora, together with the Corin (further upstream), is fed to the suburbs of Canberra via the Bendora Gravity Main.

== See also ==
- List of dams and reservoirs in Australia
