= Icon Water =

Icon Water Limited
- Type: Government-owned corporation
- Industry: Public utility
- Founded: 1 July 1995
- Headquarters: Canberra, Australia
- Area served: Australian Capital Territory
- Key people: Carol Lilley (Chair), Joy Yau (Interim Managing Director)
- Services: Drinking water, wastewater, stormwater
- Revenue: ▲ A$517m (2025)
- Operating income: ▼ A$65.4m (2025)
- Net income: ▲ A$61.7m (2025)
- Owner: ACT Government
- Number of employees: 502(2025)
- Subsidiaries: Icon Distribution Investments Limited, Icon Retail Investments Limited, ActewAGL (50%), Ecowise Environmental Pty Limited (50%)
- Website: www.iconwater.com.au

Icon Water Limited, trading principally as Icon Water, is a water and wastewater public utility that is an Australian Capital Territory-owned corporation. The company provides drinking water and wastewater services to the ACT. Icon Water is also a 50% owner of ActewAGL, a multi-utility provider of electricity and gas services in the ACT and south-east New South Wales. Icon Water Limited is also the owner of Bendora Dam, Corin Dam (further upstream), Cotter Dam (further downstream) and Googong Dam in New South Wales. Water is gravity fed to Canberra via the Bendora Gravity Main and pumped from Googong Dam. Icon Water operates, and maintains 50 service reservoirs, 25 pump stations, 2 water treatment plants, 27 sewage pumping stations, 4 sewage treatments plants, over 3,400 km of sewer pipelines and over 3,400 km of water pipelines.

Icon Water Limited is wholly owned by the Government of the Australian Capital Territory, with the only voting shares being held by the Minister for Finance and the Minister for Climate Change, Environment, Energy and Water.

== History and relevant legislation ==
The origins of the Icon Water Limited (previously ACTEW Corporation) go back to the Australian Public Service. The Australian Capital Territory Electricity Authority was established in 1962, with functions transferred from the Commonwealth Government to the ACT Government. In 1988 its functions were transferred to the Australian Capital Territory Electricity and Water Authority.

The ACTEW Corporation was established under the Corporations Act (Cth) in 1995 to take over the Authority's functions. The company was given obligations under the Utilities Act 2000 (ACT), Water Resources Act 2007 (ACT), Environment Protection Act 1997 (ACT), Water and Sewerage Act 2000 (ACT) and the Public Health Act 1997 (ACT).

In October 2000 ACTEW Corporation joined with the Australian Gas Light Company (AGL) to form ActewAGL to jointly provide electricity and gas services in the ACT and south-east New South Wales.

In 2000 ACTEW Corporation entered into a contract with ActewAGL for the management and operation of the water and sewerage network of the ACT and surrounding area. The contract was not renewed in June 2012.

On 4 May 2015 ACTEW Corporation was renamed Icon Water Limited. The reasons given for the change were brand confusion with electricity and gas supplier ActewAGL, the name ACTEW no longer being relevant in the company's operations, disconnect between the company's origin and future.

== See also ==
- ActewAGL
- Bendora Dam
- Cotter Dam
- Googong Dam
- Tantangara Dam
