= Cotter River =

River in the Australian Capital Territory

Cotter
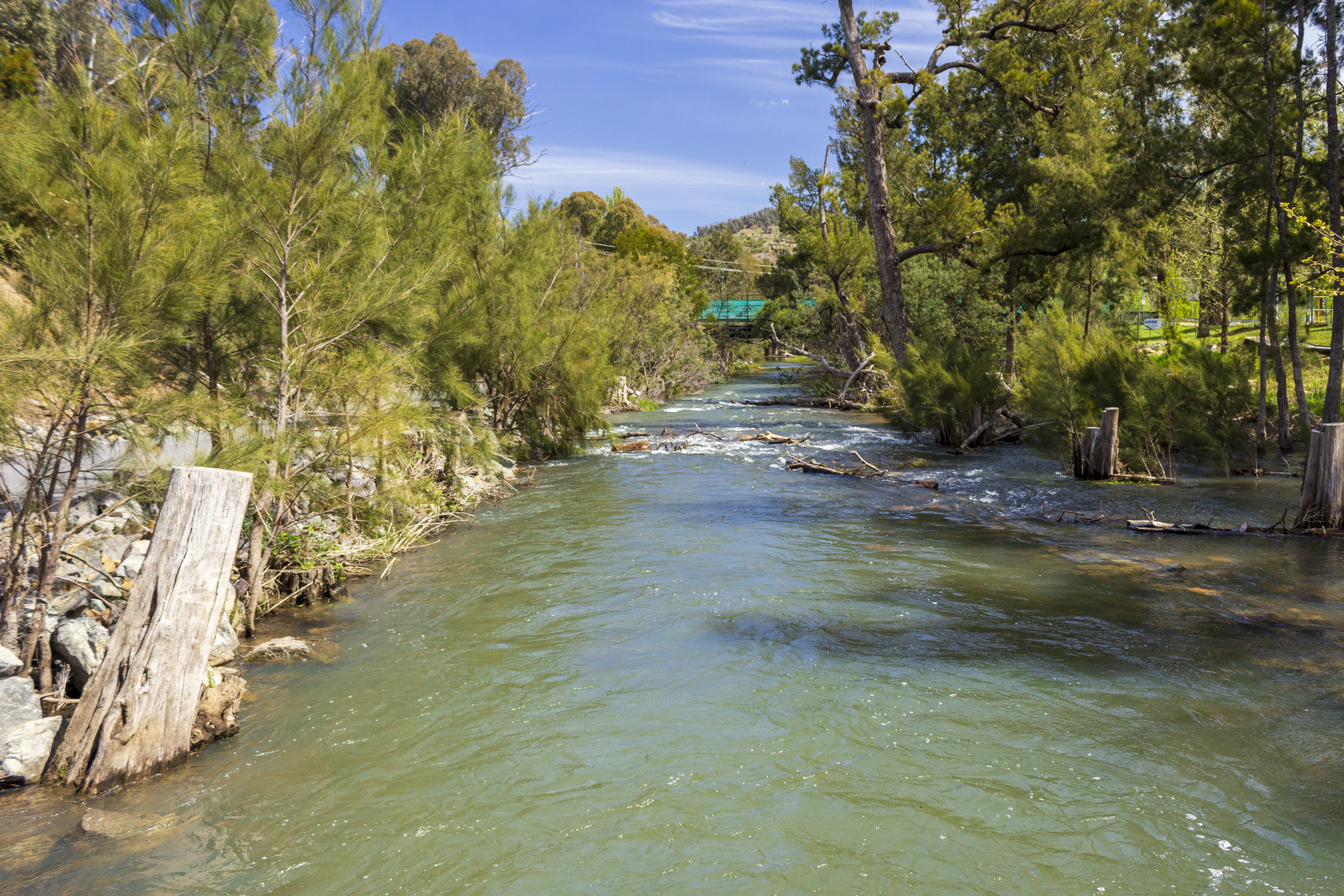
- Cotter River, 2011

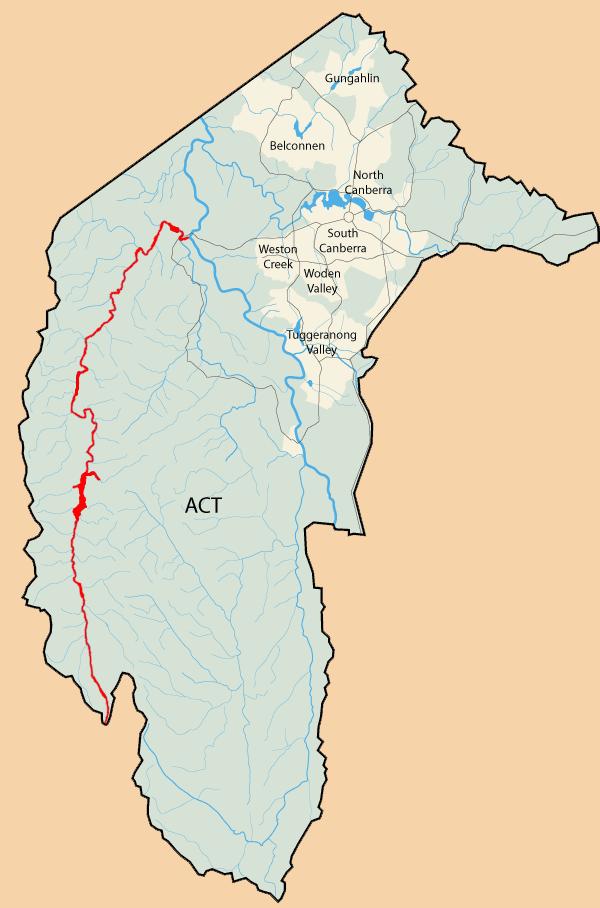
- Map of the Australian Capital Territory, with the Cotter River marked in red
- Etymology: In honour of Garrett Cotter

Location
- Country: Australia
- Territory: Australian Capital Territory
- Region: South Eastern Highlands (IBRA), Capital Country

Physical characteristics
- Source: Scabby Range, Brindabella Ranges
  - location: below Mount Scabby
  - coordinates: 35°44′25″S 148°50′21″E
  - elevation: 1,760 m (5,770 ft)
- Mouth: confluence with the Murrumbidgee River
  - location: Casuarina Sands
  - coordinates: 35°19′27″S 148°57′1″E
  - elevation: 466 m (1,529 ft)
- Length: 76 km (47 mi)
- Basin size: 480.1 km^{2} (185.4 sq mi)
- Discharge
  - location: immediately downstream Corin Dam
  - average: 2.21 m^{3}/s (78 cu ft/s)

Basin features
- River system: Murrumbidgee River, Murray–Darling basin
- Tributaries
  - left: Porcupine Creek, Condor Creek
  - right: Licking Hole Creek, Long Creek (Australian Capital Territory), Kangaroo Creek, Paddys River (Australian Capital Territory)
- Reservoirs: Corin, Bendora and Cotter dams

The Cotter River, a perennial river of the Murrumbidgee catchment within the Murray–Darling basin, is located in the Australian Capital Territory, Australia. The Cotter River, together with the Queanbeyan River, is one of two rivers that provides potable water to the Canberra and Queanbeyan region.

== Course ==
The river rises on the eastern slopes of the Brindabella Ranges in the south-west of the Australian Capital Territory (ACT), within Namadgi National Park, and flows generally north, joined by six minor tributaries, including Paddys River, before reaching its confluence with the Murrumbidgee River, near Casuarina Sands, west of the suburb of Weston Creek. The river descends 1,300 metres (4,300 ft) over its 76 kilometres (47 mi) course.

== History ==
The traditional custodians of the land surrounding the Cotter River are the Aboriginal people of the Ngunnawal clan.

The river was named in honour of Garrett Cotter, an Irish-born convict who was transported to Australia for "the term of his natural life". Cotter was banished from Lake George to the western side of the Murrumbidgee River in 1832. He built a house near the headwaters of the river that was later to bear his name. Cotter was granted a ticket-of-leave in 1843; given a conditional pardon in 1846 that gave him freedom of movement, except in Britain and Ireland; and later lived in Michelago.

When the Government surveyor, Charles Scrivener, recommended Canberra as the best site for Australia's national capital, water catchment was a significant consideration. Some 480 square kilometres (190 mi^{2}) were reserved within the ACT as the catchment area of the Cotter River. The catchment area was calculated to support a planned population of 100,000.

== Dams ==
There are three reservoirs on the river, the Corin, Bendora and Cotter Dams which supply water to Canberra, known as the Cotter River System. Most of the Cotter catchment is in the Namadgi National Park.

== Recreation ==
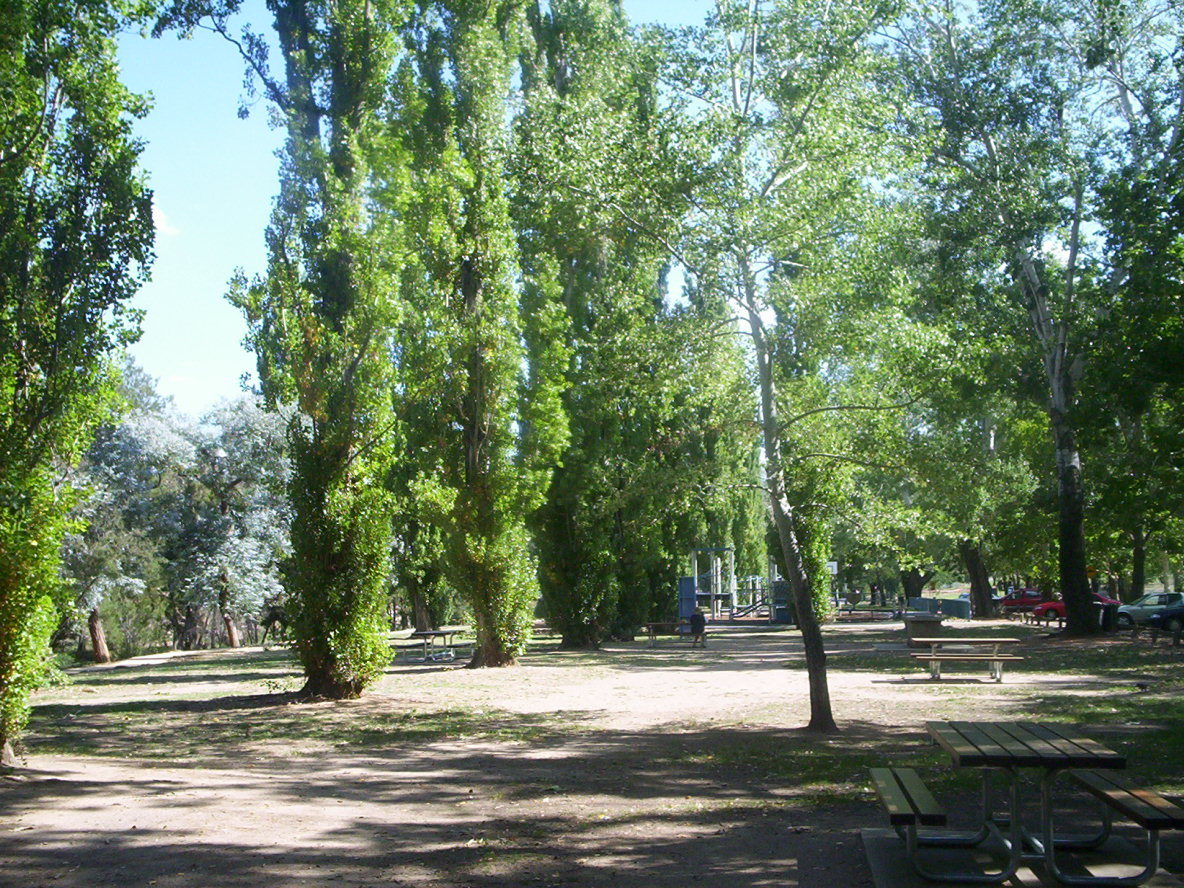
Picnic area adjacent to the Cotter River, near the Cotter Dam, 2005

The Cotter Dam, like other dams and reservoirs within the Cotter Catchment supply domestic drinking water and is therefore closed to recreational watercraft use. The Cotter River Reserve located at the base of the dam wall is a very popular picnic area. The reserve has amenities such as barbecue facilities and tables. There are a number of areas that are suitable for swimming when there is sufficient water flowing in the river. There is also a short term camping site which can accommodate a very limited number of caravans and tents.

The Cotter Road, ACT tourist route 5, begins as a side road off Adelaide Avenue in the suburb of Deakin. The scenic drive stretches 17.6 kilometres (10.9 mi) from the centre of Canberra past the suburbs of Curtin, Holder and Duffy, in between Stromlo Forest and Narrabundah Hill Pine Plantation, and past Casuarina Sands into the Cotter Avenue river area. The Cotter Road and the adjoining 7.1 kilometres (4.4 mi) winding Brindabella Road (the beginning of "The Loop") are well known to motorcyclists, many of whom ride there in the evening after work or on weekends. The Cotter Hotel, which stood near the children's swings alongside the river, was burned down in the 2003 bushfires. It was a well known meeting place amongst motorcyclists on weekends.

The upper section of the Cotter River is also popular with white water kayakers, and features a fast flowing yet scenic grade 3 section. However the river requires high rainfalls for it to flow at a minimum level. There has been a push by local white water paddlers to kayak this section before the dam is completed down stream as it raise the level of the lake drowning the section. Below the dam are also kayaking opportunities. Located near the top picnic area the 'Cotter Play Wave' is the only one in the area and creates playboating opportunities formed by a small weir, however again it requires high flows. From the play wave it is possible to paddle to the confluence of the Murrumbidgee River. Caution is advised as it is prone to strainers formed by trees, weirs and man made objects.

== See also ==
- List of rivers of Australia § Australian Capital Territory
