= ActewAGL =

Multi-utility joint venture company

Coordinates: 35.282°S 149.133°E

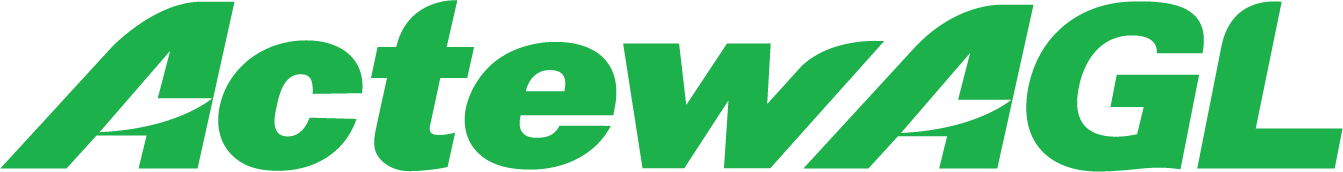

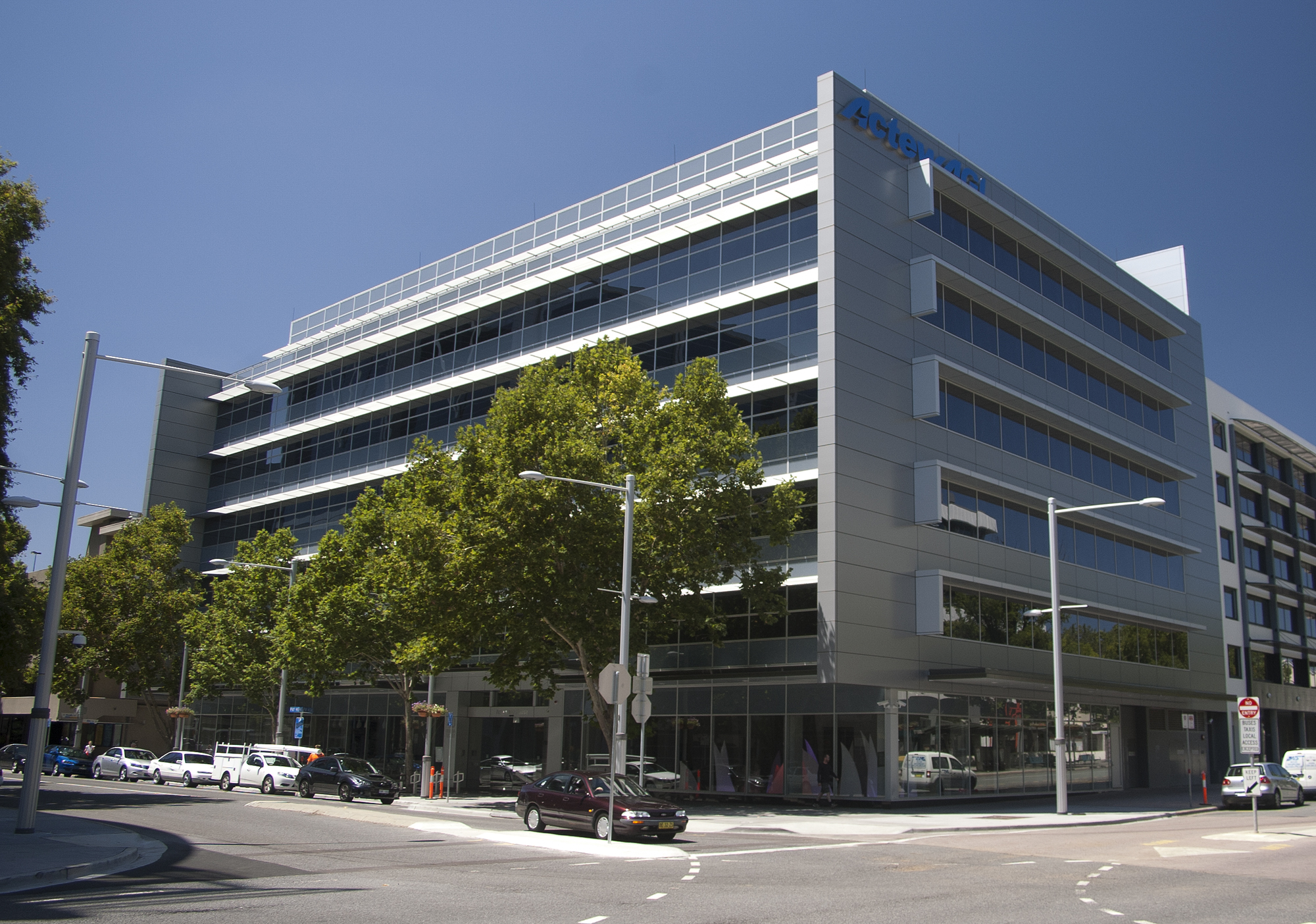
- ActewAGL House in Canberra
- Type: Private
- Industry: Utilities
- Founded: 3 October 2000
- Headquarters: Canberra, Australia
- Key people: Damien Nicks (Chair), John Knox (CEO), Sam Sachse (CFO)
- Products: Utility services: Electricity retailing and distribution, Natural gas
- Revenue: ▼ A$786m (2016)
- Net income: ▼ A$199m (2016)
- Owner: Icon Water 50%, AGL Energy 25%, Jemena 25%
- Number of employees: 800 (3/2017)
- Website: www.actewagl.com.au

ActewAGL is an Australian multi-utility joint venture company that provides utility services in the Australian Capital Territory (ACT) and south-east New South Wales. The company was formed in October 2000 between the Australian Gas Light Company (now AGL Energy) and ACTEW Corporation (now Icon Water).

== History ==
ActewAGL was formed in October 2000 as a joint venture between the Australian Gas Light Company (AGL) and ACTEW Corporation, a government-owned enterprise of the ACT Government.

In 2000, ActewAGL entered into a contract with ACTEW Corporation for the management and operation of the water and sewerage network of the ACT and surrounding area. In February 2004, ActewAGL entered into a management agreement with TransACT Capital Communications Pty Ltd.

In October 2006 ActewAGL's business was reorganised, creating separate retail and distribution entities. AGL and ACTEW Corporation continued as the partners for the retail business and Alinta and ACTEW Corporation became partners of the distribution business. Alinta changed its name in August 2008 to Jemena.

In June 2012, ACTEW Corporation did not renew ActewAGL's water and sewerage management contract.

As of October 2017, ActewAGL is made up of two partnerships:

- ActewAGL Retail — owned equally by Icon Water and AGL Energy via subsidiary companies.
- ActewAGL Distribution — owned equally by Icon Water and Jemena Ltd via subsidiary companies. It operates an electricity distribution network and a gas distribution network in the ACT. The electricity supplies are provided by NSW Electricity Networks over transmission lines owned by TransGrid. Natural gas supplies come via the Eastern Gas Pipeline, owned by Jemena, from the Gippsland Basin, Victoria. On 1 January 2018, the part of ActewAGL Distribution that operates and maintains the ACT electricity and gas network changed its name to Evoenergy.

== Innovation ==
Since its beginning, ActewAGL has continued to undertake several innovative programs to help the environment. They include the following.

- Greenchoice – This is a program that lets residential and business customers support environmentally friendly green energy by paying a premium on their electricity bill (either fixed or percentage based plans). The additional payment is invested in renewable energy generation from sources like mini hydro, wind power and biomass. The Greenchoice program is independently assessed by the Australian government's National Green Power Accreditation Program to guarantee that the green energy produced by ActewAGL comes from government-approved renewable energy sources.
- ActewAGL hydro – While most hydro-electric developments require the building of dams and lakes, ActewAGL's mini-hydro uses an existing water supply to provide electricity that would otherwise come from fossil-fuel power stations.
- Solar farm – In early 2008 ActewAGL worked with the ACT Government to study the feasibility of developing a solar farm in the ACT. The study investigated the environmental impact, economic viability, and educational benefits of such a facility. In May 2009 the ACT Government called for expressions of interest to construct, own and operate a solar power facility in the ACT. The government specified the facility must be capable of delivering power to at least 10,000 Canberra homes. ActewAGL responded to this request and in December 2009 were advised that they had been shortlisted to move through to the next stage of the selection process.
- Canberra will be the first Australian city to pilot a publicly-available Hydrogen Refuelling Station (HRS) with ActewAGL commencing the construction of the station in early 2020. The construction of the station and provision of vehicles are the result of a partnership between the ACT Government, ActewAGL and renewable energy developer Neoen. COVID-19 has caused delays in commissioning of the station. The 20 Hyundai Nexo hatchbacks which have been added to the ACT Government fleet, making up Australia's largest fleet of hydrogen-powered cars, have arrived in Canberra and await the opening of the station.
- ActewAGL is pioneering a world-first electric vehicle (EV) vehicle-to-grid (V2G) trial with $2.4 million in funding from the Australian Renewable Energy Agency (ARENA). As batteries on wheels, V2G technology allows EVs to discharge electricity back to the grid or even provide services to improve grid security. The Realising Electric Vehicle-to-Grid Services (REVS) project will see 51 Nissan LEAF EVs deployed across the ACT to test and provide V2G services. The REVS project is a whole of industry collaboration including the ACT Government (fleet owner), Australian National University (research), Evoenergy (electricity network owner), JET Charge (charging infrastructure), Nissan (vehicle manufacturer) and SG Fleet (fleet manager), all who have collectively supported the project contributing a further $3.86m. Accenture is supporting the REVS project with project management services and insights on the global EV landscape. The REVS project ran until February 2022.
- ActewAGL has research partnerships with the Australian National University, Deakin University and the Canberra Institute of Technology in areas of innovation including renewable hydrogen, energy efficiency and electric vehicles. In 2020 Dr Lee White of ANU's School of Regulation and Global Governance (RegNet) was named winner of the Icon Water and ActewAGL Perpetual Endowment Fund and will spend 12 months collaborating with ActewAGL to determine the impact of housing energy efficiency on bill changes, driven by time-of-use rates.

== Evoenergy ==
Evoenergy is the name used by the electricity poles and wires, and gas pipes business and is part of the ActewAGL Distribution partnership. Evoenergy owns and operates over 2,000 km of electricity network and over 4,500 km of gas mains.

In 2018, Evoenergy partnered with the Canberra Institute of Technology (CIT) to build a first-of-its-kind hydrogen test facility to test how hydrogen interacts with network materials, work practices and equipment. The study so far has verified that the underground 200kPa plastic network is compatible with 100 percent hydrogen.

In March 2020, Evoenergy was awarded $2.05 million in funding from the Australian Renewable Energy Agency (ARENA) to research and test the impact of distributed energy resources on Canberra's energy market. The project will involve working in close collaboration with Schneider Electric, GreenSync, and Withywindle, and will explore the effect that distributed energy resources such as solar photovoltaics (PV), battery installations and electric vehicles have on the electricity network, and how these resources can be used by customers to their full potential.

In September 2020, Evoenergy received a $250,000 grant from the ACT Government to provide home batteries for 75 homes as part of the Ginninderry Residential Battery Trial. Ginninderry Estate is one of Canberra's first all-electric suburbs and the project will provide Evoenergy with the opportunity to analyse solar and battery usage patterns.
