= Capital Country =

- Region
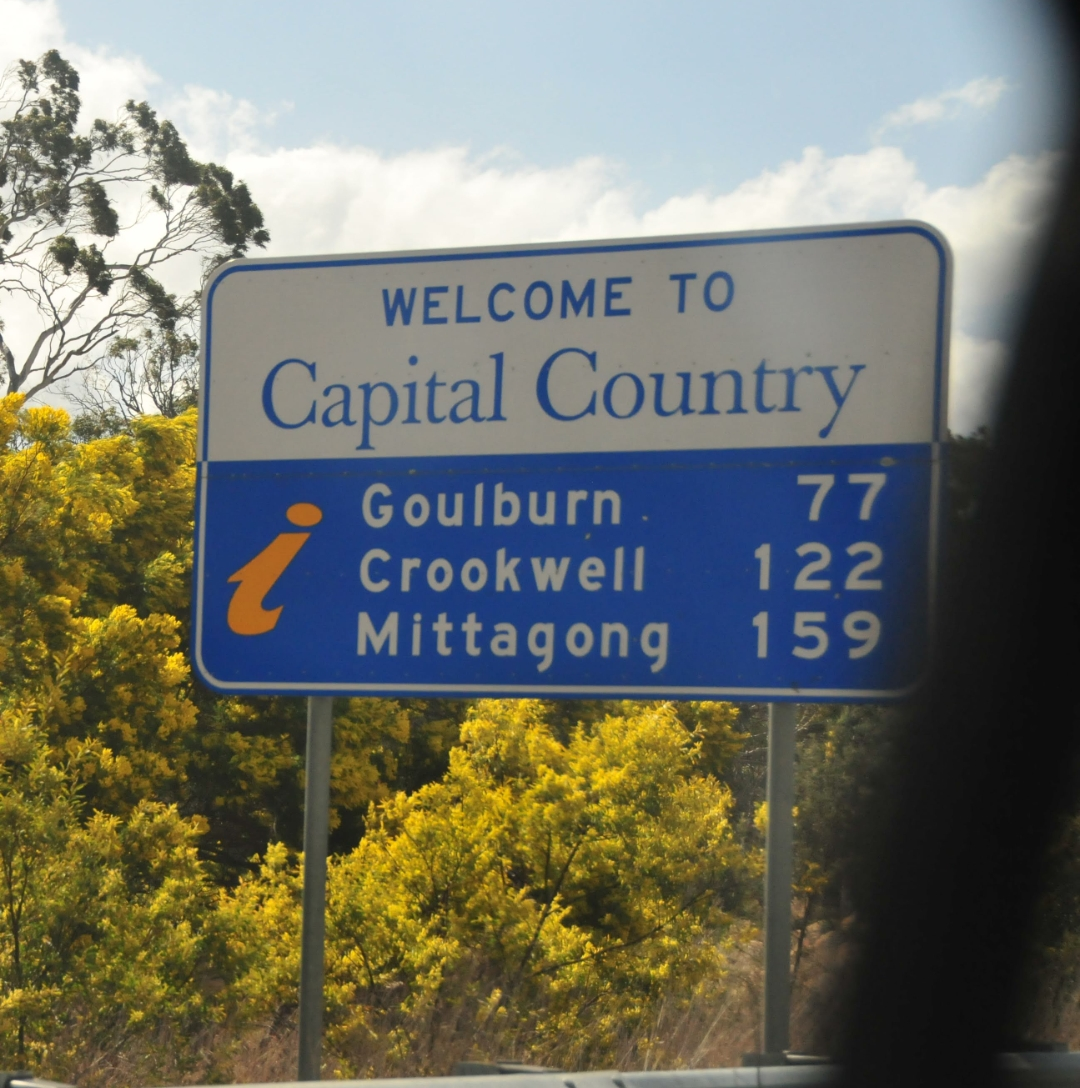
- Welcome sign near Sutton outside Canberra

- Coordinates: 34.482°S 150.418°E
- Country: Australia
- State: New South Wales
- LGA: Goulburn Mulwaree; Hilltops; Queanbeyan Palerang; Upper Lachlan; Wingecarribee; Yass Valley
Regions around Capital Country
South West Slopes	Southern Tablelands	Southern Tablelands
South West Slopes	Capital Country	Monaro
Riverina	Snowy Mountains	South Coast

Capital Country is one of the sixteen tourism regions of New South Wales, Australia. It encompasses the Southern Highlands and the Southern Tablelands, including the Canberra District wine region, and borders the Monaro which surrounds the southern half of Canberra. It also sits roughly on the traditional lands of the Ngunnawal and Gandangara Peoples.

The Capital area is one of the oldest agrarian areas of NSW and is a commuter region of Canberra, the nation's capital, and is to the southwest of Sydney via the Main Southern railway line and Bombala railway line.

The towns and villages in Capital Country range from sophisticated to quaint; their surrounding areas are mostly rural. Capital Country is known for historical venues, antiques stores, and established open gardens. The major cities include Canberra, Queanbeyan, and Goulburn. Towns include:

- Bowral
- Braidwood
- Bundanoon
- Bungendore
- Crookwell
- Gundaroo
- Gunning
- Hall
- Mittagong
- Murrumbateman
- Marulan
- Tarago
- Yass
- Young

Some permanent attractions and events in Capital Country are:

- International Cricket Hall of Fame in Bowral
- Brigadoon in Bundanoon
- Bungendore Village Square
- Garden Ramble, Bundanoon
- Kennerton Green one of Australia's most famous gardens, in Mittagong.
- Trail Ride, Tallong
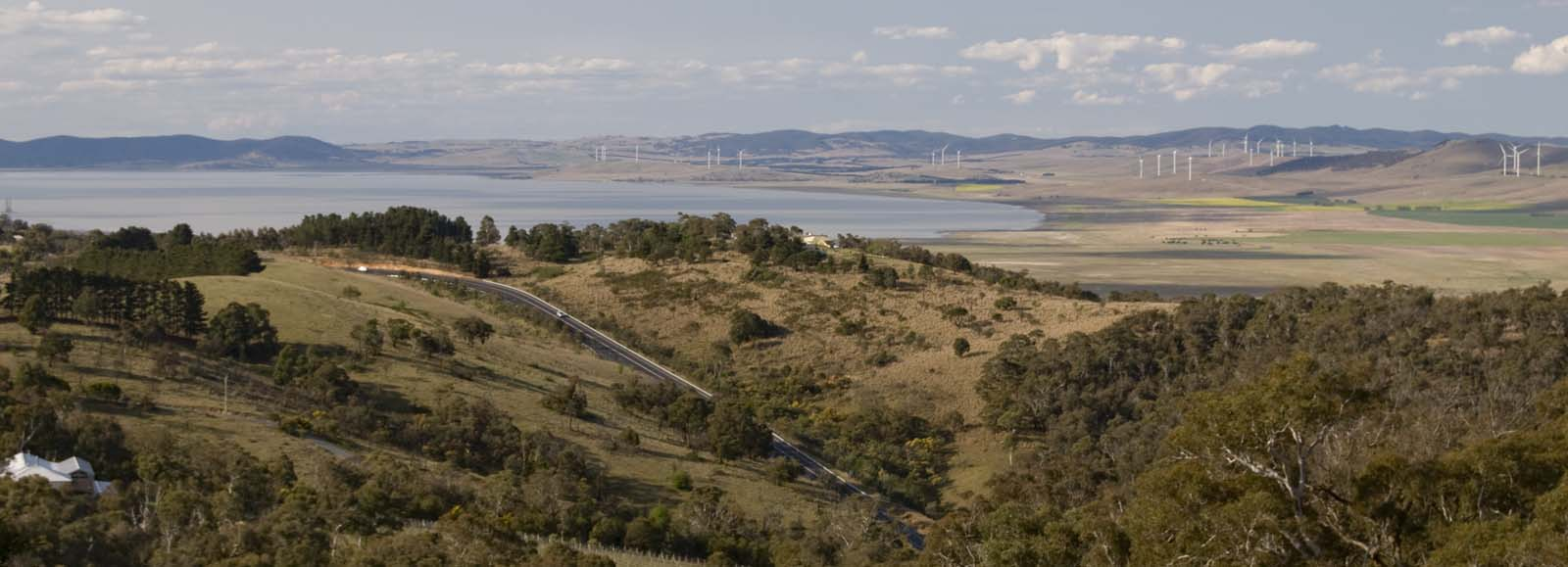
Capital Wind Farm seen across Weereewa / Lake George
