= Yaouk =

- Town
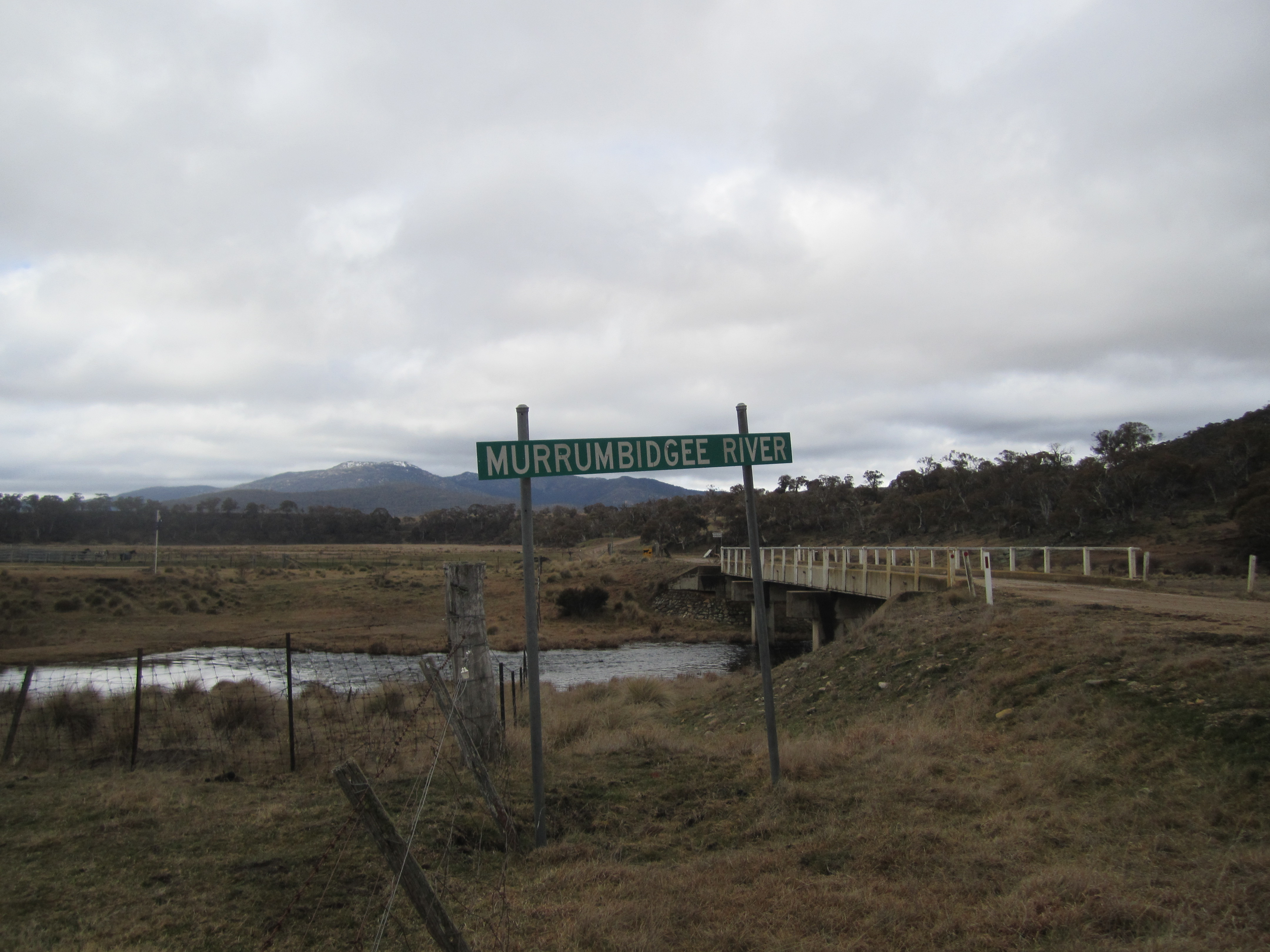
- Murrumbidgee River at Yaouk

- Coordinates: 35°48′57″S 148°48′02″E
- Country: Australia
- State: New South Wales
- Region: Monaro
- LGA: Snowy Monaro Regional Council
- Location: 22 km (14 mi) N of Adaminaby; 108 km (67 mi) S of Canberra; 75 km (47 mi) NW of Cooma

Government
  - State electorate: Monaro
  - Federal division: Eden-Monaro

Population
  - Total: 25 (2016 census)
- Postcode: 2629
- County: Cowley
- Parish: Yaouk
Localities around Yaouk
| Tantangara | ACT | ACT |
| Nungar | Yaouk | Shannons Flat |
| Nungar | Adaminaby | Bolaro |

Yaouk (/ˈjaɪæk/) is a locality in the Snowy Monaro Region, New South Wales, Australia. It lies in open grassland valleys surrounded by mountains on both sides of the Murrumbidgee River, downstream from and east of the Tantangara Dam, north of Adaminaby, east of the Kosciuszko National Park and south of the Namadgi National Park in the Australian Capital Territory, but separated from it by the mountainous Scabby Range. It is about 110 km south of Canberra and about 75 km northwest of Cooma. At the 2016 census, it had a population of 25.

== History ==
The Walgalu-speaking ‘Namadgi band’, led by Onyong, held the district before the invasion, as attested in the Janevale blanket list of 1834.

Yaouk is named after the Yaouk Run, a "squatter's run" first held by Henry Hall in 1838. Hall appears to have established his cattle run at Yaouk when the impact of the catastrophic 1838-1840 drought first hit NSW. Many of the pastoralists sought new pastures in the Alps at this time. He ran beef cattle at Yaouk and sheep, dairy cattle, and a few angora goats at his original Charnwood station at Ginninderra.

James Blake seems to have been the overseer in charge of a group of convicts managing about 600 head of cattle and some horses at Yaouk, before Henry Hall began living in the district himself. Blake was succeeded by William Penniston.

Nearby Naas was a well-known refuge site during the Frontier Wars in the district and it was not long until Hall clashed with the Namadgi leader, Onyong, whom he shot in the thigh c. 1839, when he found him spearing cattle. This incident most likely occurred at Hall’s property at Yaouk. Samuel Shumack reported that Hall’s treatment of Aboriginal people was ‘vile’. Shortly before the shooting of Onyong, Commissioner Henry Bingham had disarmed a group of Aboriginal men at Yaouk.

A boiling-down works (for tallow production) was established at Yaouk during the 1840s when livestock prices had plummeted. Archibald McKeahnie, whose family held properties close by, tried to purchase the Yaouk run in 1864, but pulled out at the last minute due to financial difficulties. Lachlan Cochrane purchased the property instead. He was renowned for his horsemanship.

== Heritage listing ==
Yaouk has a number of heritage-listed sites, including:

- Sams River Fire Trail: Scabby Range Nature Reserve
