= Scabby =

Scabby may refer to:

== People ==
- William Cragh, Welsh medieval warrior, also known as "William the Scabby".
- Cathal Carragh Ua Conchobair, King of Connacht from 1189 to 1202, who was nicknamed "scabby".
- Amlaíb Cenncairech, a Norse ruler whose name is often translated into "scabby head".
- Peibio Clafrog, whose name translates as "scabby" or "leprous".

== Places ==
- Scabby Range Nature Reserve, a nature reserve in Australia
- Mount Scabby, a mountain in Australia

== Other ==
- A name given to Inflatable rats, which are frequently used at trade union protests and strikes.
- Orf (disease), colloquially known as "scabby mouth".
- A UK variant of Old maid (card game) called "scabby queen".
