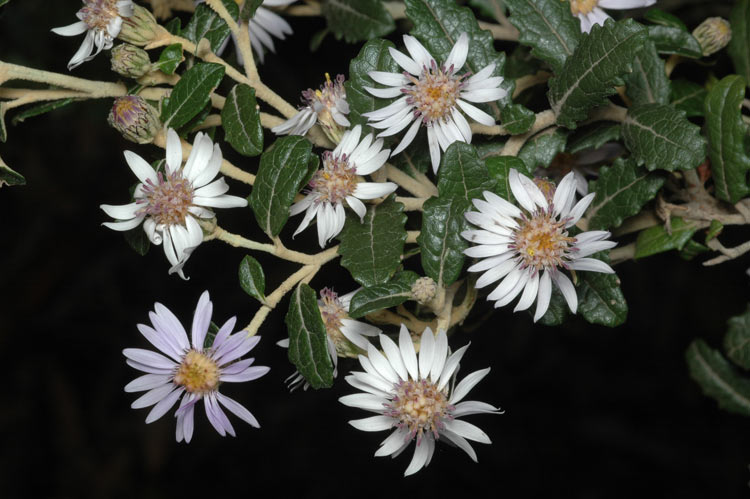
- In the Australian National Botanic Gardens

Scientific classification
- Kingdom: Plantae
- Clade: Tracheophytes
- Clade: Angiosperms
- Clade: Eudicots
- Clade: Asterids
- Order: Asterales
- Family: Asteraceae
- Genus: Olearia
- Species: O. montana

Binomial name
- Olearia montana Lander

= Olearia montana =

Species of shrub

Olearia montana is a species of flowering plant in the family Asteraceae and is endemic to the Southern Tablelands of New South Wales. It is a shrub with hairy, elliptic leaves with toothed edges, and mauve and purple daisy-like inflorescences.

== Description ==
Olearia montana is a shrub that typically grows to a height of up to 2 m (6 ft 7 in), its stems and bracts covered with star-shaped hairs. The leaves are arranged alternately, scattered, elliptic, 13–43 mm (0.51–1.69 in) long and 7–18 mm (0.28–0.71 in) wide with toothed edges, on a petiole up to 5 mm (0.20 in) long. The lower surface of the leaves is covered with felt-like hairs, similar to those on the stems. The heads or daisy-like "flowers" are arranged in panicles and are 18–27 mm (0.71–1.06 in) in diameter on a peduncle up to 15 mm (0.59 in) long. There are three or four rows of bracts at the base of each head, forming a hemispherical involucre. Each head has 17 to 28 mauve ray florets, the ligules narrowly elliptic and 6–9 mm (0.24–0.35 in) long, surrounding 15 to 31 purple disc florets. Flowering occurs in September and October and the fruit is a glabrous achene, the pappus with 35 to 71 bristles.

== Taxonomy ==
Olearia montana was first formally described in 1991 by Nicholas Sèan Lander in the journal Telopea from plant material collected in the Tinderry Mountains by Thomas Gordon Hartley in 1971. The specific epithet (montana) refers to the montane habit of this species.

== Distribution and habitat ==
Olearia montana grows in forest and woodland in the Tinderry, Brindabella and Scabby Ranges on the Southern Tablelands of New South Wales.
