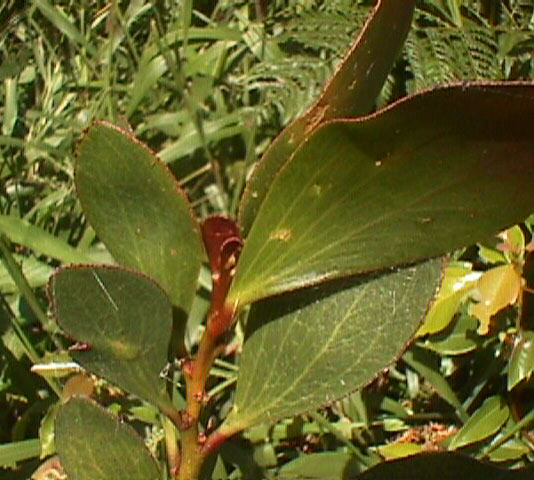

Conservation status
- Critically Endangered (IUCN 3.1)

Scientific classification
- Kingdom: Plantae
- Clade: Embryophytes
- Clade: Tracheophytes
- Clade: Angiosperms
- Clade: Eudicots
- Clade: Rosids
- Order: Fabales
- Family: Fabaceae
- Subfamily: Caesalpinioideae
- Clade: Mimosoid clade
- Genus: Acacia
- Species: A. phlebophylla

Binomial name
- Acacia phlebophylla H.B.Will.
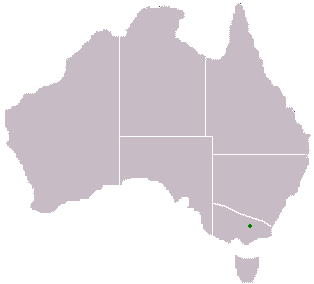
- Range of Acacia phlebophylla

Synonyms
- Acacia longifolia (Andrews) Willd. var. phlebophylla F.Muell.; Acacia phlebophylla F. Muell.; Acacia sophorae (Labill.) R.Br. var. montana F.Muell.

= Acacia phlebophylla =

Species of legume

Acacia phlebophylla, also known by the names Buffalo sallow wattle and Mount Buffalo wattle, is a shrub to small tree of the family Fabaceae. It grows up to a maximum of 6 metres (20 ft) tall and has wide, rounded asymmetrical phyllodes. It is a critically endangered species only known from the high elevation granite slopes of Mount Buffalo National Park in Victoria, Australia.

== Description ==
Acacia phlebophylla is a tree or shrub, growing up to 3 metres (9.8 ft) tall and occasionally reaching heights of up to 6 m (20 feet) tall. Its phyllodes are oblanceolate, obovate or elliptic and commonly asymmetrical in shape, 4–14cm long and 1.5–6cm wide with prominent nerves and reticulated veins.

Deep yellow rod-like flowers appear in June–December, widely scattered on 1-2 spikes per axil 4–7cm long. The fruits are straight or slightly curved legumes, 7–10cm long and appear in November–March, releasing 5–10 elliptical seeds, 5–7.5mm long.

=== Similar species ===
This species is closely related to A. alpina, which can be distinguished by being much larger in all parts, having irregularly resinous margins and having a woodier fruit. Acacia phlebophylla is known to hybridize with A. alpina at the northernmost of its range with and A. dallachiana as it approaches the taller forest habitat of the species.

== Distribution and habitat ==
This species is known only from Mount Buffalo National Park with an estimated 25 to 40 subpopulations. It mostly occurs woodlands and heathlands on steep slopes between 500-1200m above sea level. It grows in shallow to skeletal soils of granite, often amongst boulders.

== Conservation ==
Acacia phlebophylla is listed as critically endangered on the IUCN Red List of Threatened Species and the Flora and Fauna Guarantee Act 1998 threatened list. It is restricted to the single location of a few sites on the Mount Buffalo massif with an estimated extent of occurrence of less than 100 km^{2} where it is locally abundant within some subpopulations. Its current population trend is unknown, though population estimates range from 250-500 mature individuals.

The main threats to this species include infection by the gall fungus Uromycladium tepperianum, (a native fungus common among many acacias) an increase in wildfire frequency and intensity and collection for use for use as a psychotropic.

Attempts at ex-situ cultivation have been mostly unsuccessful and have usually resulted in plants dying at 3 years. Healthy plants exist in private gardens near Gatton, Queensland as well near Meadows in South Australia and in Ireland, indicating the plant is not as recalcitrant in cultivation or restricted to its alpine environment as was once thought.

== Uses ==
Acacia phlebophylla is one of the purest natural sources of the psychedelic drug dimethyltryptamine, also known as DMT, which occurs as the predominant alkaloid throughout the plant.

Recent reports on regrowth after the 2006 bushfires indicates that the phyllodes of young plants have little to no dimethyltryptamine content. This is presumed to be due to the young age of the plants versus the old growth that stood before the fire.
