= Mount Kelly =

Mountain in the Australian Capital Territory

- Location within Australian Capital Territory

Highest point
- Elevation: 1,829 m (6,001 ft)
- Prominence: 489 m (1,604 ft)
- Coordinates: 35°43′S 148°53′E

Geography
- Location: Australian Capital Territory / New South Wales, Australia
- Parent range: Scabby Range

Mount Kelly is a mountain with an elevation of 1,829 metres (6,001 ft) AHD that is the tallest peak in the Scabby Range and is situated on the border of the Australian Capital Territory and New South Wales, Australia. The summit of the mountain is located within the ACT. The nearest town to the mountain is Adaminaby, approximately 32.8 kilometres (20.4 mi) to the south.

The ACT portion of the mountain is located within Namadgi National Park and the NSW side within the Scabby Nature Reserve and Kosciuszko National Park. The Scabby Range includes Mount Scabby, at 1,798 metres (5,899 ft) AHD, which forms part of the catchment area for the Cotter River. The area surrounding Mount Kelly is a wilderness area which was severely affected by the Canberra bushfires of 2003.

== See also ==
- Australian Alps
- List of mountains of Australia § New South Wales
