= Australian Alps National Parks and Reserves =

Group of protected areas in Australia

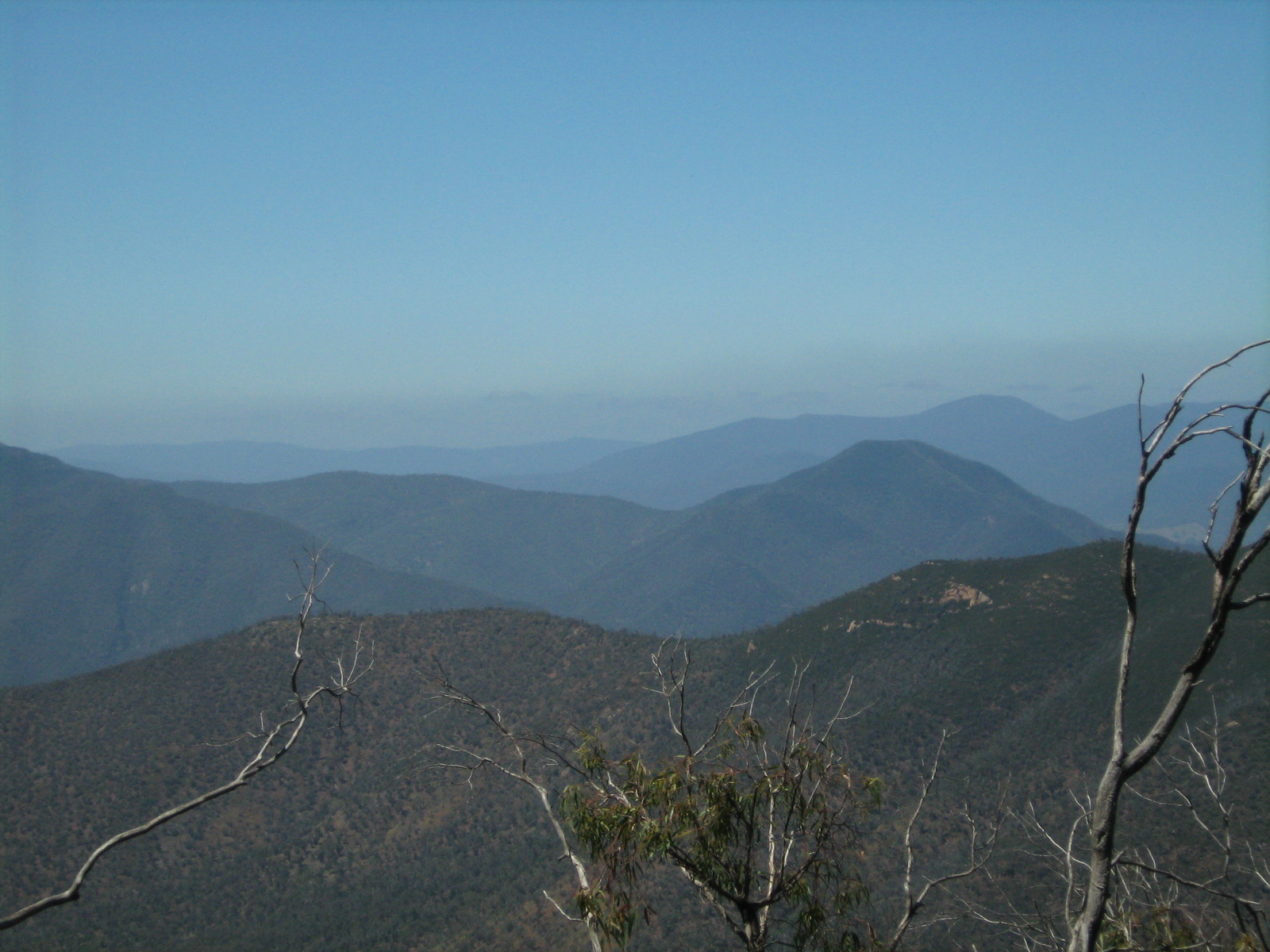
- The Australian Alps viewed from Snowy River Road, near Suggan Buggan, Victoria.
- Interactive map of Australian Alps National Parks and Reserves
- Location: Australia
- Nearest city: Canberra
- Coordinates: 37°S 148°E
- Area: 16,531.80 km^{2} (6,382.96 sq mi)
- Established: 7 November 2008
- Governing body: NSW National Parks & Wildlife Service; Parks Victoria; Territory and Municipal Services (ACT)
- Website: http://www.environment.gov.au/node/19632

The Australian Alps National Parks and Reserves is a group of eleven protected areas consisting of national parks, nature reserves and one wilderness park located in the Australian Capital Territory, New South Wales and Victoria and which was listed as a "place" on the Australian National Heritage List on 7 November 2008 under the Environment Protection and Biodiversity Conservation Act 1999. The listing which covers an area of 16,531.80 square kilometres (6,382.96 sq mi), contains the vast majority of alpine and sub-alpine environments in Australia. The listing includes the following protected areas - Alpine, Baw Baw, Brindabella, Kosciuszko, Mount Buffalo, Namadgi and Snowy River national parks; the Avon Wilderness Park, and the Bimberi, Scabby Range and Tidbinbilla nature reserves.

== Gallery ==
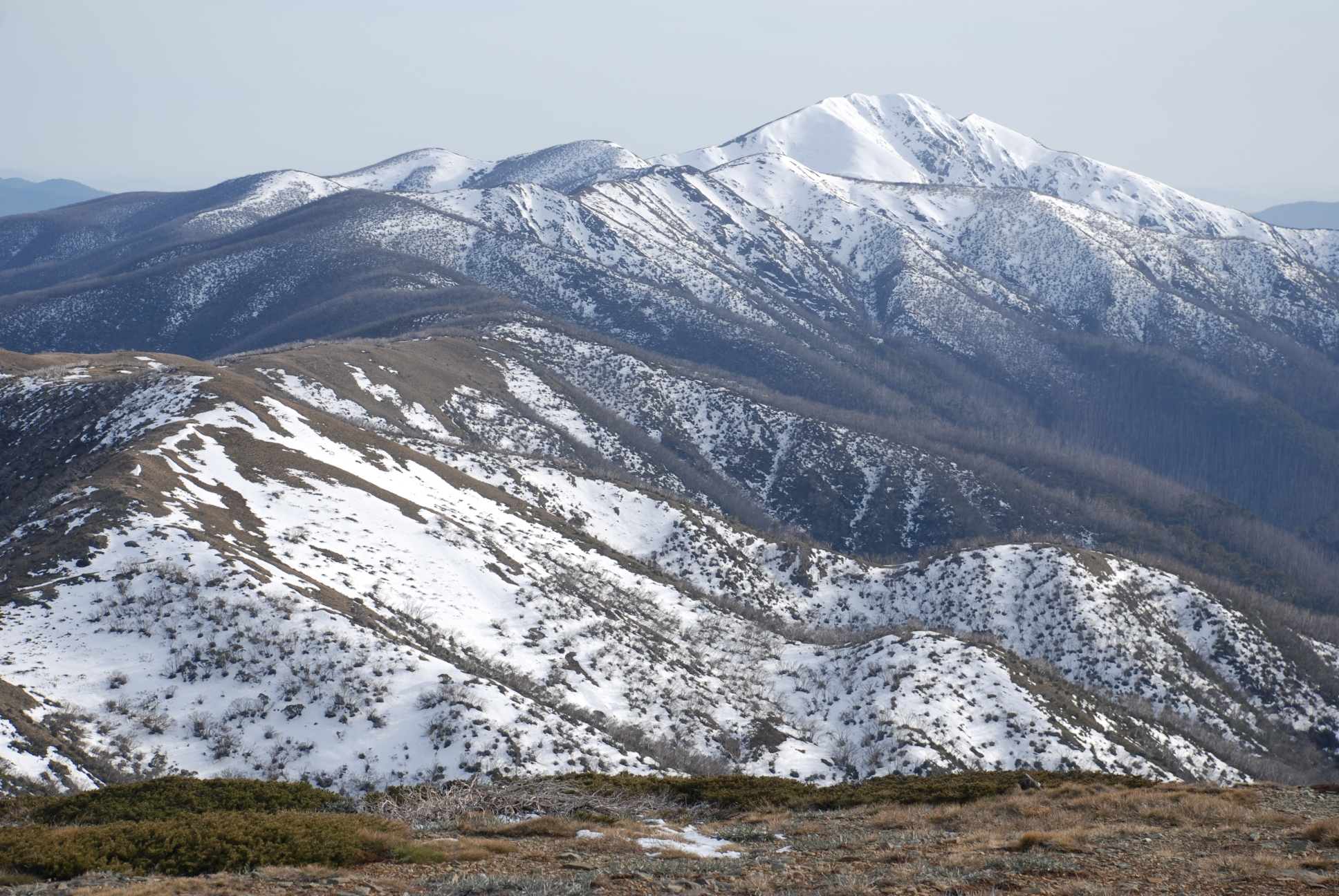
Alpine National Park, Victoria: Mount Feathertop and Razorback, spring 2007.

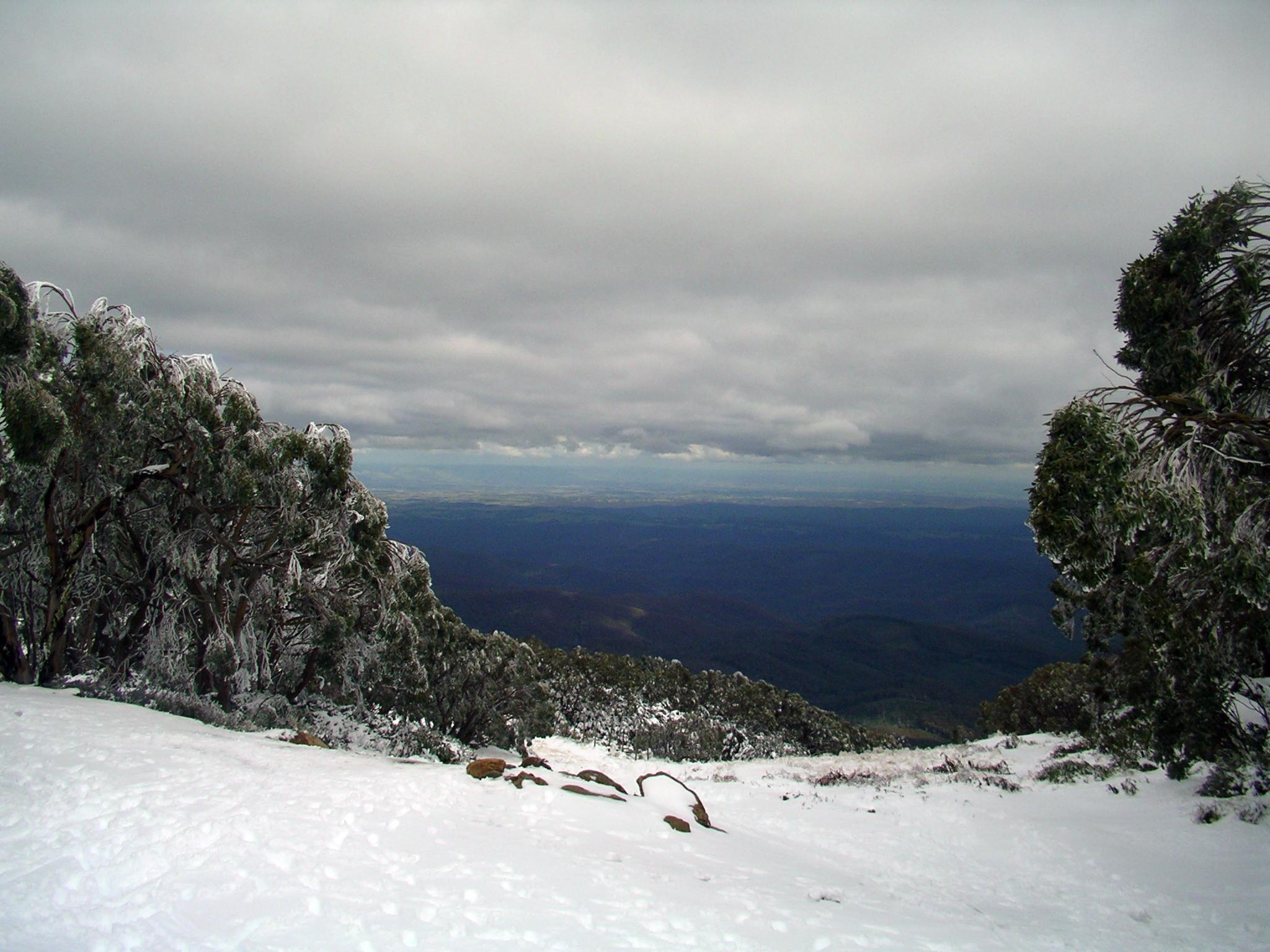
Baw Baw National Park, Victoria: Looking east across Gippsland from Mt Baw Baw, autumn 2006.

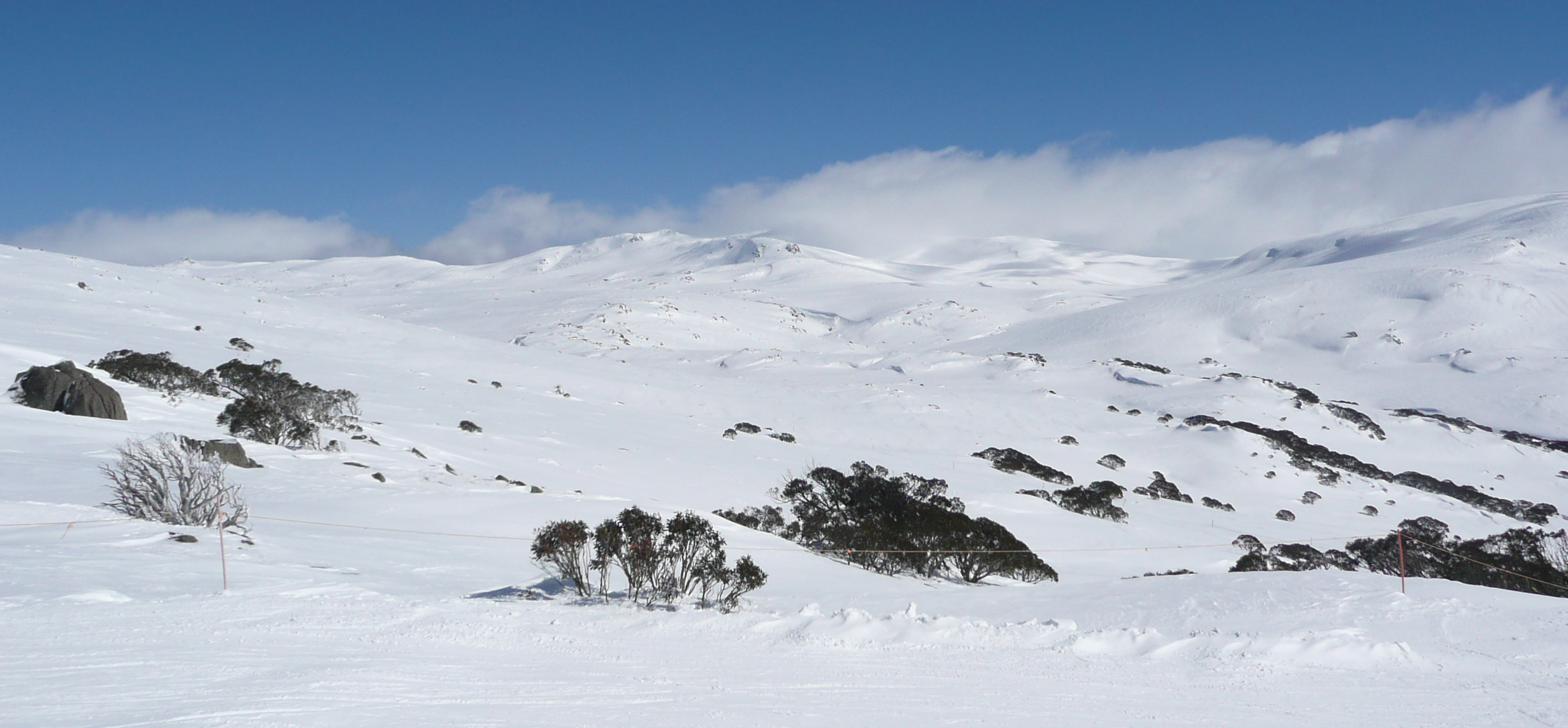
Kosciuszko National Park, New South Wales: View towards Mount Kosciuszko, winter 2008.

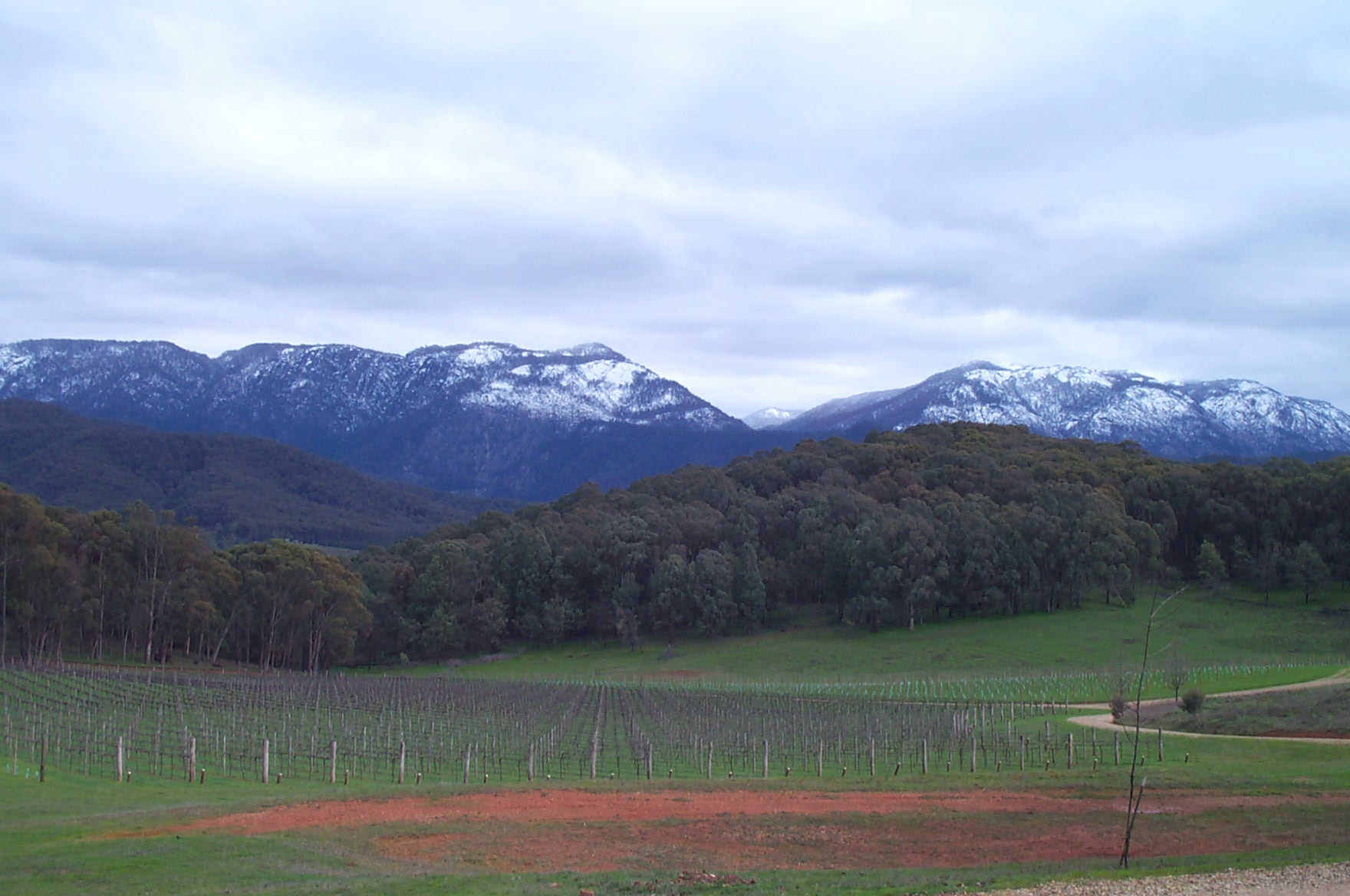
Mount Buffalo National Park, Victoria: View from Porepunkah towards Mt Buffalo, winter 2003.

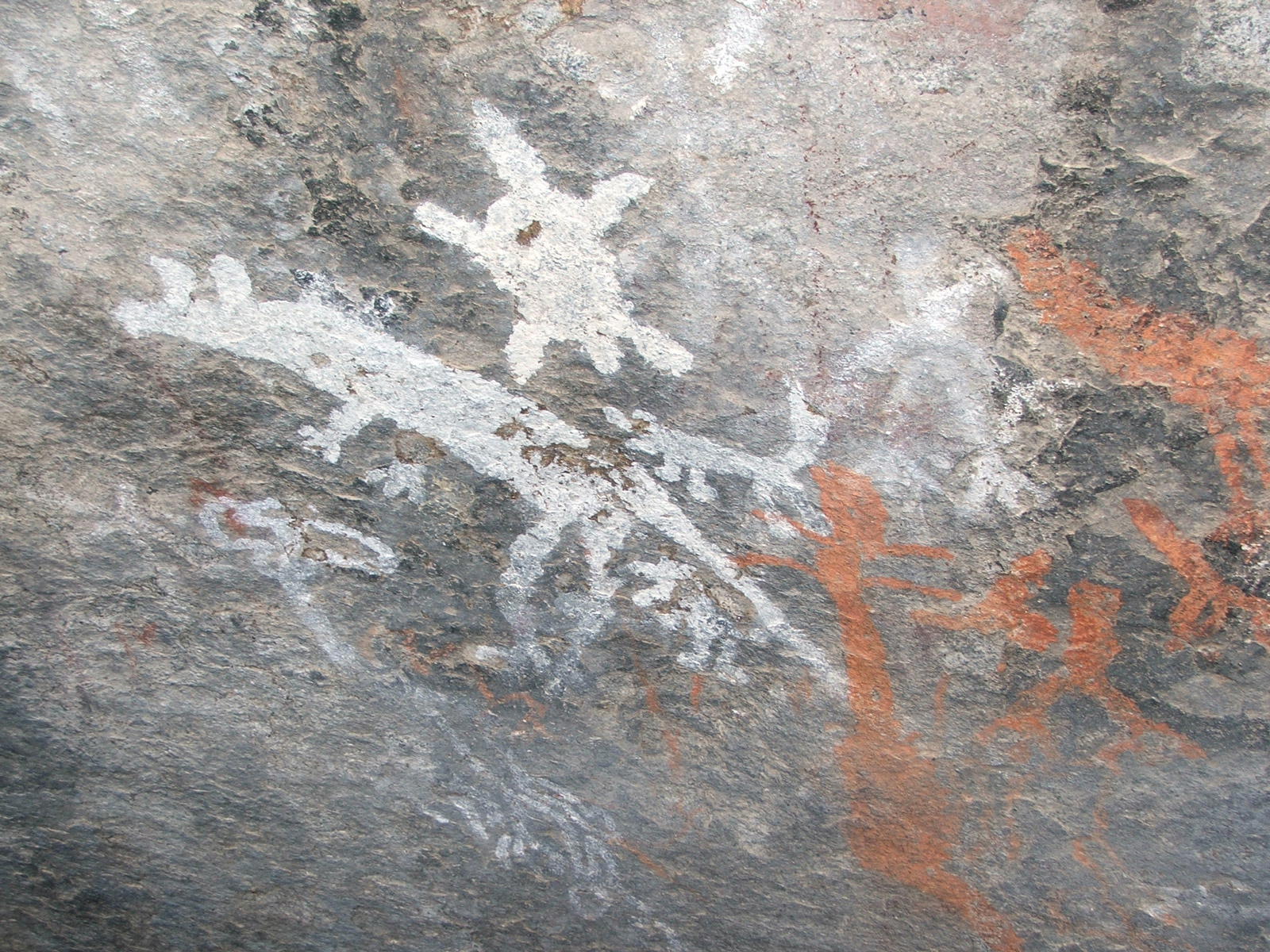
Namadgi National Park, Australian Capital Territory: Yankee Hat aboriginal artwork.

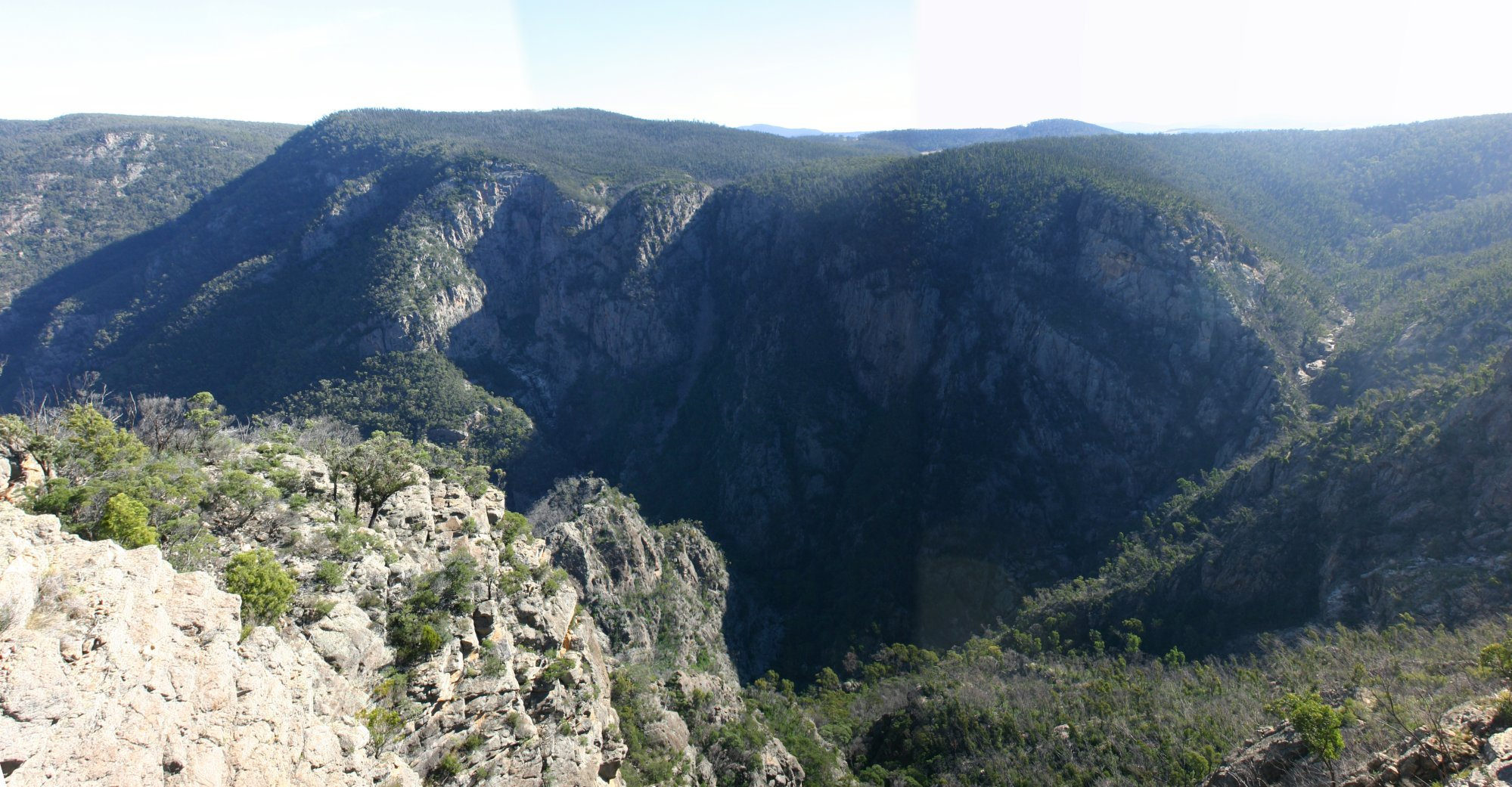
Snowy River National Park, Victoria: Little River Gorge, autumn 2005.

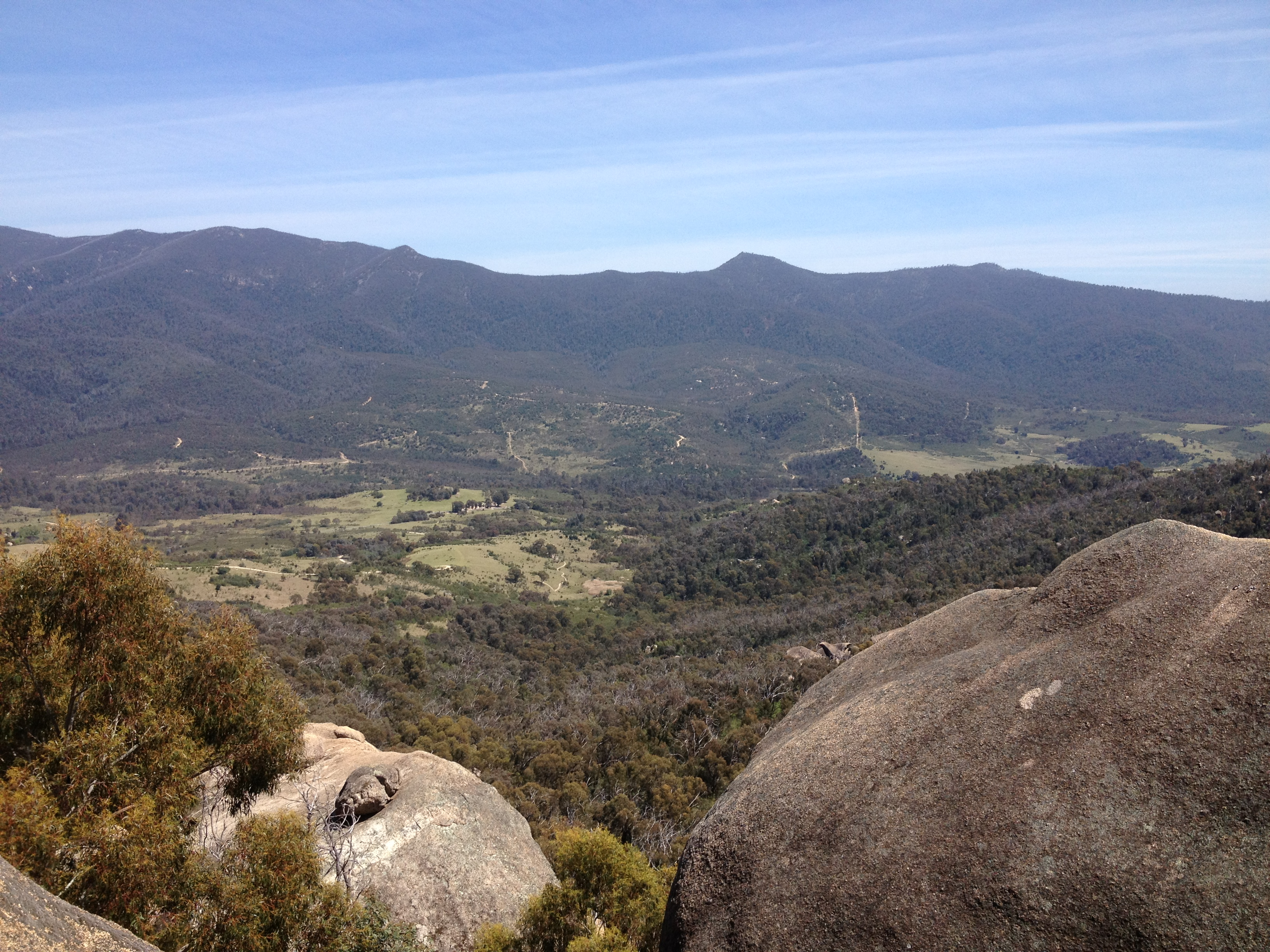
Tidbinbilla Nature Reserve, Australian Capital Territory: Looking northwest from the summit of Gibraltar Peak, 2012.

== See also ==
- Australian Alps
- List of Australian Capital Territory protected areas
- Protected areas of New South Wales
- Protected areas of Victoria
