= Snowy 2.0 Pumped Storage Power Station =

Pumped-hydro battery in New South Wales, Australia

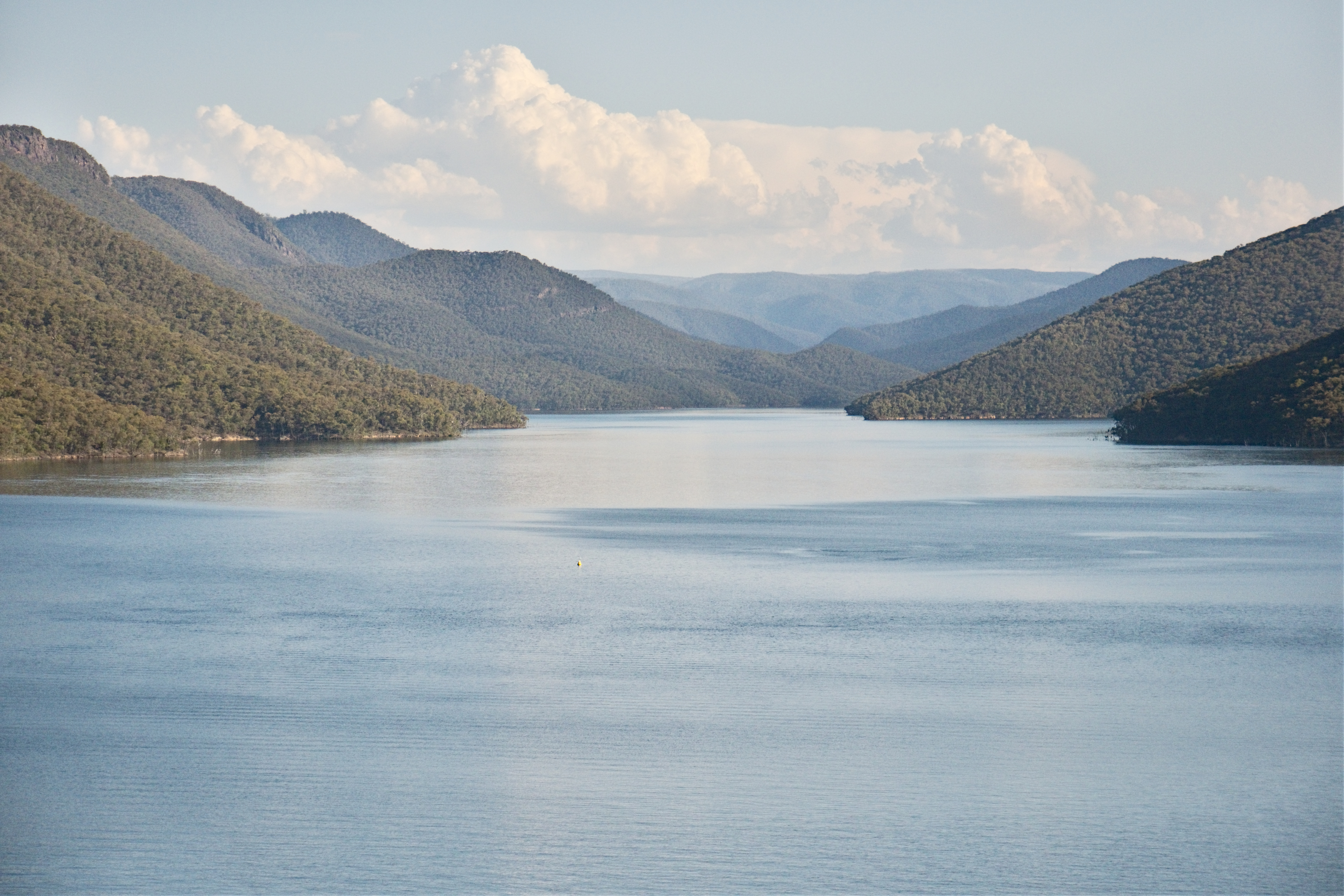
- Country: Australia
- Location: Snowy Mountains
- Coordinates: 35°47′11″S 148°26′40″E
- Status: Under construction
- Construction began: 2019; 7 years ago
- Construction cost: AUD 12 billion
- Owner: Snowy Hydro
- Operator: Snowy Hydro

Power generation
- Nameplate capacity: 2,000 MW

External links
- Website: https://www.snowyhydro.com.au/

Snowy 2.0 Pumped Storage Power Station (Snowy Hydro 2.0 or simply Snowy 2.0) is a pumped-hydro battery megaproject in New South Wales, Australia. The dispatchable generation project expands upon the original Snowy Mountains Scheme (ex post facto Snowy 1.0) connecting two existing dams through a 27-kilometre (17 mi) underground tunnel and a new, underground pumped-hydro power station. The project is led by public company Snowy Hydro Limited. Snowy 2.0 is expected to last for at least 100 years, and supply 2.2 gigawatts of capacity and about 350 gigawatt-hours of large-scale storage to the national electricity market. It is the largest renewable energy project under construction in Australia. It includes one of the largest and deepest cavern excavations ever undertaken. It also includes the longest tunnels (at 27 kilometres (17 mi)) of any pumped-hydro station ever built.

It is designed for grid stabilization, to be a backup at times of peak demand, and overnight, and during a wet and windless day or week, for when solar and wind energy are not providing sufficient power. It provides valuable firming capability. Snowy Hydro acts like a giant battery by absorbing, storing, and dispatching energy. Snowy 2.0 can be "switched on" very quickly. The battery is designed to operate for up to 175 hours of temporary supply. Snowy 2.0 is directly connected to the rest of the Snowy Mountains Hydroelectric system via rivers and tunnels, including the large storage at Lake Eucumbene, which provides large operational flexibility to meet both generation and irrigation requirements. It is Australia's largest energy project, estimated to cost 12 billion Australian dollars and projected to generate 10% of the nation's energy.

The Australian grid will need 500-2000 GWh of storage by 2050 depending on many uncertain variables. Construction began in 2019. By 2023, AU$4.3 billion had been spent. When complete, it is expected to have a large impact on the price and reliability of electric power.

== History ==
Initial plans for a power station at the location were discussed in 1966. Further studies were undertaken in 1980 and 1990. The current project originated as the centrepiece of Malcolm Turnbull's climate change policy in 2017. The original rough cost of the project was around $2 billion. A feasibility study carried out in 2017 finding the project was both technically and financially feasible. The study was released on 21 December 2017 and found the project cost would be between $3.8 and 4.5 billion.

The first tunnel, completed by October 2022, was a 2.85-kilometre section that provided main access at Lobs Hole. It was 10 metres in diameter and provides pedestrian and vehicle access into the power station. By May 2023 the emergency, cable and ventilation tunnel was excavated. It is 2.93 kilometres long, 10 metres in diameter, and will be used for power station ventilation and high-voltage cables. Excavation of the transformer and machines halls began in June 2023. By February 2024, half of the construction required was complete.

It was originally expected to be completed by 2024. Snowy Hydro 2.0 has been beset by delays and cost blowouts. Delays have been caused by the COVID-19 pandemic, global supply chain disruptions, complex design elements and variable site and geological conditions. The delays have raised concerns that Snowy Hydro will not be ready in time for new solar and wind projects coming online as five coal-fired power stations close. The project is currently expected to be fully operational by the end of 2028.

The project is using three tunnel boring machines to dig tunnels. One of the machines, called Florence, was stuck for 19 months after encountering soft rock near Tantangara. Florence is excavating the 16-kilometre headrace tunnel, which will connect the underground power station to the upper Tantangara reservoir. Florence launched in March 2022 and was named in honour of Australia's first female electrical engineer, Florence Violet McKenzie. Eight weeks later the machine was bogged in wet, soft ground. The machine is capable of digging 30 to 50 metres a day. In December 2022, a sinkhole opened up above the tunnel. Florence was moving at a pace of six metres a day by early December 2023. In May 2024, the tunnel boring machine was stuck in hard rock. A complex fault zone caused the delay. By 11 July Florence was clear of the hard rock after using ultra-high-pressure water jetting. A fourth boring machine was required due to the delays caused by Florence.

Drilling and blasting was used to dig caverns. The company managing underground blasting operations was Orica. Rock bolts and shotcrete support the exposed solid rock face. The main cavern was excavated between June 2023 and January 2024. In early 2025, tunnelling work was halted due to safety concerns.

In October 2025, the scheme was reported to be 67% complete but it could not be completed within the A$12 billion forecast cost.

== Design and location ==
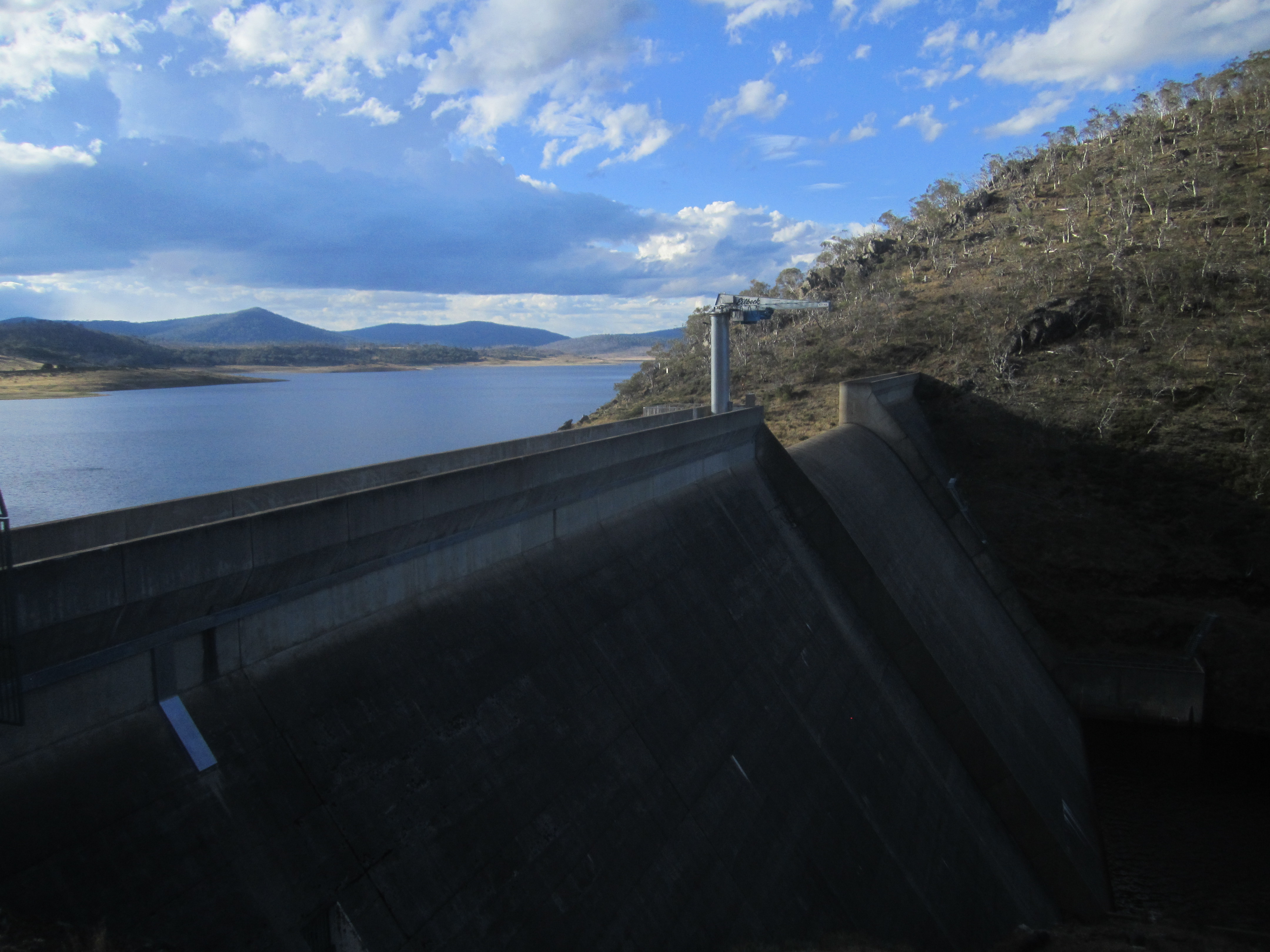
Tantangara Reservoir, 2013

It is located remotely within the Kosciuszko National Park in the Snowy Mountains. Snowy Hydro 2.0 will use water from the Talbingo Reservoir (bottom storage) and Tantangara Reservoir (top storage). The dams have a height differential of 700 metres. The new power station is being built by the Italian firm Webuild. It will be located in a cavern 800 metres underground. The underground location allows for reduced environmental impacts within the national park. The operational footprint of the facility is less than 0.01% of the total size of the park.

The Inclined Pressure Shaft (IPS) through which the water will pass is the largest of its kind in the world and facilitates the water's return to the upper reservoir when the pump-turbines operate in reverse. The IPS is 10 metres in diameter, 1.6 kilometres long, and at a 25-degree incline. Pre-cast concrete segments for the shaft are produced at a factory in the town of Cooma. Fatigue resistance is a key design element in the IPS.

The power station will measure 22 metres wide, 50 m high, and 250 m long. The station will house six reversible Francis pump-turbine and motor-generator units. Three units will be of variable speed with the remaining of synchronous speed. Each turbine will have a rated output of 333 megawatts. Power generating equipment is being supplied by Voith.

It will be connected to the grid via the HumeLink transmission line. The construction of overhead power lines by TransGrid has been opposed by community advocacy groups. Landholders' desires to see the transmission line built underground have been opposed due to prohibitive costs.

== See also ==
- List of megaprojects
- List of pumped-storage hydroelectric power stations
- List of power stations in New South Wales
- Renewable energy in Australia
