= Currango Homestead =

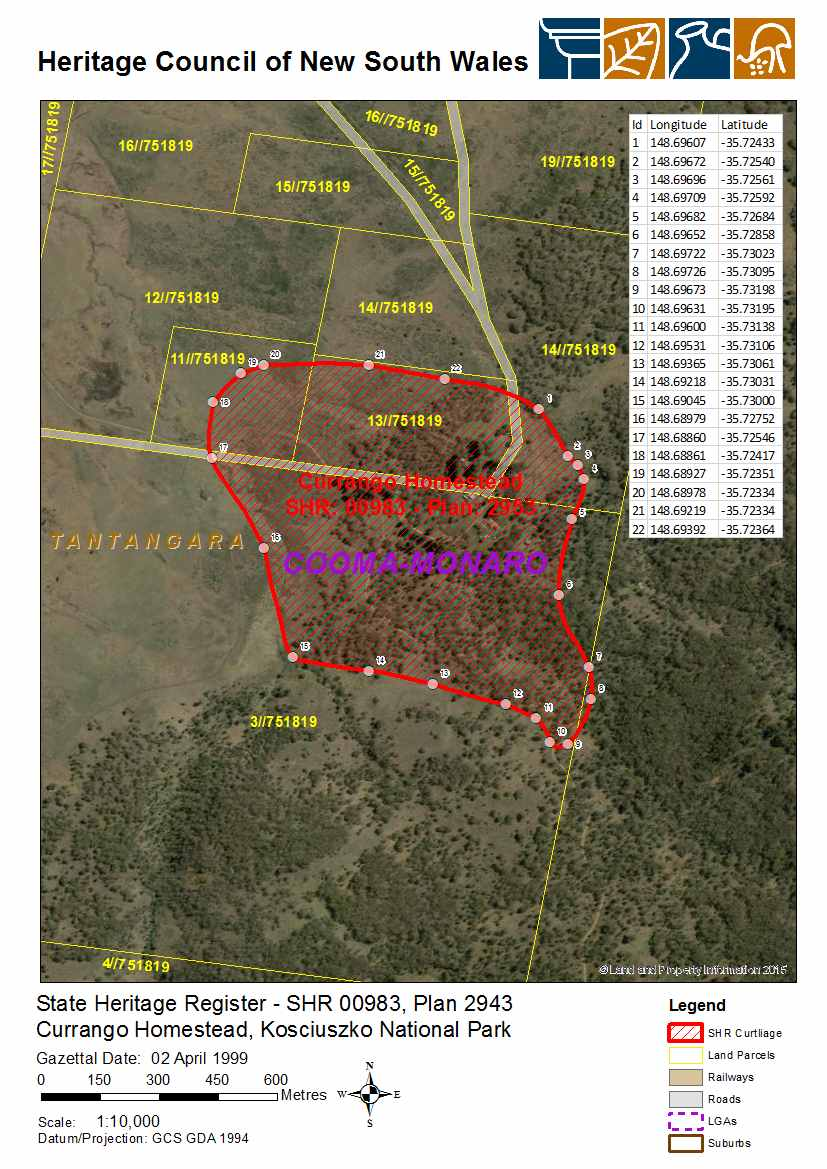
- Heritage boundaries

- Location within New South Wales Location within Australia
- 35.7267°S 148.6929°E
- Location: Kosciuszko National Park, Snowy Monaro Regional Council, New South Wales, Australia

Site notes
- Owner: Office of Environment and Heritage

New South Wales Heritage Register
- Official name: Currango Homestead
- Type: state heritage (built)
- Designated: 2 April 1999
- Reference no.: 983
- Type: Homestead building
- Category: Residential buildings (private)

Currango Homestead is a heritage-listed farm and homestead at Tantangara in the Kosciuszko National Park in New South Wales, Australia. The property is owned by the Office of Environment and Heritage. It was added to the New South Wales State Heritage Register on 2 April 1999.

== History ==
Originally part of the Currango (formerly Currangorambla) pastoral station, Currango Homestead was built in 1895 by Arthur Triggs.

It became part of the then-Kosciusko State Park in 1944, but remained occupied.

It is now lived in by caretakers who rent out the property as tourist accommodation.

== Description ==
The cultural landscape of Currango is significant as an aesthetically pleasing combination of low key weatherboard accommodation buildings and vernacular drop log and slab outbuildings set among exotic plantings, creating a landmark within a broader natural landscape where the Port Phillip pines stand out as a beacon for travellers. The cultural plantings in the Currango area are an integral part of the heritage value of the place, providing a demonstration of landscape management, self-sufficiency and use of an established pastoral property in the Koscziusko Mountains. The cultural landscape as a whole is of greater value than its individual built or planted elements.

A mature specimen of a Himalayan or blue pine (Pinus wallichiana) with its long curved cones forms part of Currango's plantings.

== Heritage listing ==
The Currango Historic Precinct is a place of state heritage significance. The establishment of the Currango pastoral station in the late 1830s is part of the story of the rapid spread of Australian settlement based on pastoral expansion.

Currango demonstrates better than any other snow belt property, the pattern of European occupation and subsequent development of summer relief pastoralism and seasonal human presence that characterised the region. It is the largest and most intact homestead complex of the 11 snow belt stations and is the only one that has been almost continuously seasonally occupied since the 1830s. Its story demonstrates an early recognition of a need for summer grazing and drought relief strategies and is associated with the romanticised tradition of exceptionally hardy stockmen and horses. It demonstrates the displacement of local Aboriginals and the disruption of their use of their mountain pathway network.

Currango is a rare place in the mountains that has become a symbol within the region for mountain hardiness and past living conditions. It stimulates unusually high levels of attachment among people associated with the place and in 1975 the early fishermen, and holiday makers demonstrated their commitment to the place when they spontaneously formed a group that still operates as the Friends of Currango to support its continued operation.

Currango has strong associations with early pastoralists who were significant in developing the region, most notably Thomas O'Rourke and Arthur Triggs and it was a critical component of the Australian Estate Mortgage Company's chain of properties, drought relief strategy. The Taylor family (Tom & Molly, Ted & Helen) are well known throughout the region as its most significant caretakers, who have perpetuated and enhanced the longstanding tradition of lively and active mountain hospitality and stories associated with Currango.

The cultural landscape of Currango is significant as an aesthetically pleasing combination of low key weatherboard accommodation buildings and vernacular drop log and slab outbuildings set among exotic plantings, creating a landmark within a broader natural landscape where the Port Phillip pines (Pinus radiata) stand out as a beacon for travellers. The cultural plantings in the Currango area are an integral part of the heritage value of the place, providing a demonstration of landscape management, self-sufficiency and use of an established pastoral property in the Koscziusko Mountains. The cultural landscape as a whole is of greater value than its individual built or planted elements.

The subsurface archaeological deposits associated with European occupation have potential to contribute to our greater understanding of the site. The Aboriginal heritage of the area comprises a suite of Aboriginal sites which demonstrate the evolving pattern of Aboriginal cultural history and have the potential to yield information about local and regional adaptive strategies. The quality, extent and diversity of the prehistoric archaeological remains in this place are not well understood at present. The sites have high research value at the local level and moderate value at the regional level. The sites are significant to the local Walgalu and Wiradjuri Aboriginal communities as a demonstration of their past presence in the high plains and the Currango Historic Precinct has an ongoing association with local Aboriginal people

Currango Homestead was listed on the New South Wales State Heritage Register on 2 April 1999.
