= Tantangara =

- Town
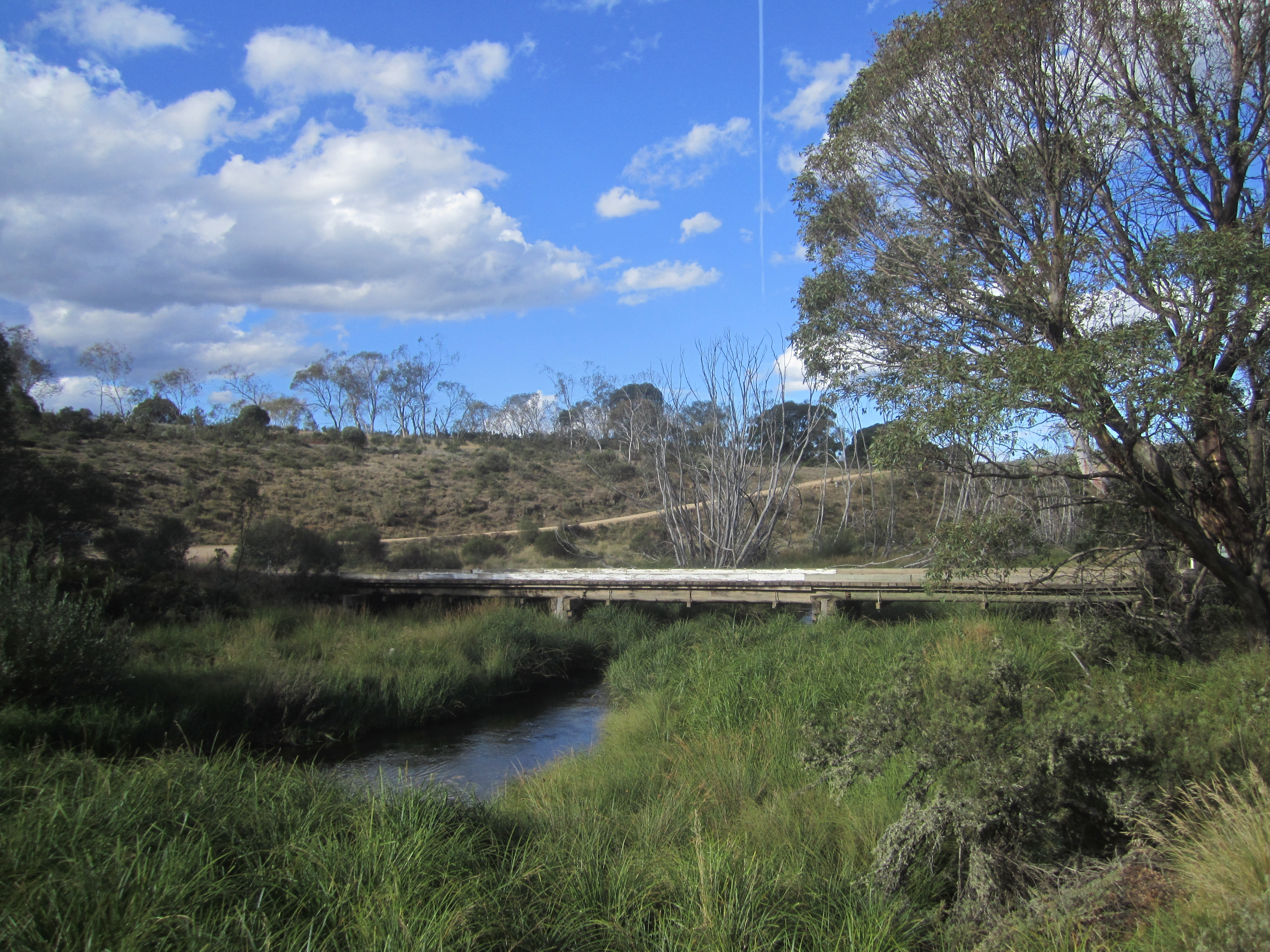
- Murrumbidgee River at Tantangara

- Coordinates: 35°43′S 148°40′E
- Country: Australia
- State: New South Wales
- Region: Monaro
- LGA: Snowy Monaro Regional Council
- Location: 42 km (26 mi) NW of Adaminaby; 210 km (130 mi) SW of Canberra; 95 km (59 mi) NW of Cooma

Government
  - State electorate: Monaro
  - Federal division: Eden-Monaro

Population
  - Total: 0 (2016 census)
- Postcode: 2629
- County: Wallace
- Parish: Tantangara
Localities around Tantangara
Long Plain	Cooleman	Cooleman
Gooandra	Tantangara	Yaouk
Gooandra	Gooandra	Nungar

Tantangara is a locality in the Snowy Monaro Regional Council region of New South Wales, Australia. At the 2016 census, Tantangara had a population of zero. It is the location of the Tantangara Dam on the Murrumbidgee River, part of the Snowy Mountains Scheme.

Today, the entire locality is contained in the Kosciuszko National Park. The Port Phillip Trail and Dam Trail pass through Tantangara.

== Heritage listings ==
Tantangara has a number of heritage-listed sites, including:

- Currango Homestead
