= Gibraltar Peak (Canberra) =

Mountain in the Australian Capital Territory

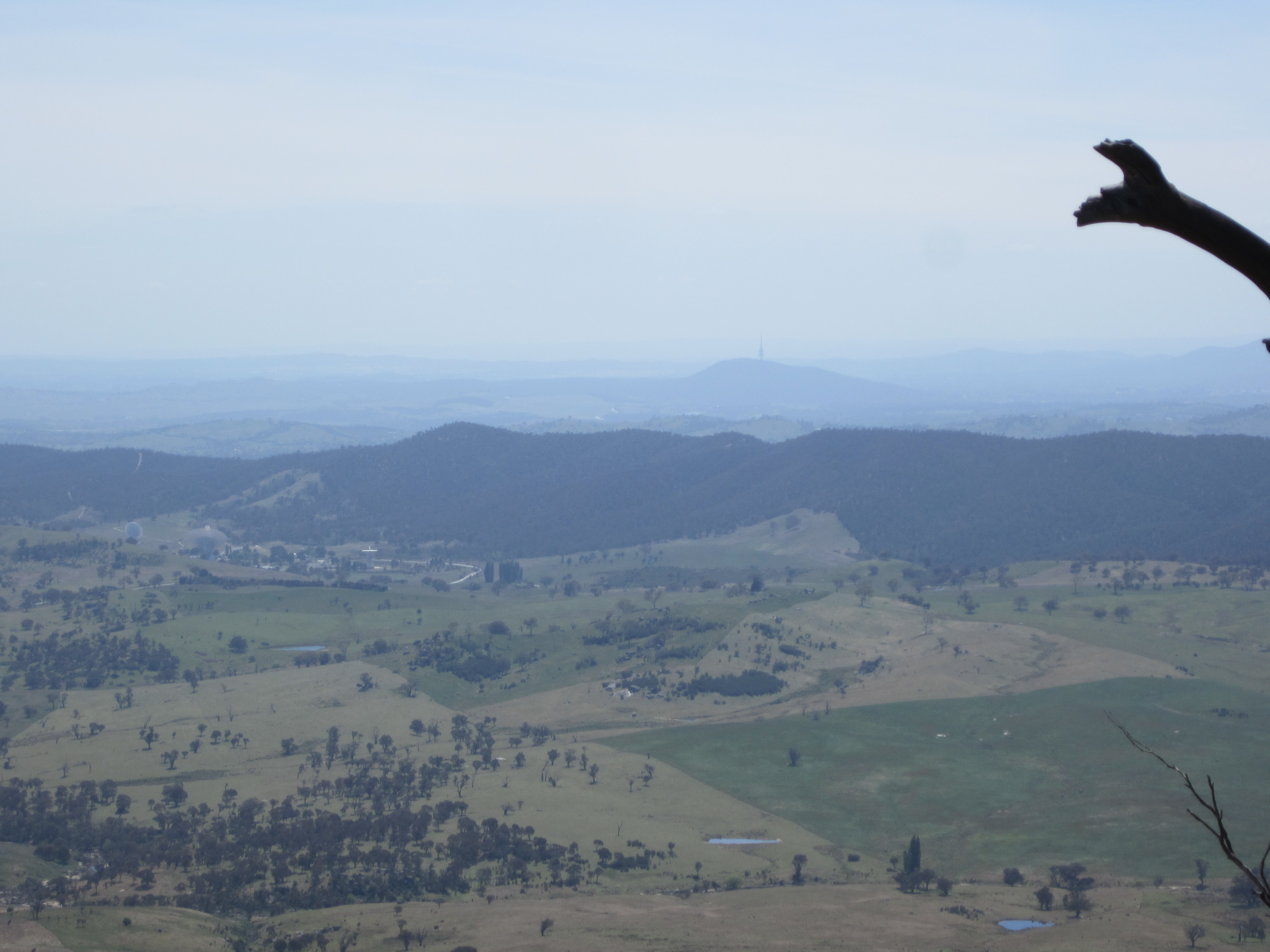
- Looking towards Canberra from Gibraltar Peak.

Highest point
- Elevation: 1,038 m (3,406 ft)
- Coordinates: 35°27.558′S 148°56.92′E

Geography
- Location within Australian Capital Territory
- Location: Australian Capital Territory, Australia

Climbing
- Easiest route: Hike via the Gibraltar Peak Track from Dalsetta car park

Gibraltar Peak is a mountain with an elevation of 1,038 metres (3,406 feet) AHD that is located within the Tidbinbilla Nature Reserve, approximately 26.4 kilometres (16.4 miles) from Canberra, in the Australian Capital Territory. Gibraltar Peak is the 45th highest mountain in the Australian Capital Territory. There are two tracks leading up to the summit of the mountain, the longer being 13 kilometres (8.1 mi) and the shorter being 8 kilometres (5.0 mi).

== Location and features ==
Canberra is the closest city to Gibraltar Peak at approximately 26.4 kilometres (16.4 mi) away. The nearest point of road access to the summit is an unsealed road 170 metres (560 ft) from the summit. The closest sealed road to the summit is the Corin Dam Road, which is about 1.5 kilometres (0.93 mi) away from the peak. The peak is located inside the Tidbinbilla Nature Reserve.

Gibraltar Peak is located 1,038 metres (3,406 ft) AHD and is the 45th tallest mountain in the Australian Capital Territory.

=== Vegetation and wildlife ===
Eastern grey kangaroos live on the peak.

== Hiking routes and activity ==
There are two tracks leading up to the summit of Gibraltar Peak, one is an 8-kilometre (5.0 mi) return walk from the Dalsetta car park; the other is 13-kilometre (8.1 mi) return journey via the Birrigai Time Trail and the visitor centre. The track leading up to the peak was created by Makin Trax, that won an award for its work in 2012. Within two weeks of the new track being opened in May 2012, over 400 people had used it. A viewing platform was built near the mountain.

Organised bushwalks have been done at the peak.

People have illegally dumped garbage near the peak. During the 1970s, Australian climbers including Bryden Allen, Joe Friend, John Fantini and Keith Bell were climbing Gibraltar Peak and other mountains in the area. During the 1980s, Antipodean Atrocities was created at the peak as a climbing route up the mountain.
