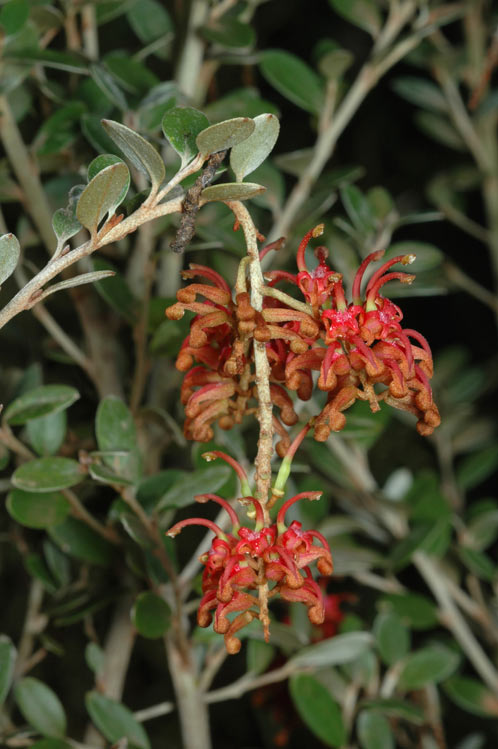
- In the Australian National Botanic Gardens

Conservation status
- Near Threatened (IUCN 3.1)

Scientific classification
- Kingdom: Plantae
- Clade: Tracheophytes
- Clade: Angiosperms
- Clade: Eudicots
- Order: Proteales
- Family: Proteaceae
- Genus: Grevillea
- Species: G. diminuta

Binomial name
- Grevillea diminuta L.A.S.Johnson

= Grevillea diminuta =

Species of flowering plant

Grevillea diminuta is a species of flowering plant in the family Proteaceae and is endemic to eastern Australia. It is a small, spreading shrub with elliptic to egg-shaped leaves and cylindrical to dome-shaped groups of reddish-brown flowers.

== Description ==
Grevillea diminuta is a spreading shrub that typically grows to a height of 0.3–1 m (1 ft 0 in – 3 ft 3 in). Its leaves are elliptic to egg-shaped, 6–20 mm (0.24–0.79 in) long and 3–9 mm (0.12–0.35 in) wide, the lower surface silky-hairy. The flowers are arranged in down-turned cylindrical to dome-shaped groups 20–60 mm (0.79–2.36 in) long and are reddish-brown and bright red inside, the pistil 10–11 mm (0.39–0.43 in) long. Flowering mainly occurs from September to December and the fruit is an elliptic, finely wrinkled follicle 10–15 mm (0.39–0.59 in) long.

== Taxonomy ==
Grevillea diminuta was first formally described in 1962 by Lawrie Johnson in Contributions from the New South Wales Herbarium from specimens collected by Ruurd Dirk Hoogland near Mount Franklin. The specific epithet (diminuta) means "diminished".

== Distribution and habitat ==
This grevillea grows on rocky slopes in subalpine woodland on the Brindabella and Bimberi Ranges in the Australian Capital Territory and on the border with New South Wales.

== Conservation status ==
Grevillea diminuta has been listed as Near Threatened on the IUCN Red List of Threatened Species. It has a severely restricted distribution with an estimated extent of occurrence of 655 km^{2} (253 sq mi) and an estimated area of occupancy of 132 km^{2} (51 sq mi). The species is likely threatened by inappropriate fire regimes and land clearing for road development within parts of its distribution. Despite these threats, the population of this species currently appears to be stable, and no conservation measures are required.
