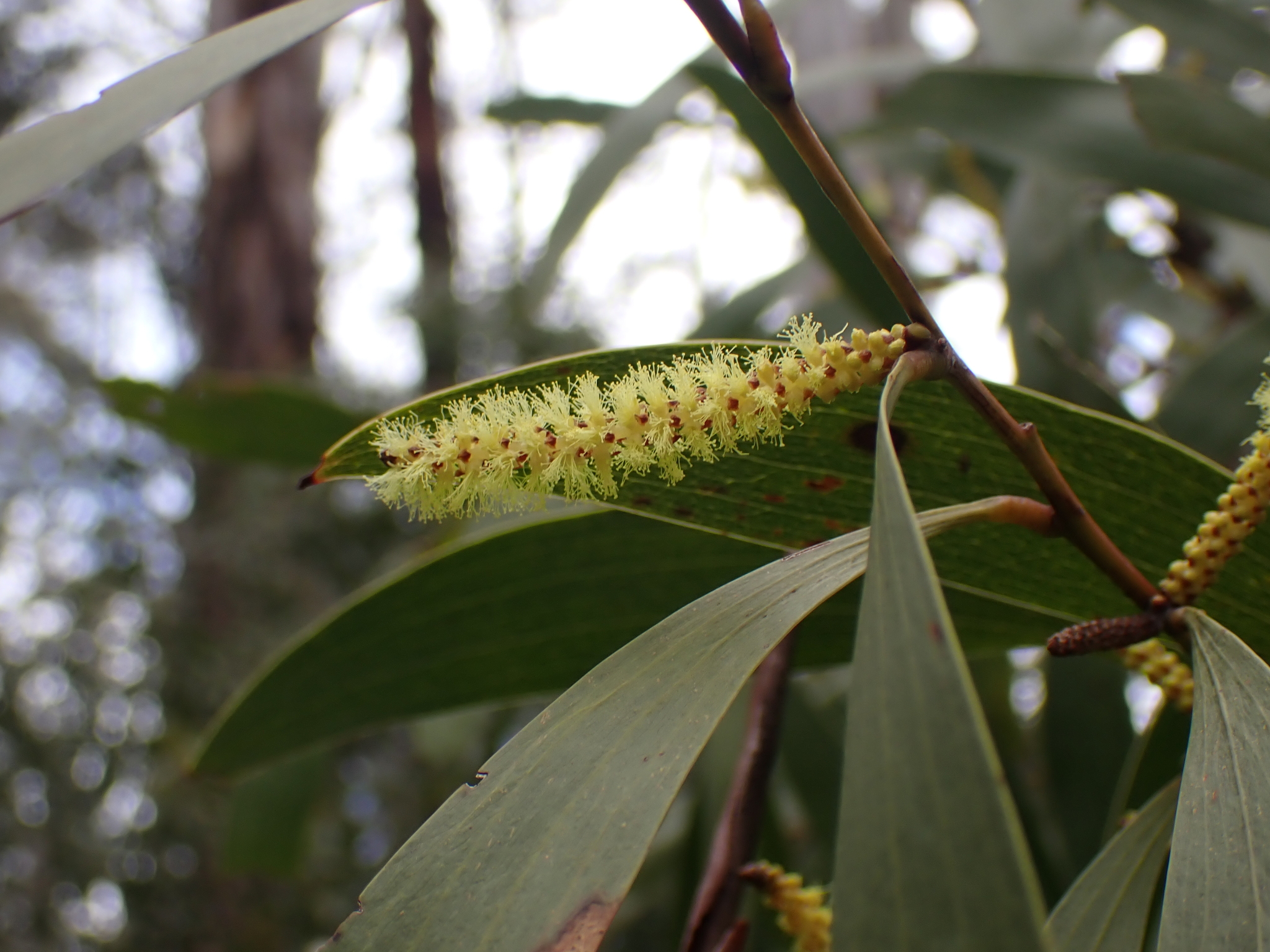

Conservation status
- Vulnerable (IUCN 3.1)

Scientific classification
- Kingdom: Plantae
- Clade: Tracheophytes
- Clade: Angiosperms
- Clade: Eudicots
- Clade: Rosids
- Order: Fabales
- Family: Fabaceae
- Subfamily: Caesalpinioideae
- Clade: Mimosoid clade
- Genus: Acacia
- Species: A. dallachiana

Binomial name
- Acacia dallachiana F.Muell.
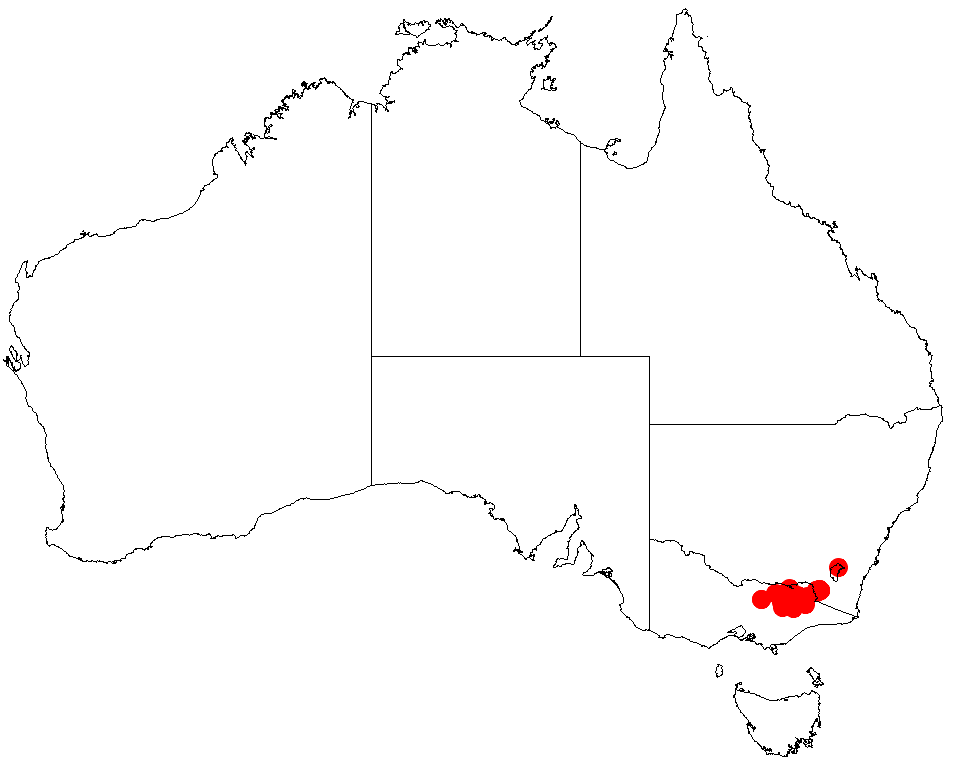
- Occurrence data from AVH

Synonyms
- Racosperma dallachianum (F.Muell.) Pedley

= Acacia dallachiana =

Catkin wattle

Species of legume

Acacia dallachiana, commonly known as catkin wattle is a species of flowering plant in the family Fabaceae and is endemic to higher altitudes near the New South Wales-Victoria border in south-eastern Australia. It is an erect or spreading shrub or tree with narrowly lance-shaped to narrowly elliptic phyllodes, spikes of mid to deep yellow flowers and pods resembling a string of beads.

== Description ==
Acacia dallachiana is an erect or spreading shrub or tree that typically grows up to 15 m (49 ft) high and has smooth grey or greyish brown bark and glabrous branchlets. Its phyllodes are narrowly lance-shaped or narrowly elliptic, often with one side straight and the other convex, 80–180 mm (3.1–7.1 in) long and 10–35 mm (0.39–1.38 in) wide with a small gland 3–6 mm (0.12–0.24 in) above the base of the phyllode. The flowers are borne in usually two spikes up to 60 mm (2.4 in) long and often curved, with densely arranged, mid to deep yellow flowers. Flowering usually occurs between September and December, and the pods are mostly straight, about 60–150 mm (2.4–5.9 in) long and 2–5 mm (0.079–0.197 in) wide and thinly leathery to papery. The seeds are elliptic, about 4 mm (0.16 in) long with a cup-shaped aril.

== Taxonomy ==
Acacia dallachiana was first formally described in 1859 by Ferdinand von Mueller in his Fragmenta Phytographiae Australiae from specimens collected on Mount Buffalo by John Dallachy. The specific epithet honours Dallachy, who was once the curator of the Royal Botanic Gardens in Melbourne.

== Distribution ==
Catkin wattle is endemic to the New South Wales-Victoria border, and is found in the Victorian Alps and highlands with the bulk of the population confined to the montane and subalpine forests on the Buffalo Range and at Sassafras Gap. It extends into the far south east of New South Wales in the Snowy Mountains at higher altitudes where it is found growing in granitic soils in wet sclerophyll forest and woodlands.

== Conservation status ==
Acacia dallachiana is listed as "vulnerable" under the Victorian Government Flora and Fauna Guarantee Act 1988 and the IUCN Red List.

== See also ==
- List of Acacia species
