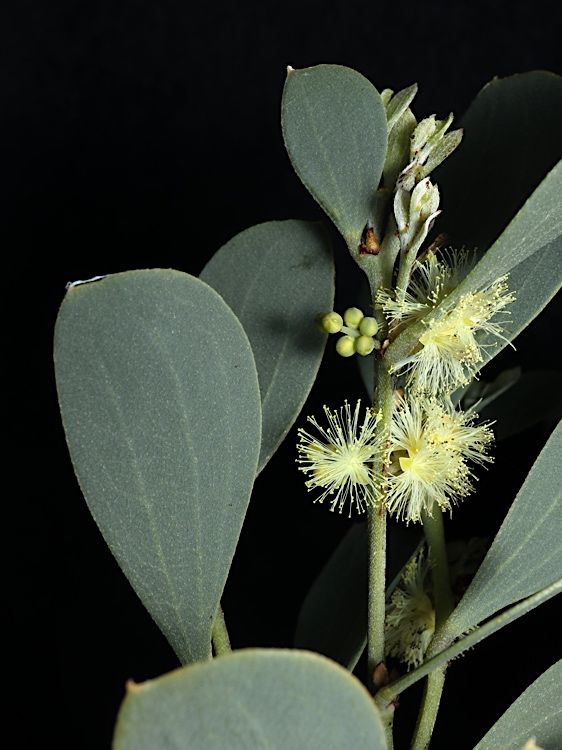
- In the Australian National Botanic Gardens
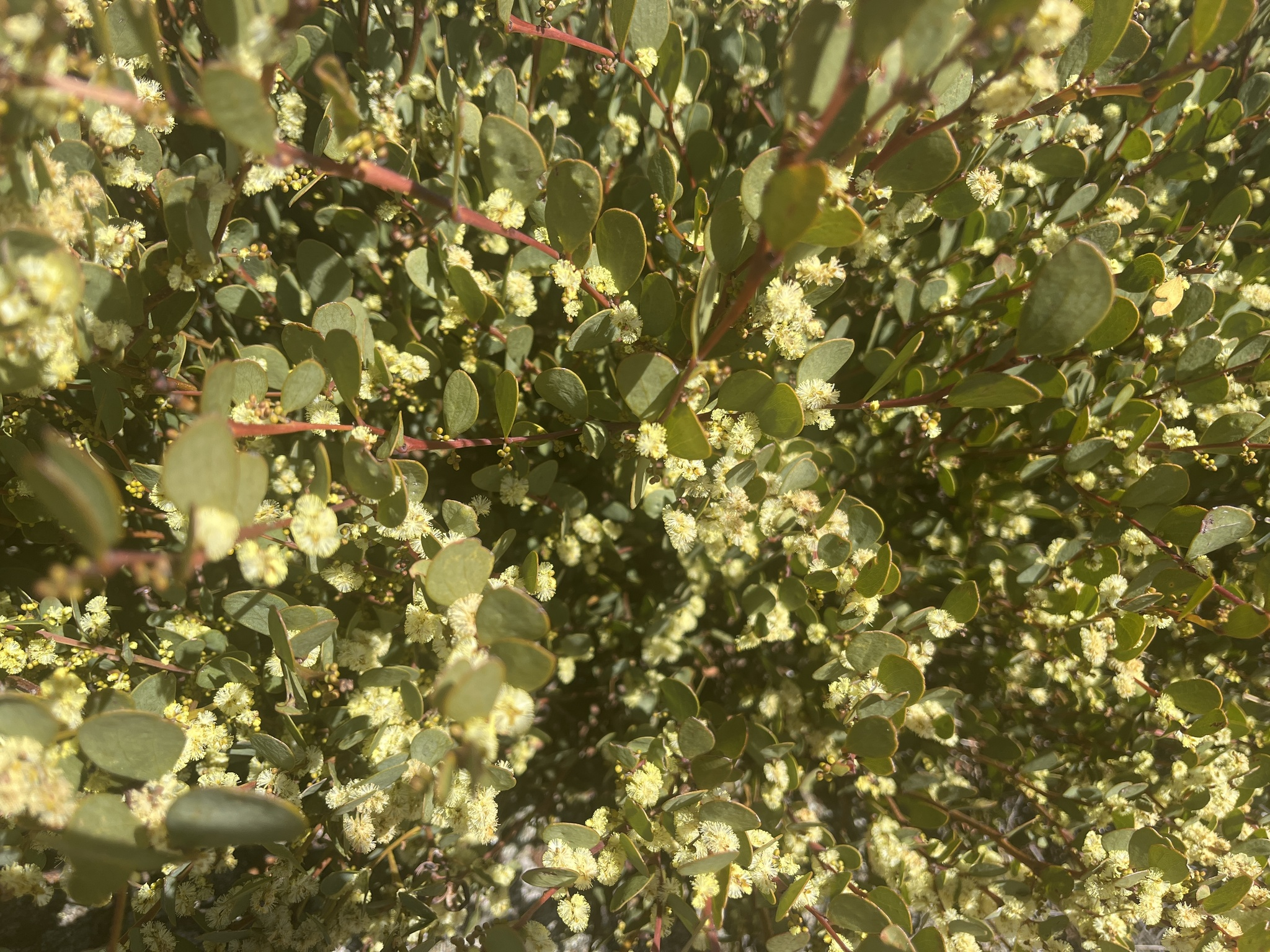

Conservation status
- Least Concern (IUCN 3.1)

Scientific classification
- Kingdom: Plantae
- Clade: Tracheophytes
- Clade: Angiosperms
- Clade: Eudicots
- Clade: Rosids
- Order: Fabales
- Family: Fabaceae
- Subfamily: Caesalpinioideae
- Clade: Mimosoid clade
- Genus: Acacia
- Species: A. alpina

Binomial name
- Acacia alpina F.Muell.
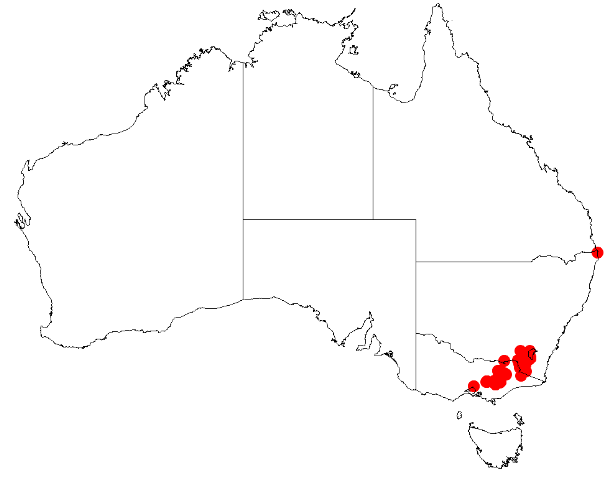
- Occurrence data from AVH

Synonyms
- Acacia longifolia var. alpina F.Muell. nom. inval.; Racosperma alpinum (F.Muell.) Pedley

= Acacia alpina =

Alpine wattle

Species of legume

Acacia alpina, commonly known as alpine wattle is a species of flowering plant in the family Fabaceae and is endemic to alpine and subalpine regions of south-eastern continental Australia. It is an erect or spreading shrub or tree with egg-shaped or broadly egg-shaped phyllodes with the narrower end towards the base, flowers arranged in 1 or 2 racemes in the axils of phyllodes, each with cylindrical to oblong, usually pale yellow flowers, and thin-walled, gently curved or coiled pods 30–80 mm (1.2–3.1 in) long.

== Description ==
Acacia alpina is an erect or spreading, tangled shrub that typically grows to 1–2 m (3 ft 3 in – 6 ft 7 in) high and up to 10 m (33 ft) wide. The phyllodes are egg-shaped, broadly egg-shaped or more or less round and asymmetrical, 15–35 mm (0.59–1.38 in) long and 8–25 mm (0.31–0.98 in) wide. There is a D-shaped stipule at the base of the phyllode, but that falls off as the phyllode develops. The phyllodes are thick and coriaceous, common with alpine and subalpine shrubs.

=== Flowers and fruits ===
The flowers are usually pale yellow, borne in 1 or 2 cylindrical to oblong spikes 5–15 mm (0.20–0.59 in) long in the axils of phyllodes, each spike with few flowers on a peduncle 1–3 mm (0.039–0.118 in) long. Flowering mainly occurs from October to November, and the fruit is a thin-walled, gently curved or coiled pod, 30–80 mm (1.2–3.1 in) long and 3–6 mm (0.12–0.24 in) wide, containing narrowly elliptic seeds 3.5–5 mm (0.14–0.20 in) long.

== Taxonomy ==
Acacia alpina was first formally described in 1863 by Ferdinand von Mueller in his Fragmenta Phytographiae Australiae from specimens collected at an altitude of 4,500–500 ft (1,370–150 m). The specific epithet (alpina) means "of the alps", referring to the species' usual habitat.

== Distribution and habitat ==
Alpine wattle grows in woodlands and heathlands and on open plains in the Snowy Mountains of New South Wales and southern parts of the Australian Capital Territory and further south to around Mount Baw Baw in the eastern Victorian highlands at an altitude of 1,300–1,800 m (4,300–5,900 ft). It is often situated in granitic and windswept areas and sometimes forms dense thickets.

This species is a close relative of Acacia phlebophylla and the two species tend to hybridize. It often can be found in alpine and subalpine areas of Australia.

=== Kosciuszko National Park ===
Acacia alpina occurs within the alpine and subalpine zones of Kosciuszko National Park, along with many other endemic and range‑restricted plant species. Many of these species are endangered or vulnerable, sharing the same habitat as Acacia alpina. Acacia alpina is part of the predominantly native vascular flora of the park, where approximately 77% of taxa are native. Threats to alpine and subalpine species such as Acacia alpina include invasive species, recreational impacts, fire regimes, and more.

=== Invasion risk ===
Among Australian acacias, Acacia alpina was identified as one of the ten species with the highest predicted potential for naturalization if introduced outside Australia. The assessment was based on modeled potential range size, ability to establish in human-disturbed environments, and affiliation with evolutionary lineages within Acacia that have experienced multiple historical range expansions.

== Fire ecology ==
Acacia alpina occurs in alpine shrublands and woodlands that experience infrequent, yet high-severity fires, typically at intervals that exceed several decades. Many species in these communities are fire-sensitive obligate seeders.

Research in sub-alpine woodland systems has recorded Acacia alpina germination following heat and smoke treatments that simulate high-severity fire conditions, suggesting that fire-related cues may stimulate recruitment from the soil seed bank. At the same time, increased fire frequency exceeding historical fire patterns have been associated with reduced species richness and shifts in community composition in sub-alpine systems.

== Climate change ==
Acacia alpina and similar alpine and subalpine plant communities in southeastern Australia are sensitive to climate change. They are largely influenced by temperature and the duration of seasonal snow cover. These species also have narrow elevational ranges and limited capacity for upslope migration. Increased mean temperature, decreased precipitation, and reduced snow cover are projected to affect vegetation structure and composition, potentially contributing to declines in species richness and shifts in species abundance. Acacia alpina and other herbfield communities are likely to be negatively affected as snowbanks become fewer and smaller.

== See also ==
- List of Acacia species
