= Mount Scabby =

Mountain in New South Wales, Australia

- Location within Australian Capital Territory

Highest point
- Elevation: 1,802 m (5,912 ft)
- Prominence: 214 m (702 ft)
- Coordinates: 35°45′37″S 148°51′35″E

Geography
- Location: Australian Capital Territory / New South Wales, Australia
- Parent range: Scabby Range

Mount Scabby is a mountain with an elevation of 1,802 metres (5,912 ft) AHD that is located in the Scabby Range and is situated on the border of the Australian Capital Territory and New South Wales, Australia. The summit of the mountain is located within the ACT. The nearest town to the mountain is Adaminaby, approximately 27.4 kilometres (17.0 mi) to the south.

The ACT portion of the mountain is located within Namadgi National Park and the NSW side within the Scabby Nature Reserve. The Scabby Range includes Mount Scabby, at 1,798 metres (5,899 ft) AHD, which forms part of the catchment area for the Cotter River.

== See also ==
- Australian Alps
- List of mountains of Australia § New South Wales
