= Tantangara Dam =

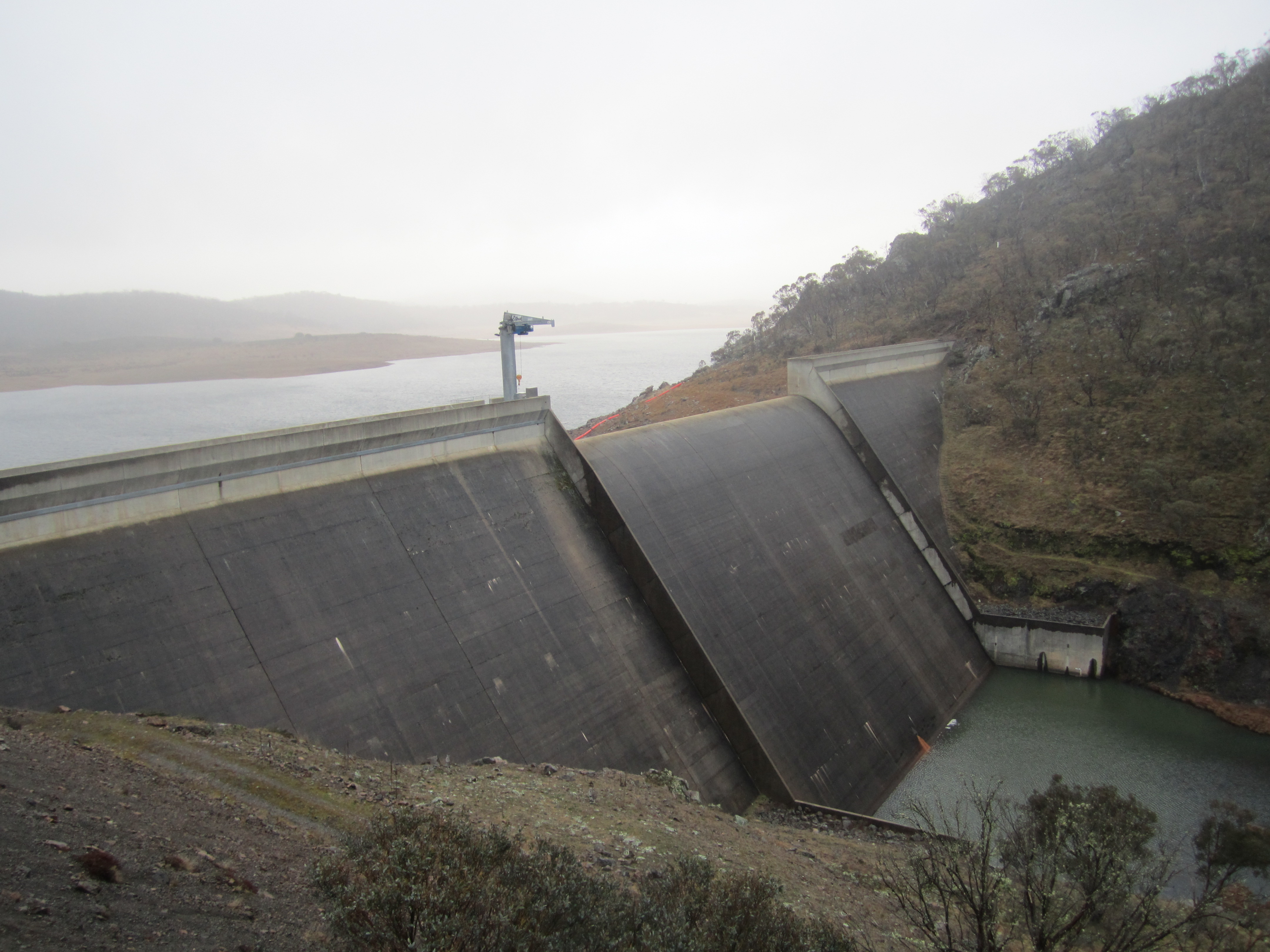
- Tantangara Dam and spillway across the Murrumbidgee River, 2010.

- Location of the Tantangara Dam in New South Wales
- Country: Australia
- Location: Tantangara, Snowy Mountains, New South Wales
- Coordinates: 35°47′44″S 148°39′48″E
- Status: Operational
- Construction began: 1958
- Opening date: 1960
- Owner: Snowy Hydro

Dam and spillways
- Type of dam: Gravity dam
- Impounds: Murrumbidgee River
- Height: 45.1 metres (148 ft)
- Length: 216.4 metres (710 ft)
- Elevation at crest: 1,230 metres (4,040 ft) AHD
- Dam volume: 73,800 cubic metres (2,610,000 cu ft)
- Spillways: 1
- Spillway capacity: 900 cubic metres per second (32,000 cu ft/s)

Reservoir
- Creates: Tantangara Reservoir
- Total capacity: 254,099 megalitres (8,973.4×10^{6} cu ft)
- Catchment area: 460 square kilometres (180 sq mi)
- Surface area: 2,117.7 hectares (5,233 acres)
- Maximum water depth: 19 metres (62 ft)
- Normal elevation: 1,200 metres (3,900 ft)
- Website; Dams at www.snowyhydro.com.au

Tantangara Dam is a major ungated concrete gravity dam with concrete chute spillway across the Murrumbidgee River in Tantangara, upstream of Adaminaby in the Snowy Mountains region of New South Wales, Australia. The dam is part of the Snowy Mountains Scheme, a vast hydroelectricity and irrigation complex constructed in south-east Australia between 1949 and 1974 and now run by Snowy Hydro. The purpose of the dam includes water management and conservation, with much of the impounded headwaters diverted to Lake Eucumbene. The impounded reservoir is called Tantangara Reservoir.

== Location and features ==
Commenced in 1958 and completed in 1960, the Tantangara Dam is located on the Murrumbidgee River, approximately 6 km (3.7 mi) downstream of its confluence with Gurrangorambla Creek and is wholly within the Kosciuszko National Park. Her Royal Highness Princess Alexandra of Kent visited the dam in 1959, during its construction.

The dam was constructed by Utah-Brown & Root Sudamericana on behalf of the Snowy Mountains Hydro-Electric Authority, and is now managed by Snowy Hydro Limited. The concrete gravity dam of 73,800 m^{3} (2,610,000 ft^{3}) is 45 m (148 ft) high, with a crest length of 216 m (709 ft). At 100 per cent capacity, the dam wall holds back 254,099 ML (206,001 acre⋅ft) of water. The surface area of Tantangara Reservoir is 2,117.7 ha (5,233 acres) and the catchment area is 460 km^{2} (180 sq mi). The spillway across the Murrumbidgee River is capable of discharging 900 m^{3}/s (32,000 cu ft/s).

Water flows 16.6 km (10.3 mi) from Tantangara Reservoir to Lake Eucumbene via the 3.1–3.35 m (10.2–11.0 ft) diameter Murrumbidgee-Eucumbene tunnel falling 40 m (130 ft) in the process. Flow is controlled by a 1.83 m × 2.13 m (6 ft 0 in × 7 ft 0 in) regulating gate such that a maximum of 20 m^{3}/s (710 cu ft/s) is allowed. Flow downstream into the Murrumbidgee River is controlled at the dam and comprises two shafts, 2.13 m × 3.05 m (7 ft 0 in × 10 ft 0 in) at the outlet tower and tapering to 2.13 m (7 ft 0 in) diameter before passing through a 1.50 m (4 ft 11 in) diameter nozzle to the river diversion tunnel, with a capacity of 70.8 m^{3}/s (2,500 cu ft/s).

=== Water flows ===
==== Environmental Water ====
The Snowy Water Initiative (SWI) is an agreement for water recovery and environmental flows between the NSW, Victorian and Australian Governments, and Snowy Hydro Limited (SHL) which is set out in the Snowy Water Inquiry Outcomes Implementation Deed 2002 (SWIOID 2002). The SWI provides three main environmental water programs as part of rebalancing the impacts of the Snowy Hydro Scheme on montane rivers. These three programs are increased flows for: (i) Snowy River, (ii) River Murray, and (iii) Snowy Montane Rivers. The Snowy Montane River Increased Flows (SMRIF) program identifies five montane rivers to receive environmental water. The water availability for SMRIF is linked to the water availability for Snowy River Increased Flows (SRIF) (Williams 2017), which is determined by the water recovery in the western rivers and the preceding climatic conditions. The SWIOID 2002 provides for SHL to forego up to 150 gigawatt hours (GW h) of electricity generation to allow for environmental releases to be made to SMRIF. This value of 150 GW h is converted into a volumetric allocation, but the conversion factor differs depending on the location of the releases in the Snowy Mountains Scheme, and thus influence the overall volume released. In some locations water released can be re-used to generate electricity so a smaller conversion factor is applied (SWIOID 2002), however, where water is lost to the Snowy Scheme a higher conversion factor is applied.

Releases to the Murrumbidgee River are made from Tantangara dam, a much larger structure than the other release points, for which a gated release structure is available. Accordingly, the daily flow release strategy for the Murrumbidgee River differs from the other SMRIF release points.

The releases comprise two components: (i) the SMRIF and (ii) a Base Passing Flow (BPF). The BPF has some key components, these being:

- A 2 GL year volume is targeted over the longer term.
- A 32 ML/day discharge is to be targeted at Mittagang Crossing, near Cooma.
- A maximum of 3.5 GL is set for any one year.

The Base Passing Flow releases typically occur during drier weather.

A modified 'flow scaling' approach used to set SRIF releases to the Snowy River has also been applied to the SMRIF in the Murrumbidgee River (;). This modified approach uses the recorded flows in a nearby natural catchment (in a year where similar volumes of flow occurred) to set daily releases. For releases to the Murrumbidgee River from Tantangara dam, the initial daily flow targets were set using the flow sequence for the Murrumbidgee River above Tantangara (station No. 410535). Daily targets are then amended to account for operational implementation.

The SWIOID 2002 identifies a target of 27 GL (i.e. 30% of the Mean Annual Natural Flow- MANF) in a full allocation scenario. Since 2005–06, environmental water has been released to the Upper Murrumbidgee River to repair the condition of the river. Over the period 2005 to 2018, an average of 17.7 GL per year of environmental water has been released to the upper Murrumbidgee River. The annual allocation varied between 4 GL per year during the drought and 42.3 GL per year once sufficient water had been recovered.

The environmental water portfolio does not allow for environmental water to be released everyday of the year from Tantangara Dam. Over the period 2005 to 2018, various environmental flow strategies have attempted to re-instate a winter-spring montane flow pattern. These approaches have attempted to improve instream habitat and ecological processes as the basis for river recovery, rather than the traditional Australian e-water approach of managing rarity of aquatic biota.

A 2011 report by the Snowy Scientific Committee stated that the Tantangara Dam was starving the upper Murrumbidgee River of environmental water flows from the Snowy Mountains; needed to restore river health. The committee claimed that there was an apparent "administrative and managerial void", with no river management strategy and no proper monitoring because of a lack of regulatory resources.

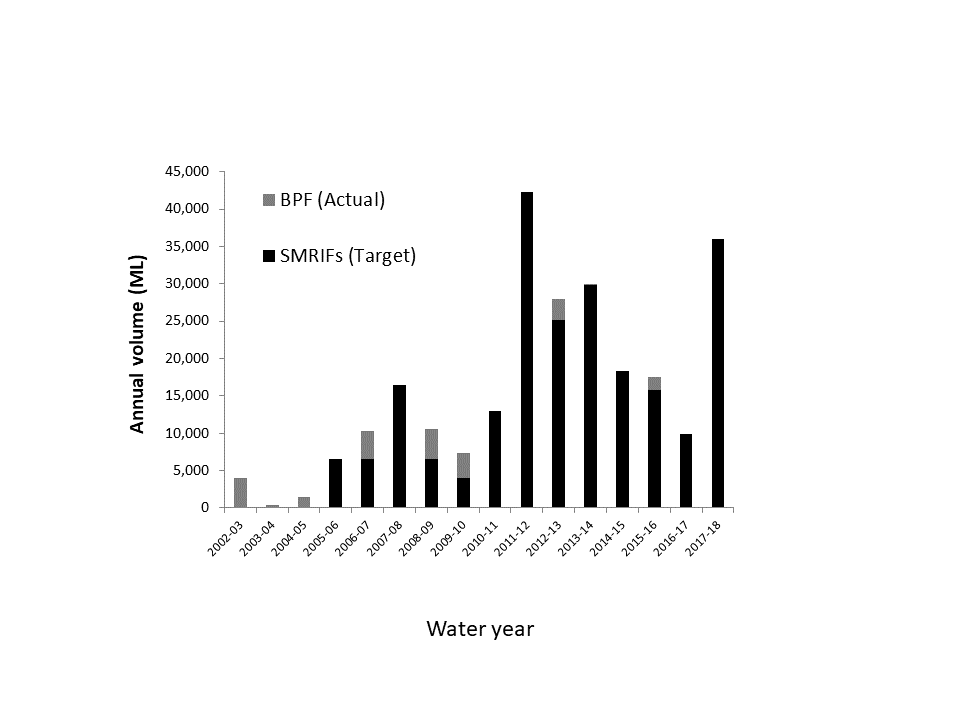
Total annual water released from Tantangara Dam (i) Base Passing Flows and (ii) Environmental water to the Murrumbidgee River, 2002-03-2017-18.

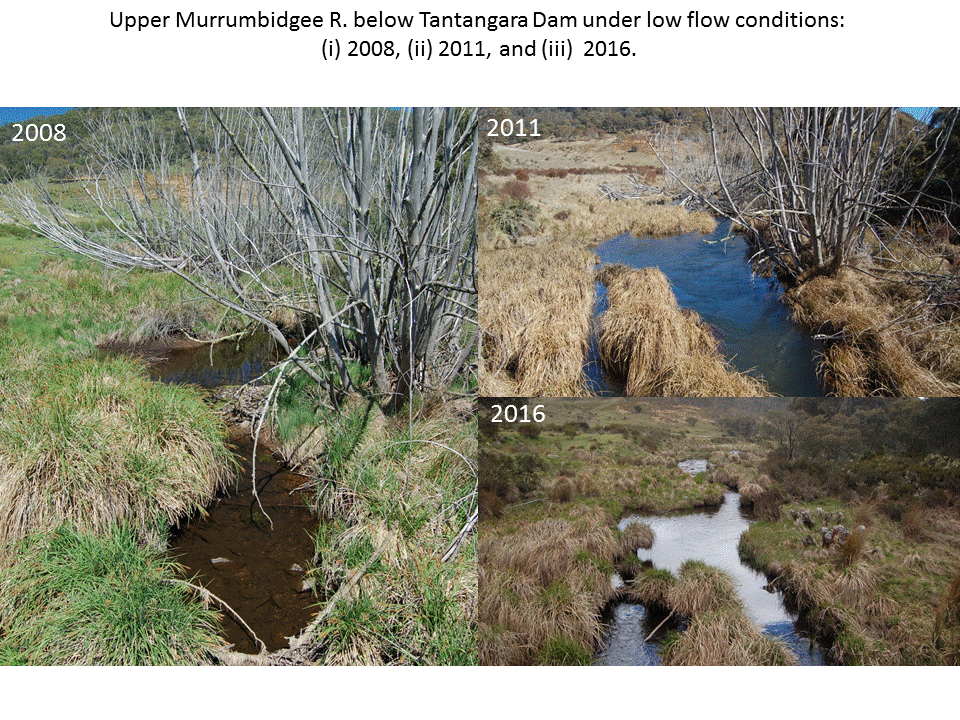
The Murrumbidgee River below Tantangara Dam

==== Water Transfers ====
In 2005, the Australian Capital Territory Government explored the options of augmenting water supply for Canberra by developing a long tunnel alternative including weir, connecting tunnel, outflow pipes, and hydro-power plant construction to link the Murrumbidgee with Corin Reservoir; and/or a Murrumbidgee River flow alternative including weir, pumping station and pipeline construction to link the Murrumbidgee with Googong Reservoir. In 2009, the ACT Government endorsed a recommendation from ACTEW for implementation of the Tantangara Transfer Project, that involves transferring water from the Murrumbidgee River (below the Burrinjuck and Blowering dams) in New South Wales to the ACT via the Snowy Mountains Scheme.

==== Power station ====
The reservoir is a key part of the Snowy 2.0 Pumped Storage Power Station. It will act as the top storage for a pumped hydro power station.

== Recreation ==
Water levels are held at 20% in the summer months so that the Port Philip Trail remains above the water. There are good populations of both brown trout and rainbow trout within the reservoir. The wet winter of 2016 saw levels exceed 70% in October- the highest for 2 decades.

== Gallery ==
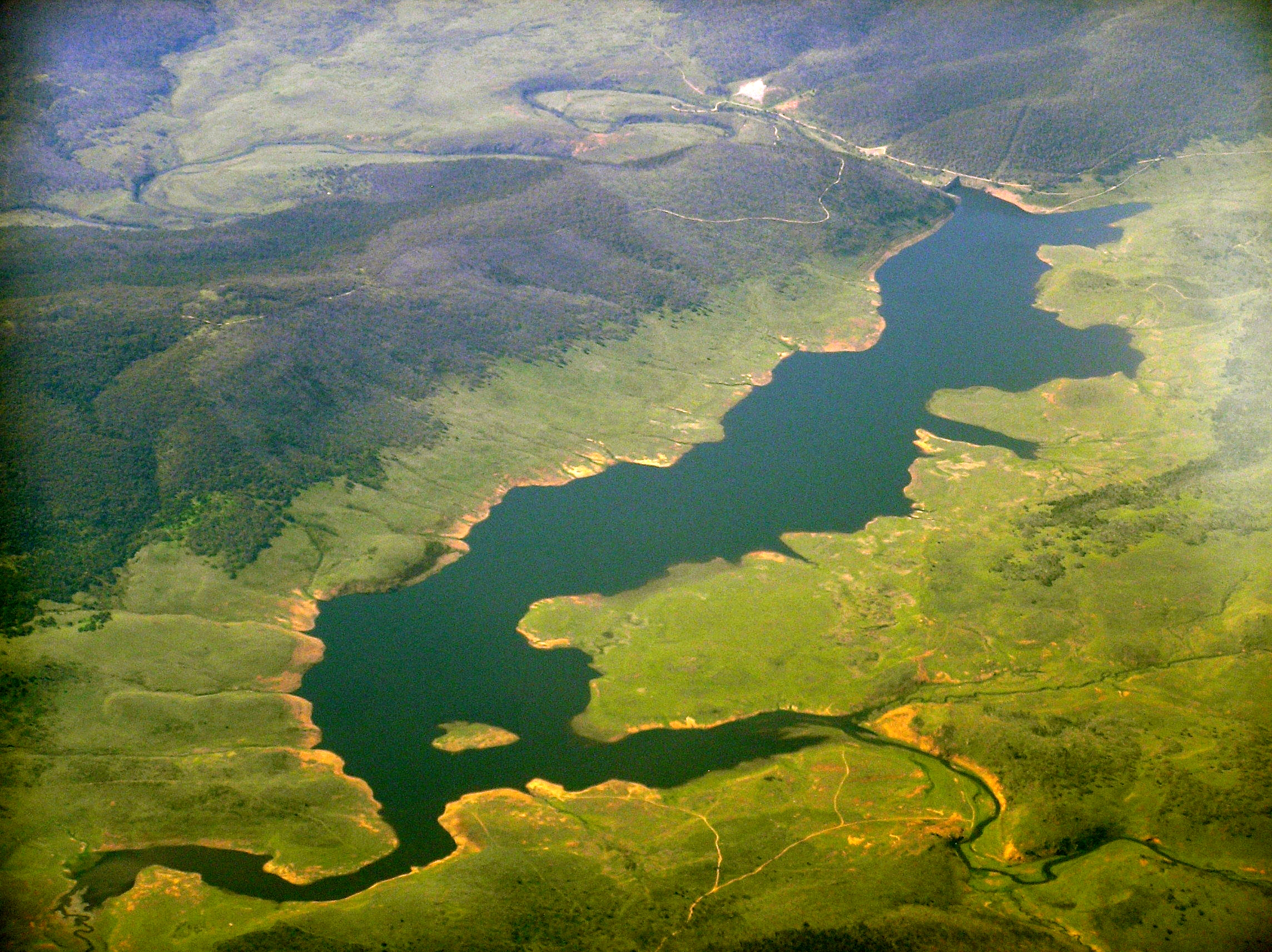
Tantangara Reservoir, viewed from the north west, in 2009.

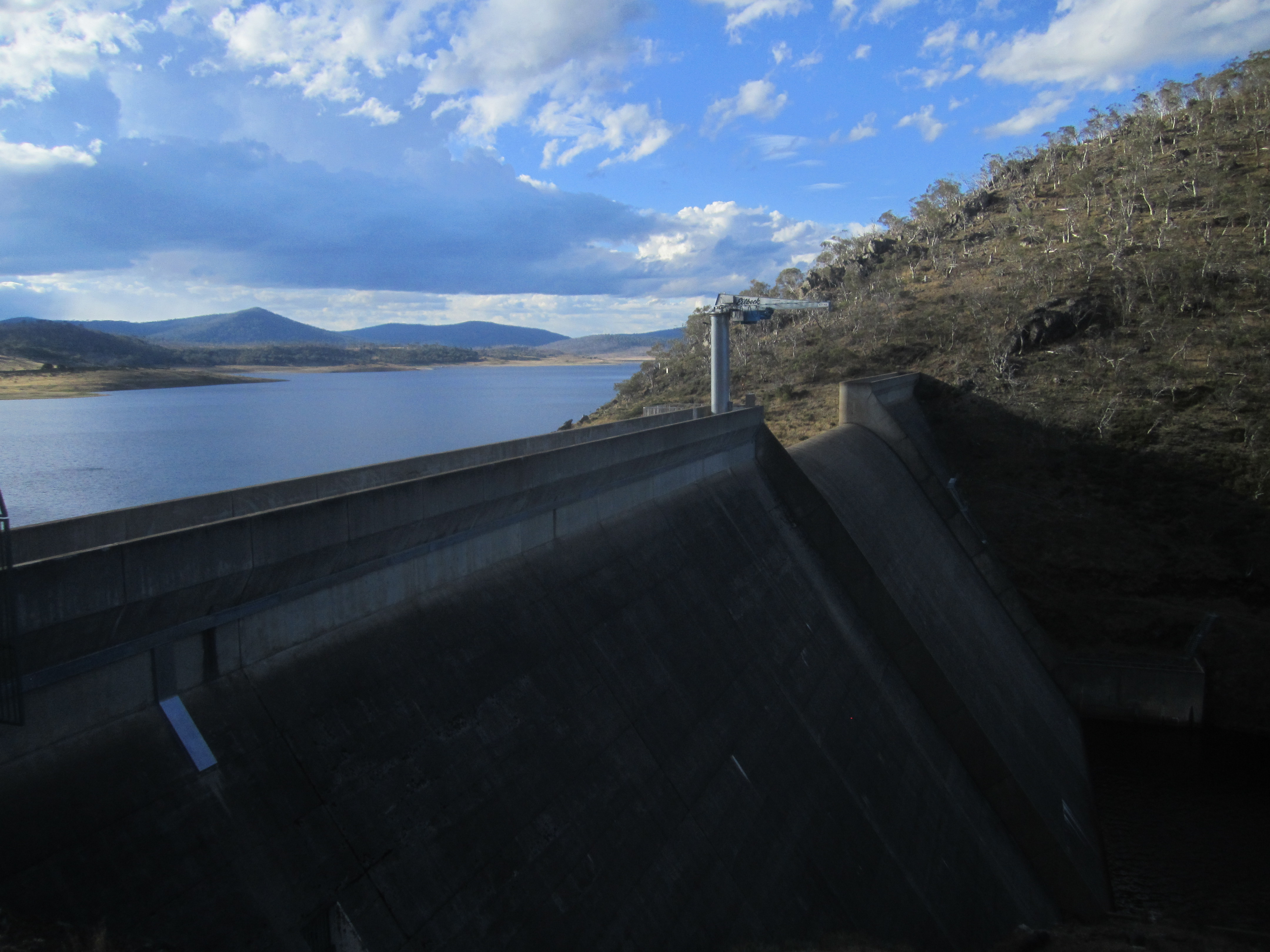
Tantangara Dam wall and spillways, in 2013.

== See also ==
- List of dams and reservoirs in New South Wales
