= Scabby Range Nature Reserve =

- IUCN category Ia (strict nature reserve)
- Location within New South Wales
- Location: New South Wales
- Nearest city: Yaouk
- Coordinates: 35°46′21″S 148°52′48″E
- Area: 48.72 km^{2} (18.81 sq mi)
- Established: 3 December 1982
- Governing body: National Parks and Wildlife Service (New South Wales)

Scabby Range Nature Reserve
- Interactive map of Scabby Range Nature Reserve
- Location: Sams River Fire Trail, Yaouk, New South Wales, Australia

Australian National Heritage List
- Official name: Scabby Range Nature Reserve
- Type: Listed (Natural)
- Designated: 7 November 2008
- Part of: Australian Alps National Parks and Reserves
- Reference no.: 105891

Register of the National Estate
- Official name: Scabby Range Nature Reserve
- Type: Registered (Natural)
- Designated: 30 June 1992
- Reference no.: 13624

Scabby Range Nature Reserve is a heritage-listed protected area at Sams River Fire Trail, Yaouk, New South Wales, Australia. It was established on 3 December 1982 and added to the former Australian Register of the National Estate on 30 June 1992. It was added to the Australian National Heritage List as part of the Australian Alps National Parks and Reserves on 7 November 2008.

== Description ==
Scabby Range Nature Reserve has an area of about 48.72 square kilometres (18.81 sq mi) and is located about 8 kilometres (5.0 mi) north-east of Yaouk.

The Scabby Range Nature Reserve lies adjacent to the south-western portion of the border of the Australian Capital Territory with New South Wales border abutting Namadgi National Park and the Bimberi Wilderness area. It complements these major reserves and shares much of their wilderness character. It embraces a range of subalpine communities which have developed on a rugged and elevated section of the Murrumbidgee granite batholith and adjacent Yaouk leucogranites and Ordovician metasediments. This elevated block is heavily dissected and forms the eastern continuation of the Kosciusko Uplands with contrasting lithology and physiography. It rises to c 1800m above the Yaouk/Cabramatta plain which is a cleared pastoral area lying 600m below. Average annual precipitation is of the order of 1,400mm, some of which falls as snow and with less reliable rainfall in summer when compared to winter precipitation receipt. Above 100mm snow banks may persist for more than 3–4 months amidst the giant tors, domes and rockshelves which dominate the landscape.

The vegetation is clearly subalpine in character at the higher elevations, on the more exposed sites and along the cool air drainage lines, and on the lower slopes well developed montane open forest is extensive. The dominant association is one of alpine ash Eucalyptus delegatensis and mountain gum (Eucalyptus dalrympleana) with various inclusions of the peppermints (Eucalyptus radiata, Eucalyptus dives), manna gum (Eucalyptus viminalis) and snowgum (Eucalyptus pauciflora) which frequently reach 30m in height. Alpine ash is the most prevalent species on slopes with a south-easterly aspect. Here it forms unusual uneven aged stands. Elsewhere on the more exposed, elevated sites, a range of low stature communities exists. Low woodland and tall shrubland of snowgum merges with open heathland of common shaggy pea Oxylobium ellipticumand alpine plum pine Podocarpus lawrencii and swamp heath of Epacris paludosa within polsters of Sphagnum christatum. In the lower depressions, often fringed by stands of black sallee Eucalyptus stellulata are snowgrass herbfields (dominated by Poa spp.) and sedgelands or Carex fens typified by the occurrence of Carex gaudichaudiana. Notable plant species occurrences include that of two rare or vulnerable shrubs, Australian anchor plant Discaria pubescens and an undescribed daisy bush (Olearia sp.2, Sentry Box Hill). Other notable plant species occurrences include that of the uncommon species Bossaiea procumbens, the existence of Acacia alpina on the higher western slopes of Sentry Box Hill (as representing the only wattle species to occur beyond the montane habitat), the association of the restricted Epacris robusta with the alpine shrub Westringia lucida and the fact that here Eucalyptus delegatensis forms unusually uneven aged stands (it normally occurs as a uniformly aged post fire response elsewhere). There is also a record of the restricted and rare Grevillia diminuta, the rare Viola improcera and a distinctive form of the alpine herb Montia australasica also exist in the area. These species are found associated with the rocky microsites of the reserve which support a large number of uncommon or restricted plant taxa. Faunal records for the reserve have not been published. Abundant populations of the common wombat (Vombatus ursinus hirsutus) are present. Other mammals noted as occurring within the reserve include species of antechinus (Antechinus stuartii, Antechinus swainsonii), at least two murid rodents (the southern bush rat, Rattus fuscipes and the uncommon broad toothed rat, Mastacomys fuscus), one possum species (the common ringtail, Pseudocheirus peregrinus peregrinus) and two macropods (the eastern grey kangaroo, Macropus giganteus, and red-necked wallaby, Macropus rufogriseus). More than 200 bird species are listed for Namadgi and would apply to scabby range also since the National Park surrounds this Nature Reserve. This avifauna is typical of tall sclerophyll forests and subalpine woodlands of the southern Monaro and adjacent highlands with rich representation of raptors, old world flycatchers, seasonal influxes of honeyeaters and parrots including the vulnerable glossy black cockatoo Calyptorhynchus lathami and poorly known yellow tailed black cockatoo (Calyptorhynchus funereus). Of note also is the fact that a significant portion of the area's birds move seasonally, overwintering at lower elevations and moving to the higher country such as the Scabby Range in summer. The reserve's herpetofauna is likely to comprise a small number of species consistent with the regional assemblage from cold, high altitude sites. Cool temperature tolerant elapids, a range of saxicoline and fossorial skinks and several species of cryptic, ground frequenting frogs (e.g., Ranidella spp., Limnodynastes tasmaniensis, etc.) make up the herpetofaunal assemblage of the Scabby Range. Mount Kelly at the reserve's northern apex, is an established focus for bushwalkers, affording outstanding panoramas of a scenic landscape with a distinctive wilderness quality.

=== Condition ===
Near natural condition although the ecosystems suffer from the presence of exotic animals, particularly rabbits Oryctolagus cuniculus and pigs Sus scrofa, and with feral horses Equus caballus occasionally damaging high altitude fens and seepages. The reserve, along with the more extensive Namadgi National Park and the Bimberi Range, constitutes an area with considerable wilderness value. (1989)

== Heritage listing ==
The area has significant wilderness value as it comprises part of the core and buffer of an identified Bimberi Wilderness area. It embraces a panoramic collection of scenic peaks and spurlines. The reserve protects a good sample of well developed, minimally disturbed montane forests of mountain gum Eucalyptus dalrympleana and mountain ash (Eucalyptus delegatensis), with the latter species occurring in unusual uneven-aged stands on the south-easterly aspect slopes. Within the reserve, at higher elevations, is a significant group of low stature, subalpine communities including snowgum (Eucalyptus pauciflora) woodland and shrubland, open heathland, swamp heath and sedgeland particularly significant plant assemblages are found associated with the rock shelves, boulder jumbles and granite pavements. These accommodate a significant number of uncommon or restricted species. The nature reserve is the type locality for an undescribed species of daisy bush (Olearia sp. 2, Sentry Box Hill) and contains populations of the rare Australian anchor plant Discaria pubescens. Other notable plant occurrences include Acacia alpina, Bossaiea procumbens, Epacris robusta, Grevillea diminuta, a distinctive form of Montia australasica and Viola improcera. The reserve represents an area of outstanding scenic amenity with high biological value.

Scabby Range Nature Reserve was listed on the Australian Register of the National Estate on 30 June 1992. However, the Register of the National Estate ceased to be a statutory heritage register on 2012, but is retained for archival and education purposes. It was listed on the Australian National Heritage List as part of the Australian Alps National Parks and Reserves on 7 November 2008.
