= Brindabella =

Brindabella may refer to:

- Brindabella Airlines
- Brindabella, a novel for children by Ursula Dubosarsky
- Brindabella Business Park, part of Canberra Airport
- Brindabella College in O'Connor, Australian Capital Territory
- Brindabella electorate
- The Brindabella Ranges
- Brindabella National Park
- Brindabella (yacht), a yacht that won the Sydney to Hobart Yacht Race in 1991 & 1997
- Brindabella Road
- Brindabella Station, the childhood home of Miles Franklin
- Brindabella Valley, the valley of the Goodradigbee River
- Brindabella, New South Wales
- Brindabella FC, an Australian association football club
- Brindabellas, a housing estate in Bonython, Australian Capital Territory
