= Brindabella, New South Wales =

Brindabella
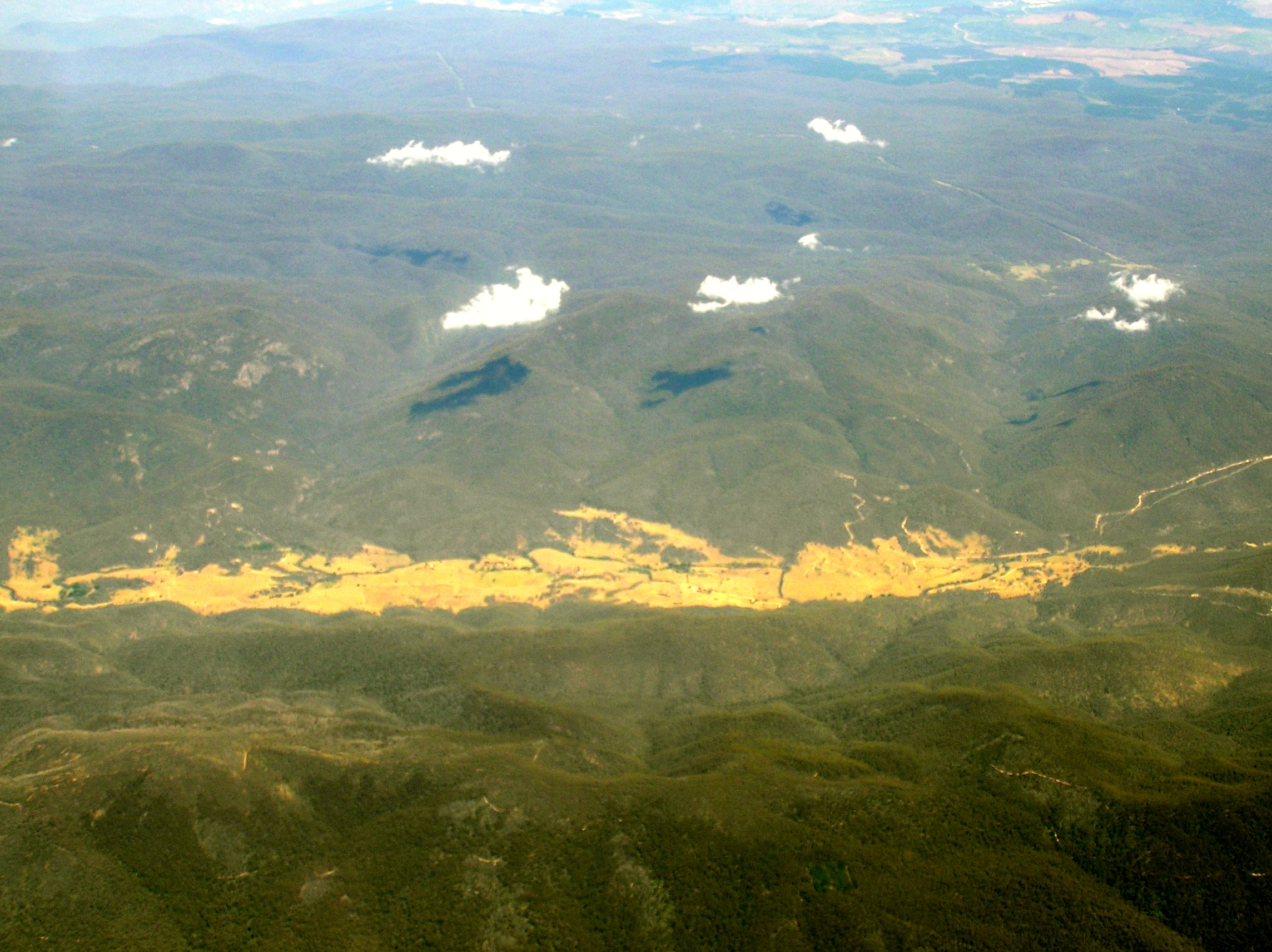
- Aerial view of Brindabella Valley from east

- Coordinates: 35°22′05″S 148°39′08″E
- Country: Australia
- State: New South Wales
- LGAs: Snowy Valleys Council; Yass Valley Council

Government
  - State electorate: Goulburn
  - Federal division: Riverina

Population
  - Total: 22 (2016 census)
- Postcode: 2611
- County: Buccleuch; Cowley
- Parish: Bramina; Brindibella; Clive; Coree; Cromwell
Localities around Brindabella
Tumorrama	Wee Jasper	Uriarra
Argalong	Brindabella	ACT
Goobarragandra	Long Plain	ACT

Brindabella is a locality in south-east New South Wales, Australia, mainly in the area of Snowy Valleys Council and partly in Yass Valley Council. It is reached by the Brindabella Road from the Australian Capital Territory over the Brindabella Ranges. It is significant as the early home of Miles Franklin, who wrote a well known book called Childhood at Brindabella. It had a population of 22 at the 2016 census, who live in the Brindabella Valley. The locality also includes a large unpopulated area consisting of parts of the Brindabella National Park, the Kosciuszko National Park and the Bimberi Nature Reserve and of state forests.

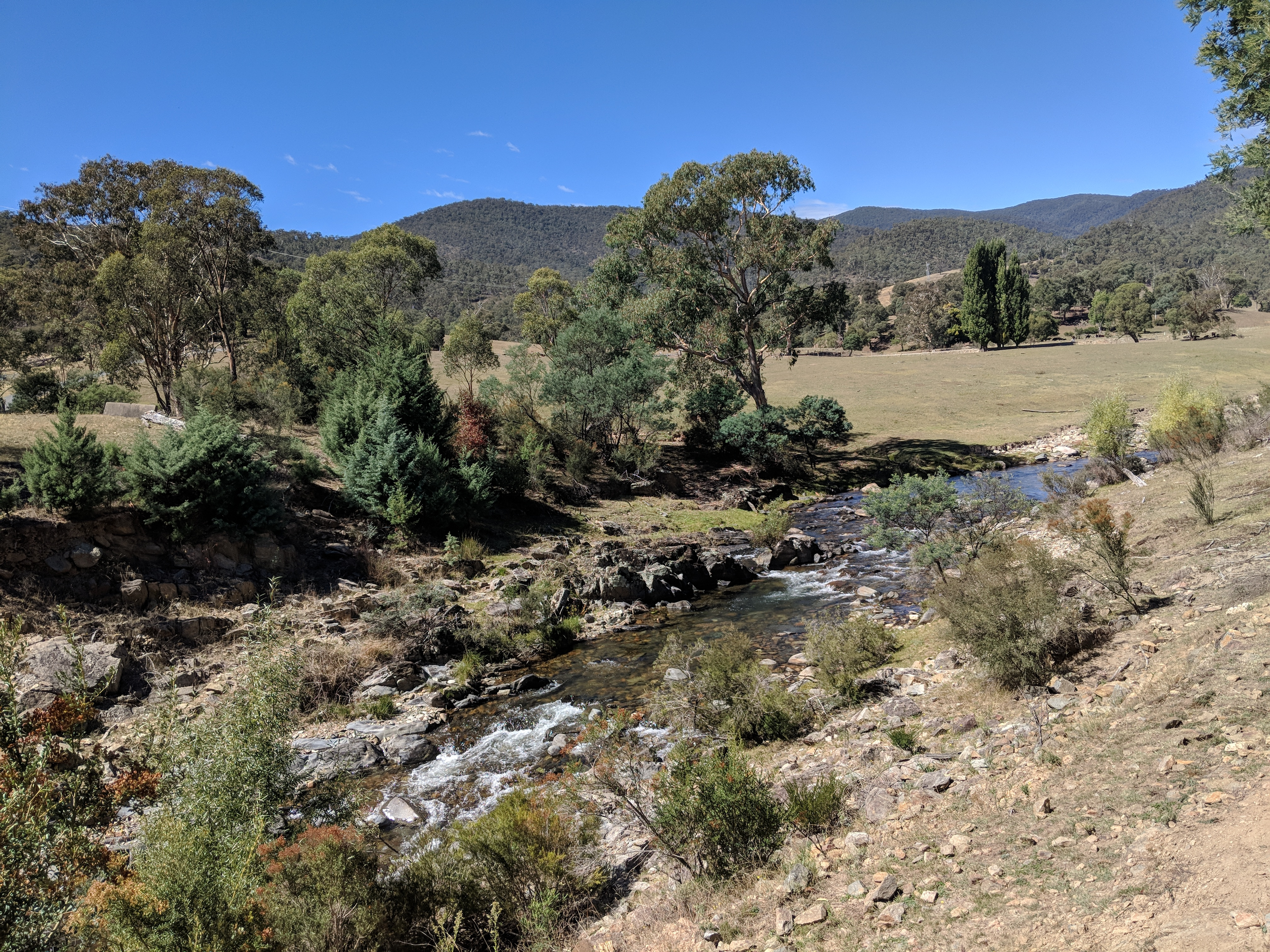
Goodradigbee River in Brindabella

The Goodradigbee River flows north through the valley. A major farm in the valley is Brindabella Station.

== History ==
The place was named by Indigenous Australians as Brindabella, meaning "two kangaroo rats". The area was considered as an outstation of Yarralumla station. Joseph Franklin and his family settled in the Brindabella Valley in 1861 and Thomas Franklin built the first homestead.
