= Brindabella Road =

Road in New South Wales and the Australian Capital Territory

Brindabella Road New South Wales–Australian Capital Territory
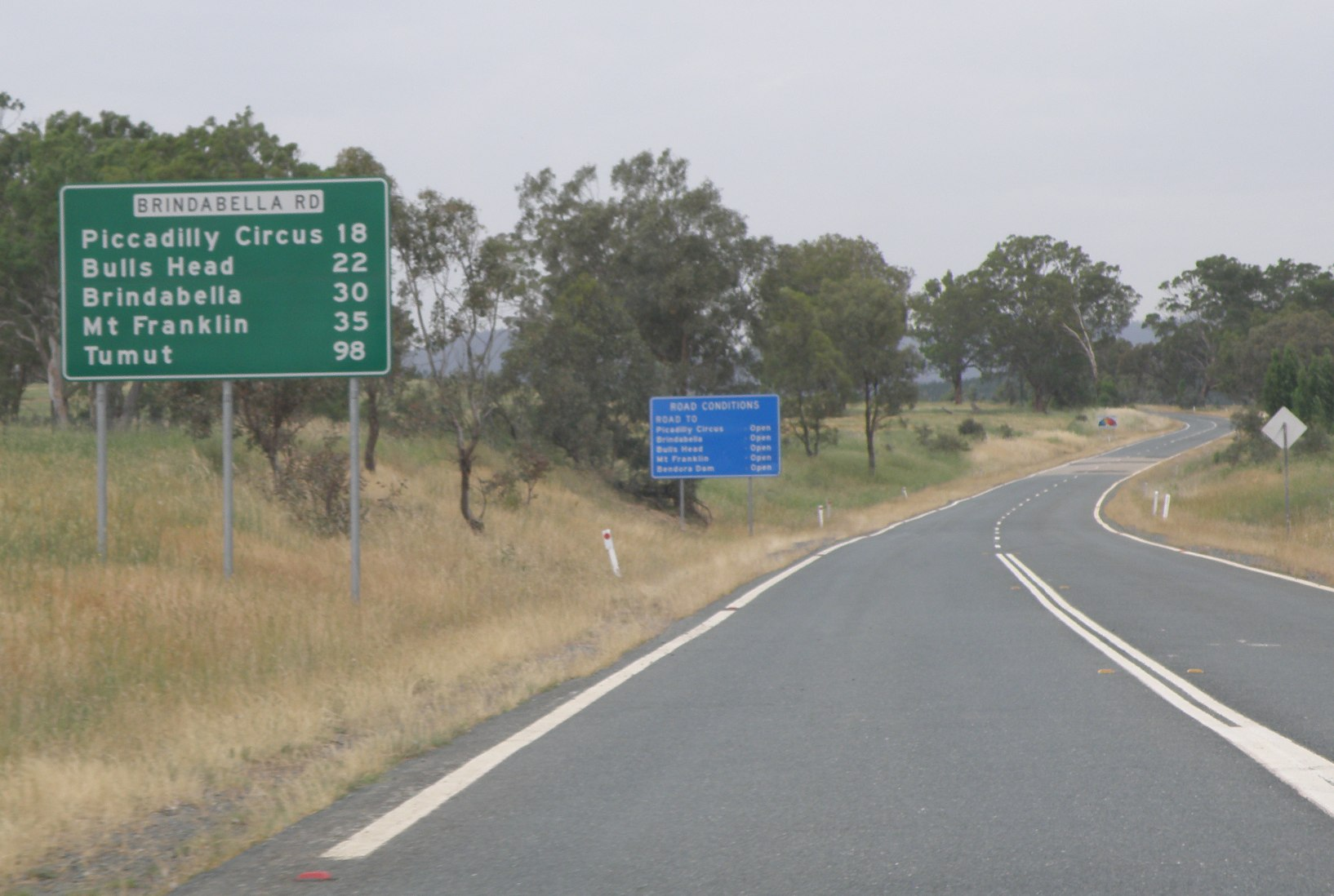
- Brindabella Road at Uriarra Road Junction, ACT

General information
- Type: Rural road
- Length: 63 km (39 mi)

Major junctions
- East end: Bombowlee Creek Road, Tumut, NSW
- West end: Cotter Road, Cotter Dam, ACT

Location(s)
- Major settlements: Brindabella Ranges

Brindabella Road, also known as Tumut Road, links Canberra and Tumut, New South Wales, via the Brindabella Ranges. It provides access to the Brindabella National Park, Namadgi National Park and Kosciuszko National Park as well as the Bondo State Forest. Beginning at Cotter Road near the base of the Cotter Dam, the road climbs toward Uriarra Village, forming the primary access between the village and Canberra. Beyond Uriarra, the road continues south-west towards the ACT/NSW border, passing through the localities of Picadilly Circus, Brindabella and Bondo along the route to Tumut. It crosses the Brindabella Range and Fiery Range, with a highest point of 1,300 metres.

As of 2015, 45 km of the road is unsealed. Within the Australian Capital Territory, the road is sealed except for the last 8.7 km beyond Condor Creek to the border. Other sealed sections exist within New South Wales around the Brindabella locality and Crupper Road to Tumut.

The road is subject to closure due to snow in winter.

The road has been subject to many campaigns to upgrade and seal it for its entire length and convert it to an all seasons road.

Access to Brindabella Station uses part of this road.
