= Tom Cole (farmer) =

Australian dairy farmer

John Thomas Cole (2 November 1854 – 13 May 1927) was an Australian dairy farmer and cattle breeder.

He was born at Jamberoo to emancipist farmer William Cole and Annabella Mackenzie. He was involved in stock shows from 1876 in partnership with his brother Jim. On 6 November 1882 he married Margaret Thorburn. He expanded his property holdings and moved away from the partnership to show cattle alone. On 6 March 1889 he married for a second time, to Agnes Dixon Lamond, with whom he had a daughter. From 1882 to 1890 he was an alderman at Kiama, and he was an unsuccessful Free Trade candidate for Kiama at the 1889 and 1895 elections. In 1895 he moved to Nowra, and he later relocated to Sydney, where he promoted the dairy industry, particularly co-operation across the colony.

From 1899 he was manager of the Scottish Australian Investment Company's farms near Adaminaby, where he integrated his own Illawarra stock. In 1907–08 he transferred to Darbalara. In the ongoing contention between the Milking Shorthorn and Illawarra Dairy Cattle strains, Cole was the leader of the Milking Shorthorn party, and his animals won most awards for the breed in the 1910s and early 1920s. A 1915 account in The Sydney Morning Herald noted:

It is a sad thing when brothers disagree; yet you could never get Mr. Jim Cole, of Coleville, Jamberoo, to agree that Mr. Tom Cole of Darbalara, Gundagai, has produced a better Shorthorn milker than Gold II., whose mother was Old Gold, past champion and heroine of many shows. Nevertheless, the judges have given the blue to Mr. Tom Cole's Camellia II.

His herd at Darbalara was the first to receive regular government testing, and it was publicised widely. One of his cows broke world production records twice, and he was awarded by the New South Wales Chamber of Agriculture in 1925 for eminent service. Until at least the 1950s his Darbalara strain was considered the world's greatest butterfat producing cow.

In 1926 the Darbalara herd was discontinued, and Cole retired. He died at Glebe in 1927, at the age of 72. His will was probated in the Supreme Court of New South Wales.
