= Peppercorn, New South Wales =

Human settlement in Australia

Peppercorn, New South Wales is a civil parish of Buccleuch County in Snowy Valleys Council, New South Wales.

Peppercorn is located at 35°33'54.0"S 148°36'04.0"E. and the nearest town is Yarrangobilly, New South Wales. Although only 35km from Canberra, the Australian capital city, the locality is rugged wilderness.
