= Cromwell, New South Wales =

Coordinates: 35°19′57″S 148°41′02″E

Cromwell Parish is a rural locality of the Snowy Mountains and a civil parish of Buccleuch County, New South Wales, Australia.

The parish located between Wee Jasper, New South Wales and the populated part of Brindabella, New South Wales west of the Australian Capital Territory is partly in the Brindabella National Park. Cromwell Parish is Snowy Valleys Council Area. It is now contained in the area of the locality of Brindabella.
