= Mount Coree =

Mountain in Australian Capital Territory, Australia

- Pabral
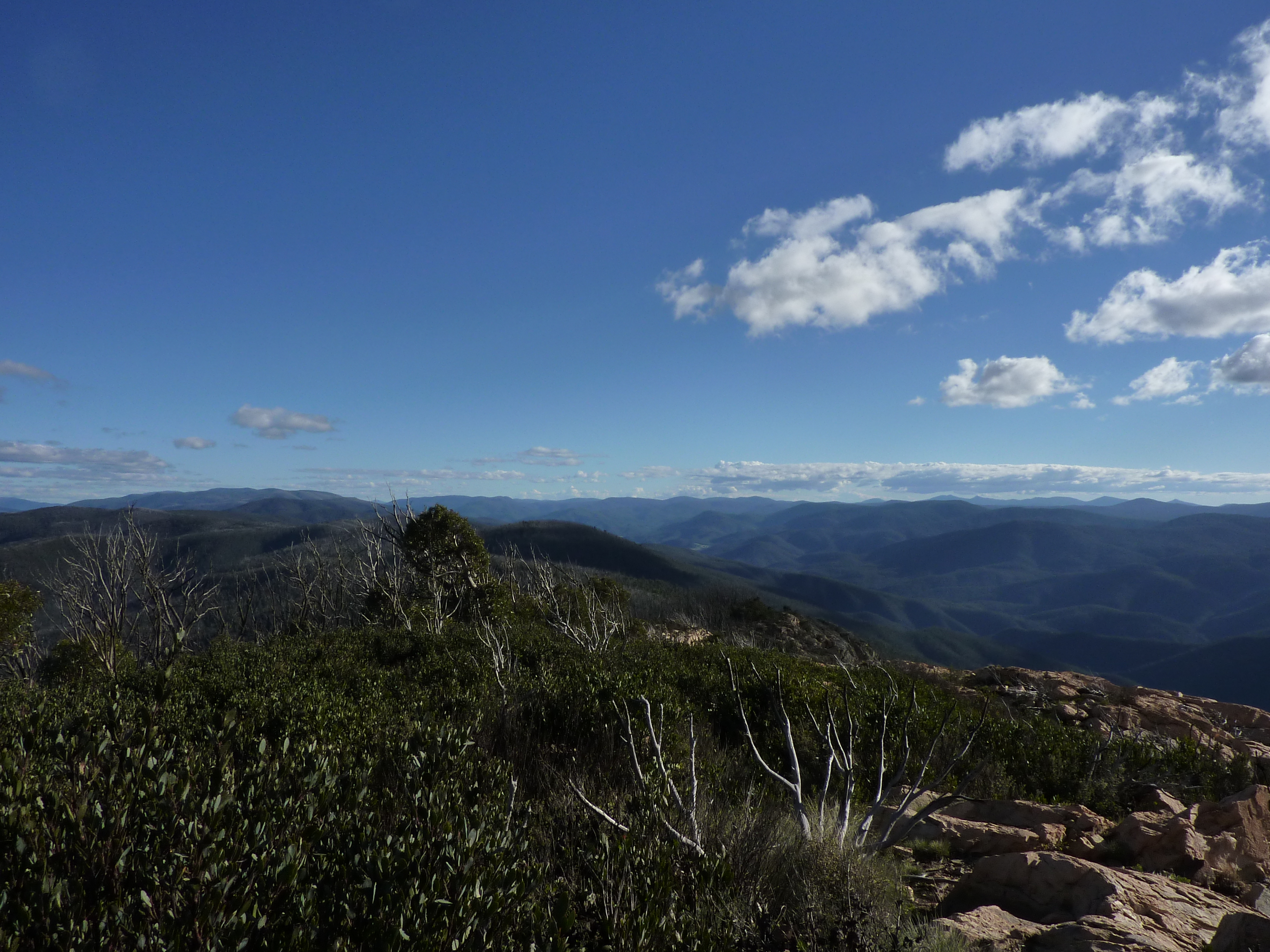

Highest point
- Elevation: 1,421 m (4,662 ft)
- Coordinates: 35°18′23″S 148°48′39″E

Geography
- Location within Australian Capital Territory
- Location: Australian Capital Territory / New South Wales, Australia
- Parent range: Brindabella Range

Mount Coree (formerly known as Pabral) is a mountain with an elevation of 1,421 metres (4,662 ft) AHD that is located within the Brindabella Range on the border between the Australian Capital Territory and New South Wales, Australia. The summit of the mountain is located in the Australian Capital Territory.

== Location and features ==
The mountain is situated in the Brindabella National Park on the NSW side and in the Namadgi National Park on the ACT side. The mountain marks the point where the ACT border changes from a straight north-easterly line to being judged by the watershed of the Cotter River, and the Coree Trigonometrical Station on top of it is officially mentioned as such in the Seat of Government Acceptance Act, 1909 (Cth) which established the borders of the ACT.

Before European settlement, the mountain was used by Indigenous Australian tribes to hunt for bogong moths. Coree is an aboriginal name for moth. Mount Coree was originally shown as "Pabral" on an 1834 map of Major Sir Thomas Mitchell, an Australian colonial explorer.

== See also ==
- List of mountains of Australia
