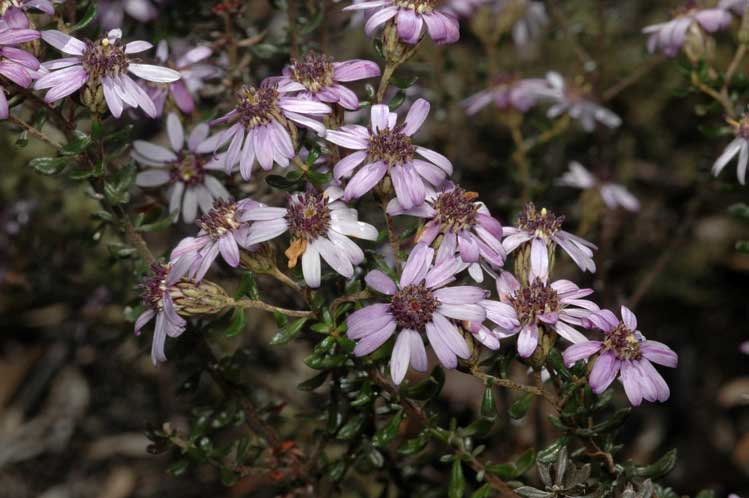
- Near Numeralla

Scientific classification
- Kingdom: Plantae
- Clade: Tracheophytes
- Clade: Angiosperms
- Clade: Eudicots
- Clade: Asterids
- Order: Asterales
- Family: Asteraceae
- Genus: Olearia
- Species: O. iodochroa

Binomial name
- Olearia iodochroa (F.Muell.) Benth.

Synonyms
- Aster iodochrous (F.Muell.) F.Muell.; Eurybia iodochroa F.Muell.; Olearia iodochroa F.Muell. nom. inval., pro syn.

= Olearia iodochroa =

Species of shrub

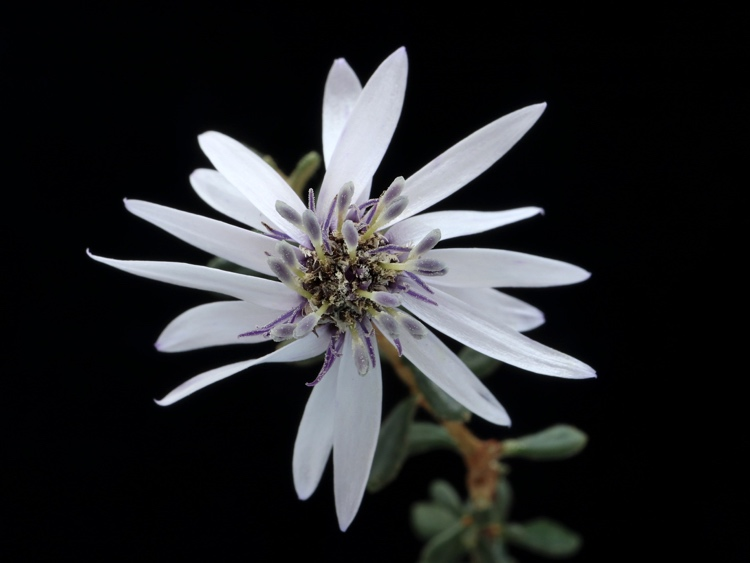
Detail

Olearia iodochroa, commonly known as the violet daisy bush, is a species of flowering plant in the family Asteraceae and is endemic to south-eastern continental Australia. It is a shrub with branchlets densely covered with whitish hairs, narrowly egg-shaped leaves with the narrower end towards the base, and white or mauve, and cream-coloured, yellow or blue, daisy-like inflorescences.

== Description ==
Olearia iodochroa is a usually a shrub that typically grows to a height of 1.0–1.5 m (3 ft 3 in – 4 ft 11 in), its branchlets densely covered with whitish hairs. The leaves are arranged alternately, more or less sessile, egg-shaped or trowel-shaped with the narrower end towards the base, 2–11 mm (0.079–0.433 in) long and 1.5–3.5 mm (0.059–0.138 in) wide. The lower surface of the leaves is densely covered with hairs similar to those on the branchlets, and the upper surface is glabrous. The heads or daisy-like "flowers" are arranged singly or in small groups on the ends of branchlets and are 15–30 mm (0.59–1.18 in) in diameter and more or less sessile. There are three or four rows of bracts at the base of each head, forming a conical involucre 4.5–6 mm (0.18–0.24 in) long. Each head has seven to fifteen white or mauve ray florets, the ligule 4–9 mm (0.16–0.35 in) long, surrounding five to sixteen cream-coloured, yellow or blue disc florets. Flowering occurs from June to October and the fruit is a densely silky-hairy achene, the pappus with 30–48 bristles about 5 mm (0.20 in) long.

== Taxonomy ==
Violet daisy bush was first formally described in 1860 by Ferdinand von Mueller who gave it the name Eurybia iodochroa in his Fragmenta Phytographiae Australiae from specimens collected near the Genoa River. In 1867, George Bentham changed the name to Olearia iodochroa in Flora Australiensis. The specific epithet (iodochroa) means "violet coloured".

== Distribution and habitat ==
Olearia iodochroa grows on rocky outcrops in woodland and forest in elevated places from Bimberi Peak and Captains Flat in south-eastern New South Wales to the far east of Victoria.

== Use in horticulture ==
This daisy bush can be grown from seed or from cuttings and is hardy in most soils if grown in full sun or part shade. It can be grown as a hedge if planted side-by-side, and kept pruned.
