= Brindabella Valley =

Valley of the Goodradigbee River, Australia

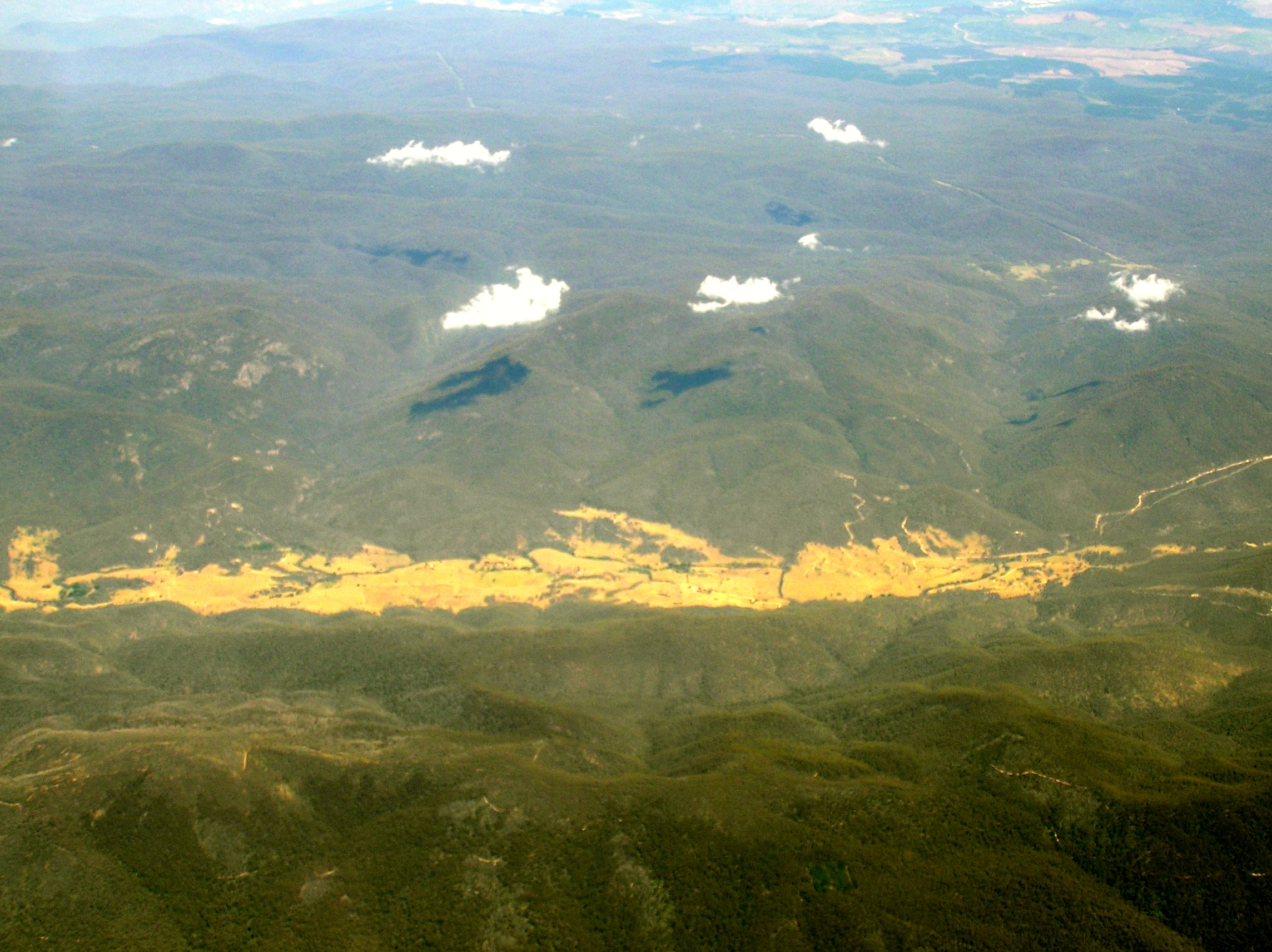
- Aerial view of Brindabella Valley from east

- Location within New South Wales
- Long-axis direction: North-South
- Depth: 600–800 m (2,000–2,600 ft)

Geology
- Age: Palaeozoic

Geography
- Location: New South Wales, Australia
- Population centers: Brindabella
- Borders on: Brindabella Range (east); and Fiery Mountain Range
- Coordinates: 35°22′08″S 148°39′06″E
- Rivers: Goodradigbee River, Brindabella Creek
- Interactive map of Brindabella Valley

The Brindabella Valley is a valley situated below the western ridge-line of the Brindabella Range, located midway along the Goodradigbee River, in the south of New South Wales, Australia.

== Location and features ==
The valley is framed by the Brindabella Range and the Fiery Mountain Range, most notably by Mount Bramina and Bulls Head in the north and Black Bottle Mountain and Mount Franklin in the south. The valley is largely gentle, undulating farmland rising from 620 metres (2,030 ft) above sea level in the north to 700 metres (2,300 ft) above sea level in the south. Most of the native vegetation in the valley has been removed in favour of pasture, fruit trees and other exotic species, however the surrounding mountains are largely national parks, populated entirely with native flora.

The traditional custodians of the area now known as the Brindabella Valley are the Ngunawal, Walgalu and Djimantan indigenous peoples. The valley was first settled by Europeans as a stock outstation for the Yarralumla station in the 1830s, with the first land grant made in 1849. Gold was found in 1860 and mined from the 1880s. In 1887 the Brindabella Gold Mining Company was formed and mining continued until 1910. The valley is now an agricultural area and consists of a number of small cattle farms including the heritage-listed Brindabella Station, the childhood home of Miles Franklin, an early 20th-century Australian author.

Access to the Brindabella Valley is via dirt roads from Canberra or Tumut. A private road runs through Long Plain toward Rules Point and Kiandra, and access is rarely permitted. All roads are subject to frequent closures during heavy snow in winter.

The Goodbradigbee River is a popular trout fishing location for Canberra anglers and camp sites were once provided on the east bank of the river within the valley, but since 2017 this area has been rezoned as a travelling stock route and camping is now no longer permitted anywhere in the valley. Much of the river is difficult to reach without crossing private property and anglers should be aware that certain landowners are unlikely to grant access. In 1968 the National Capital Development Commission considered daming the Brindabella Valley for the purpose of sending water from the Goodbradigbee River into the Cotter River via a tunnel. The plan was abandoned.

A notable feature of the valley are the transmission lines running from the Snowy Mountains Hydro-Electric Scheme to Canberra.

== See also ==
- Brindabella
- Brindabella Range
- Brindabella Station
- Brindabella National Park
