= Boraig, New South Wales =

Aussie rural locality

Boraig, New South Wales is a rural locality in the Snowy Mountains, west of Canberra, Australia, and is also a civil Parish of Buccleuch County.

Boraig is on the Snowy Mountains Highway, south east of Tumut, New South Wales, and west of Canberra, Australia. Much of Boraig is taken up by Talbingo Dam.

Boraig is located at 35°38′54″S 148°22′04″E in the Snowy Valleys Council Area.
