= Bogong, New South Wales =

Bogong, New South Wales is a wilderness area in the Snowy Mountains of Australia.

Bogong is located at 35°26'54.0"S 148°18'04.0"E and is also a civil Parish of Buccleuch County. and the postcode is 2720.
