= Bramina, New South Wales =

Rural locality in Buccleuch County, Australia

Bramina
- Rural locality
- Location within Australia Location within New South Wales
- Coordinates: 35°27′54″S 148°40′04″E
- Country: Australia
- State: New South Wales
- County: Buccleuch County
- Subregion: Snowy Mountains

Bramina is a rural locality of the Snowy Mountains and a civil parish of Buccleuch County, New South Wales.

The parish is located on the border with Australian Capital Territory and is entirely in the Kosciuszko National Park. Bramina is in the Snowy Valleys Council area and now forms part of the locality of Brindabella.
