= Clive, New South Wales =

Civil parish in New South Wales, Australia

Coordinates: 35°14′57″S 148°40′02″E

Clive, New South Wales is a civil parish of Buccleuch County in New South Wales, Australia.

It is located mainly in part of the locality of Brindabella that lies in Yass Valley Council, although most of the locality lies in the Snowy Valleys Council. Some of Clive is also located in the part of Brindabella in Snowy Valleys Council and some of it is located in the locality of Wee Jasper, which is located in Yass Valley Council. It is mainly composed of state forests and is 50 kilometres west of Canberra in a straight line or more than 100 km by road.
