= Baloo, New South Wales =

Baloo, New South wales is a rural locality in the Snowy Mountains of New South wales and a civil Parish of the Buccleuch County.

Baloo is on the Snowy Mountains Highway, 10 kilometers south east of Tumut, New South Wales, Australia.
