= Nanangroe, New South Wales =

Civil parish in Buccleuch County. New South Wales

Coordinates: 34°57′57″S 148°29′02″E

Nanangroe is a civil parish of Buccleuch County, New South Wales. The rural locality of Nanangroe is located south of the Murrumbidgee River, and west of Burrinjuck, New South Wales. It is now considered part of the bounded rural locality of Adjungbilly in the Cootamundra-Gundagai Regional Council.
