= Blowering, New South Wales =

Blowering
- Town
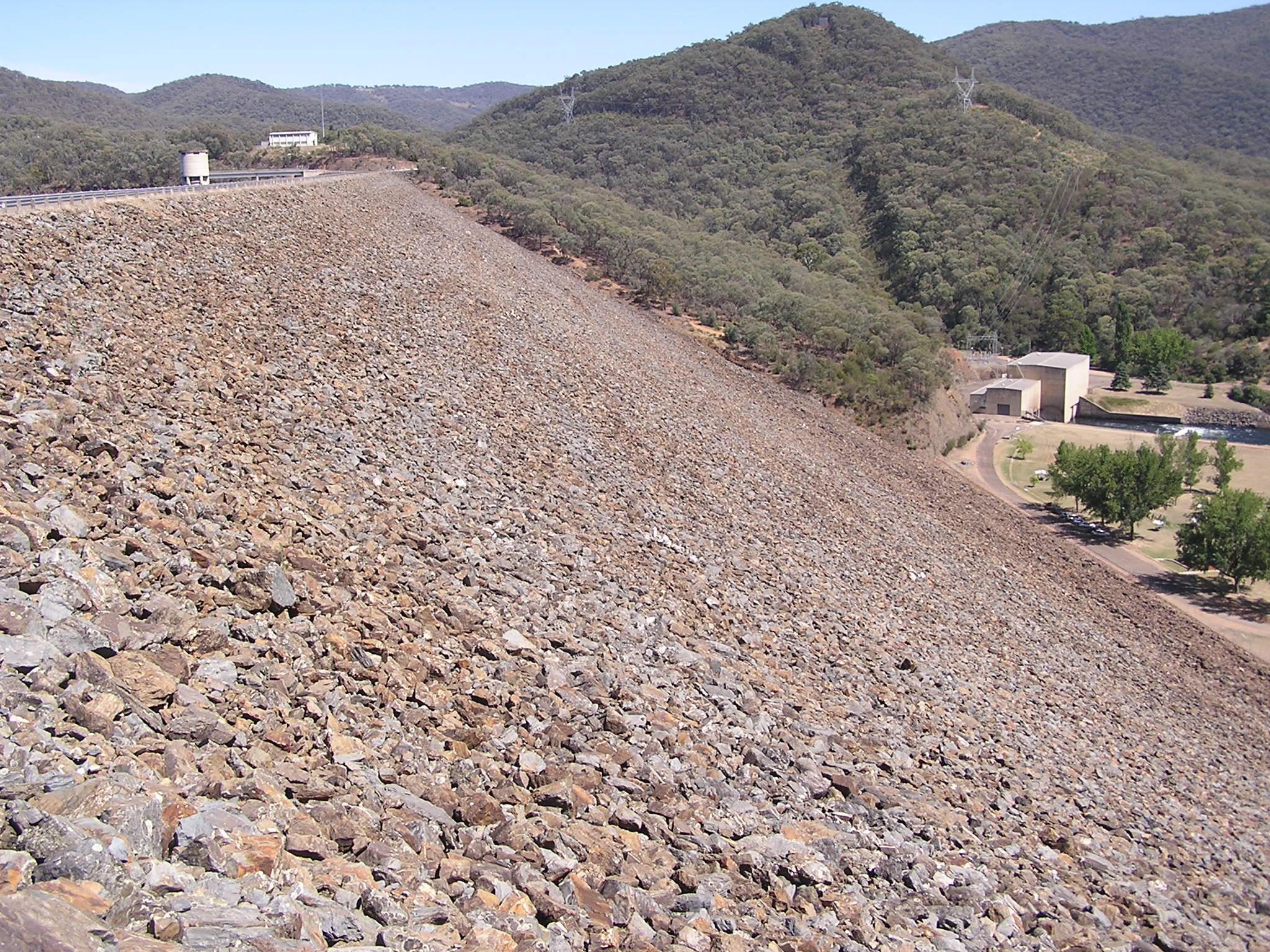
- Blowering Dam Wall
- Interactive map of Blowering
- Coordinates: 35°27′S 148°16′E
- Country: Australia
- State: New South Wales
- LGA: Snowy Valleys Council
- Location: 10 km (6.2 mi) south of Tumut

Government
  - State electorate: Wagga Wagga
  - Federal division: Riverina

Population
  - Total: 0 (2016 census)
- County: Buccleuch County

Blowering, New South wales is a rural locality in the Snowy Mountains of New South wales and a civil Parish of Buccleuch County.

Blowering is on the Snowy Mountains Highway, 10 kilometres south of Tumut, New South Wales, Australia. Blowering is on the Tumut River and the site of Blowering Dam.
