= Wyangle =

Wyangle, New South Wales is a bounded rural locality west of Canberra, Australia and about 16 km. north-east of Tumut.

Wyangle is also a civil Parish of Buccleuch County.

Wyangle is located at 35°12′54″S 148°23′04″E and is in the Snowy Valleys Council Area.
