= Buccleuch County =

Buccleuch
- Cadastral division
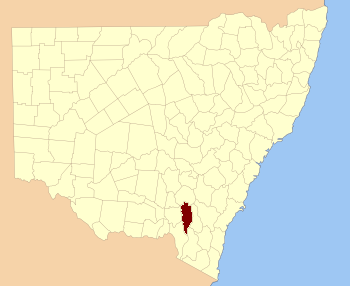
- Location in New South Wales
- Country: Australia
- State: New South Wales
Lands administrative divisions around Buccleuch
Clarendon	Harden	Harden
Wynyard	Buccleuch	Cowley
Selwyn	Wallace	Wallace

Buccleuch County is one of the 141 cadastral divisions of New South Wales. It contains the locality of Adjungbilly. The Murrumbidgee River is at the northern boundary, with the Goodradigbee River on the eastern boundary, and the Tumut River on the western boundary. It includes the northern part of the Kosciuszko National Park.

Buccleuch County was named in honour of the Duke of Buccleuch (1806–1884).

== Parishes within this county ==
A full list of parishes found within this county; their current LGA and mapping coordinates to the approximate centre of each location is as follows:

Parish	LGA	Coordinates
Adjungbilly	Cootamundra-Gundagai Regional Council	35°05′54″S 148°24′04″E
Baloo	Snowy Valleys Council	35°25′54″S 148°23′04″E
Blowering	Snowy Valleys Council	35°22′54″S 148°17′04″E
Bogong	Snowy Valleys Council	35°26′54″S 148°18′04″E
Boraig	Snowy Valleys Council	35°38′54″S 148°22′04″E
Bramina	Snowy Valleys Council	35°27′54″S 148°40′04″E
Brungle	Snowy Valleys Council	35°09′54″S 148°15′04″E
Bundarbo	Cootamundra-Gundagai Regional Council	34°54′49″S 148°21′08″E
Bungongo	Cootamundra-Gundagai Regional Council	34°59′49″S 148°26′04″E
Childowla	Cootamundra-Gundagai Regional Council	34°59′54″S 148°30′04″E
Clive	Yass Valley Council	35°14′54″S 148°40′04″E
Cooleman	Snowy Valleys Council	35°17′54″S 148°26′04″E
Cowrajago	Snowy Valleys Council	35°08′54″S 148°30′04″E
Cromwell	Snowy Valleys Council	35°19′54″S 148°41′04″E
Darbalara	Cootamundra-Gundagai Regional Council	35°01′54″S 148°15′04″E
Garnet	Snowy Valleys Council	35°23′54″S 148°34′04″E
Goobarragandra	Snowy Valleys Council	35°29′54″S 148°33′04″E
Goobarralong	Cootamundra-Gundagai Regional Council	34°58′54″S 148°21′04″E
Jibeen	Snowy Valleys Council	35°29′54″S 148°30′04″E
Jounama	Snowy Valleys Council	35°37′54″S 148°25′04″E
Killimicat	Snowy Valleys Council	35°14′54″S 148°15′04″E
Mundongo	Snowy Valleys Council	35°16′54″S 147°19′04″E
Nanangroe	Cootamundra-Gundagai Regional Council	34°55′54″S 148°28′04″E
Napier	Yass Valley Council	35°16′54″S 148°34′04″E
Nimbo	Snowy Valleys Council	35°19′54″S 148°30′04″E
Peppercorn	Snowy Valleys Council	35°33′54″S 148°36′04″E
Pinbeyan	Snowy Valleys Council	35°44′54″S 148°24′04″E
Talbingo	Snowy Valleys Council	35°33′54″S 148°20′04″E
The Peaks	Snowy Valleys Council	35°36′54″S 148°30′04″E
Tumorrama	Snowy Valleys Council	35°14′54″S 148°30′04″E
Wagara	Cootamundra-Gundagai Regional Council	35°04′54″S 148°15′04″E
Wee Jasper	Yass Valley Council	35°10′54″S 148°38′04″E
West Goodradigbee	Yass Valley Council	35°02′54″S 148°37′04″E
Wyangle	Snowy Valleys Council	35°12′54″S 148°23′04″E
Yarrangobilly	Snowy Valleys Council	35°44′54″S 148°30′04″E
