= Jounama, New South Wales =

Jounama is a rural locality in the Snowy Mountains of New South wales and a civil Parish of the Buccleuch County.

Jounama is on the western side of the ranges on Jounama Creek and the Snowy Mountains Highway, 75 kilometres (47 mi) south-west of Canberra as the crow flies.

== Climate ==
Jounama yields a similar climate to that of Kiandra, albeit of greater continentality due to its more inland location west of the Divide; diurnal range is especially impressive, with a mean daily range of 5.3 to 25.2 °C (41.5 to 77.4 °F) in January. Snowfall is frequent, and oftentimes, heavy.

Climate data for Jounama State Forest (1938–1956, rainfall 1922–1994); 1,067 m AMSL; 35.60° S, 148.45° E
Month	Jan	Feb	Mar	Apr	May	Jun	Jul	Aug	Sep	Oct	Nov	Dec	Year
Mean daily maximum °C (°F)	25.2 (77.4)	24.0 (75.2)	22.0 (71.6)	16.4 (61.5)	12.1 (53.8)	8.4 (47.1)	7.2 (45.0)	8.3 (46.9)	12.3 (54.1)	15.4 (59.7)	18.9 (66.0)	22.9 (73.2)	16.1 (61.0)
Mean daily minimum °C (°F)	5.3 (41.5)	5.3 (41.5)	3.5 (38.3)	0.2 (32.4)	−1.4 (29.5)	−2.0 (28.4)	−3.7 (25.3)	−3.0 (26.6)	−2.0 (28.4)	0.5 (32.9)	2.6 (36.7)	4.0 (39.2)	0.8 (33.4)
Average precipitation mm (inches)	75.2 (2.96)	68.2 (2.69)	93.1 (3.67)	102.1 (4.02)	113.9 (4.48)	140.8 (5.54)	137.9 (5.43)	153.7 (6.05)	117.9 (4.64)	141.9 (5.59)	102.4 (4.03)	80.9 (3.19)	1,327.9 (52.28)
Average precipitation days (≥ 0.2 mm)	5.8	6.0	7.3	8.9	10.0	12.5	13.2	13.4	10.8	11.4	9.3	6.9	115.5
Source: Australian Bureau of Meteorology; Jounama State Forest
