= Bimberi Peak =

Mountain in the Brindabella Range, Australia

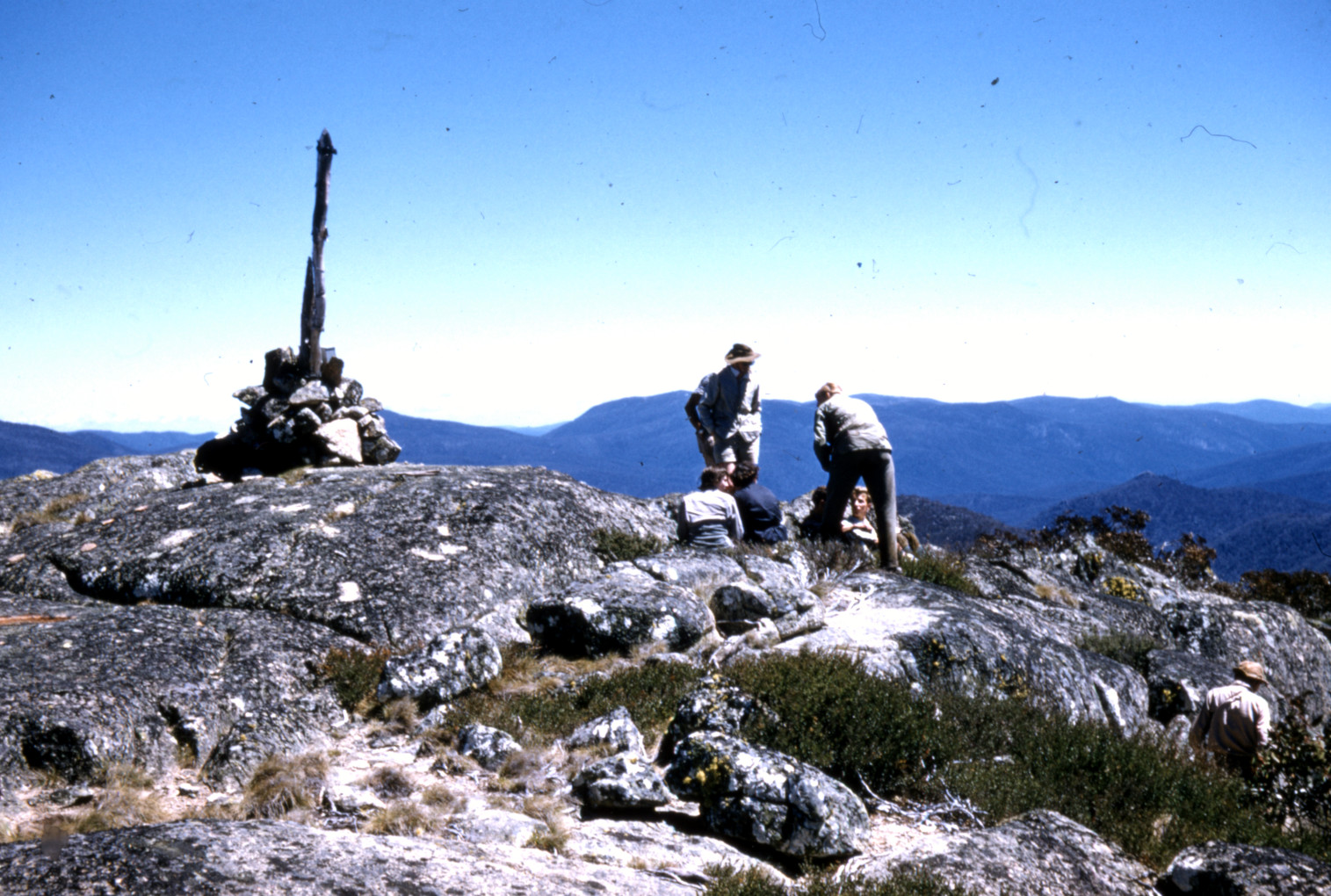
- Bimberi Peak summit

Highest point
- Elevation: 1,913 m (6,276 ft)
- Prominence: 661 m (2,169 ft)
- Listing: Territory high point
- Coordinates: 35°39′39″S 148°47′21″E

Geography
- Location within Australian Capital Territory
- Location: Australian Capital Territory / New South Wales, Australia
- Parent range: Brindabella Ranges

Climbing
- Easiest route: Hike (approx 5 hours to peak)

Bimberi Peak or Mount Bimberi, with an elevation of 1,913 metres (6,276 ft) and located within the Brindabella Ranges, is the highest mountain in the Australian Capital Territory (ACT). It is located on the border between New South Wales (NSW) and the ACT, the NSW portion in Kosciuszko National Park and the ACT portion in Namadgi National Park. It is accessible by bush walking trails and requires no specialised climbing skills, although there is no marked trail to the very summit.

== Routes ==
Bimberi Peak can be reached along the Australian Alps Walking Track, from the east through the ACT, or from the west through NSW, approximately 40 kilometres (25 mi) north northwest of Adaminaby that ascends the southern ridge.

When climbing Bimberi from the west, a dirt road, that is closed during winter, leads to a locked gate at Currango Plain, called Pockets Saddle Road Gate, a gain of 650 metres (2,130 ft). The trailhead commences at an elevation of 1,270 metres (4,170 ft) as an easy two–hour walk 3.3 kilometres (2.1 mi) along a fire trail passes by Oldfields Hut and crosses several streams, before reaching a gate at Murray's Gap, an ascent of 430 metres (1,410 ft) over 4.3 kilometres (2.7 mi). From there the ascent is best accessed by breaking away from the trail and hiking up the southern ridge of the summit, taking about 3–3.5 hours to climb over 2.9 kilometres (1.8 mi). Following the ridge up is the easiest way to summit, although taking a compass bearing is useful. The total distance via this route is about 10.5 kilometres (6.5 mi). There is a large surveyors mark at the summit.

== Vegetation and weather ==
The top of Bimberi Peak is above the tree line. Strong winds blow across the summit. During winter Bimberi is generally covered in snow.

== See also ==
- List of mountains in Australia
- List of mountains in the Australian Capital Territory
