= Goobarragandra, New South Wales =

Locality in New South Wales, Australia

Goobarragandra, New South Wales is a rural locality in the Snowy Mountains west of Canberra, Australia.

Goobarragandra, New South Wales is located at 35°29′54″S 148°33′04″E. and is a civil parish of Buccleuch County.
