= Darbalara, New South Wales =

Darbalara
- Town
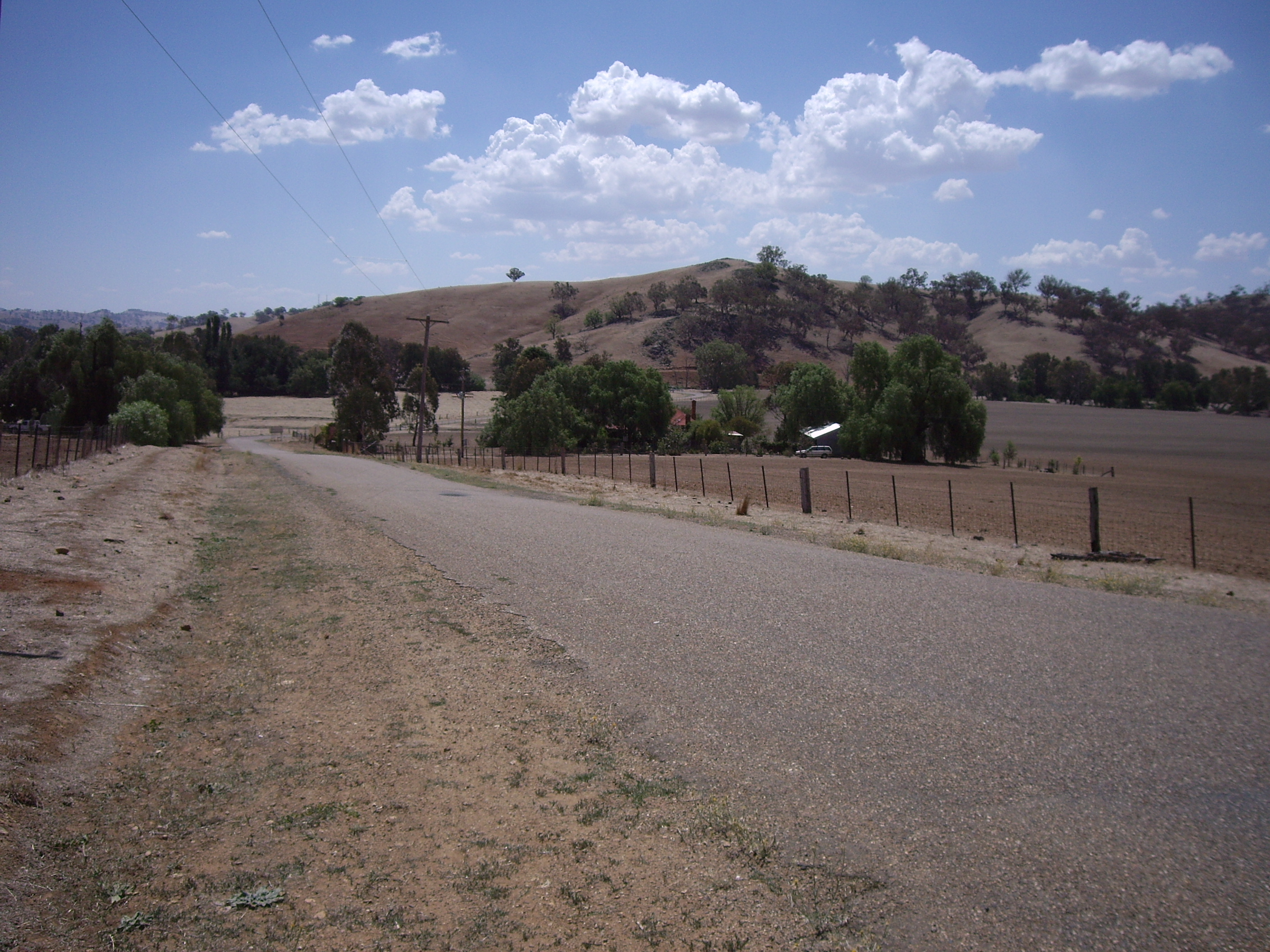
- Darbalara

- Coordinates: 35°02′S 148°13′E
- Country: Australia
- State: New South Wales
- LGA: Cootamundra-Gundagai Regional Council
- Location: 25 km (16 mi) from Gundagai; 25 km (16 mi) from Coolac

Government
  - State electorate: Cootamundra
  - Federal division: Riverina
- Elevation: 303 m (994 ft)

Population
  - Total: 62 (SAL 2021)
- Postcode: 2722
- County: Buccleuch

Darbalara is a rural community on the east bank of the junction of the Murrumbidgee River and Tumut River in the Riverina. It is situated by road, about 25 kilometres north east of Gundagai and 25 kilometres south of Coolac.

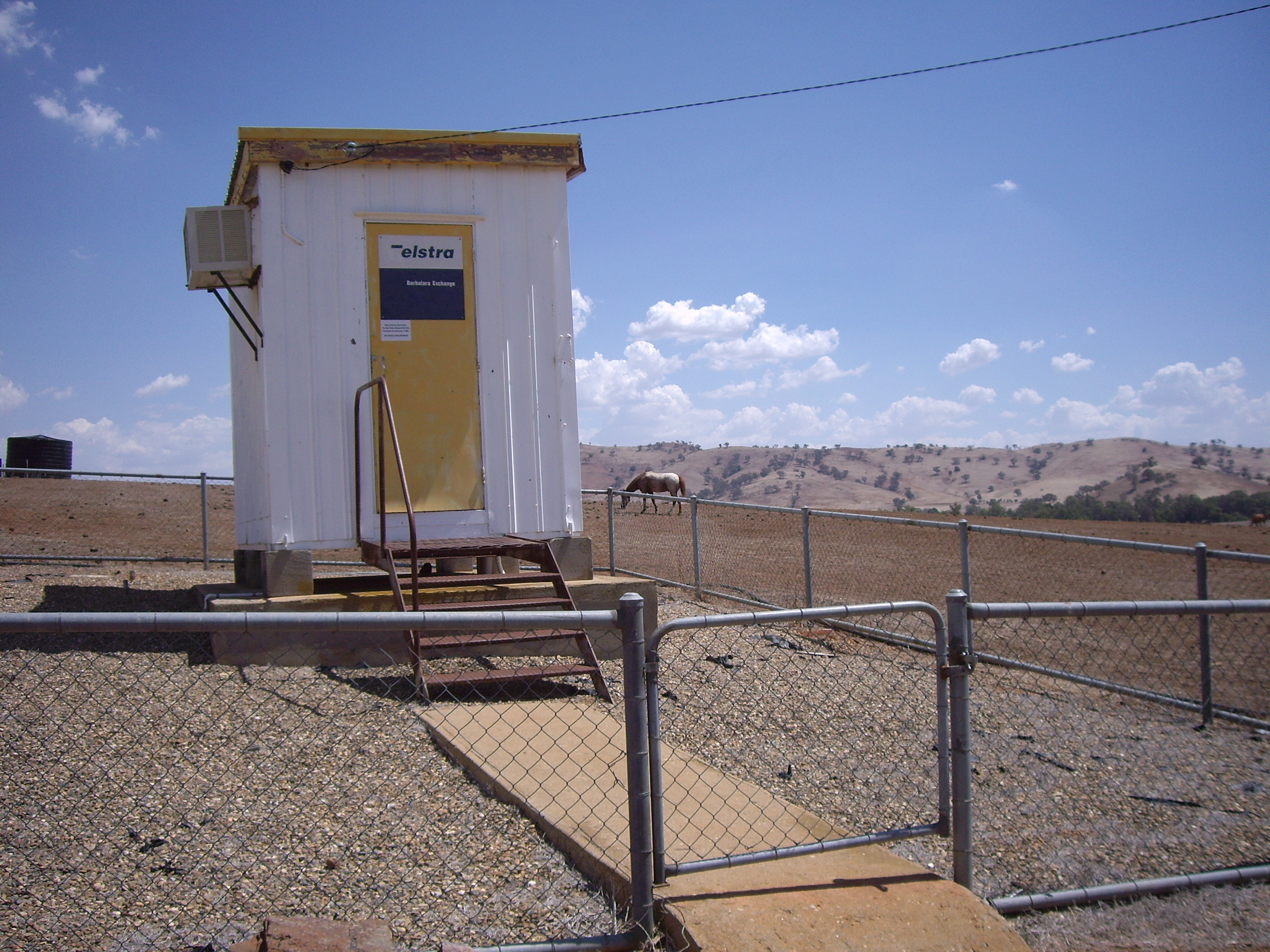
Darbalara telephone exchange

There are no public buildings in Darbalara other than the telephone exchange. A number of properties running sheep and cattle are located in the area.

Darbalara Post Office opened on 25 April 1912 and closed in 1962.

Darbalara is within Darbalara Parish, a civil parish of Buccleuch County, New South Wales.
