= Yarrangobilly =

- Town
- Coordinates: 35°44′54″S 148°30′04″E
- Country: Australia
- State: New South Wales
- LGA: Snowy Valleys Council
- Location: 477 km (296 mi) from Sydney; 176 km (109 mi) from Canberra; 172 km (107 mi) from Wagga Wagga

Government
  - State electorate: Wagga Wagga
  - Federal division: Riverina
- Elevation: 1,067 m (3,501 ft)
- Postcode: 2720
- County: Buccleuch
- Mean max temp: 16.1 °C (61.0 °F)
- Mean min temp: 0.8 °C (33.4 °F)
- Annual rainfall: 1,327.9 mm (52.28 in)

Yarrangobilly, New South Wales is a rural locality in the Snowy Mountains, west of Canberra, Australia, and is also a civil Parish of Buccleuch County.

Yarrangobilly is on the Snowy Mountains Highway, south-east of Tumut, and south-west of Canberra. The parish is situated within the Kosciuszko National Park.

Yarrangobilly is in the Snowy Valleys Council Area.

== Climate ==
Yarrangobilly yields a similar climate to that of Kiandra, albeit of greater continentality due to its more inland location west of the Divide; diurnal range is especially impressive, with a mean daily range of 5.3 to 25.2 °C (41.5 to 77.4 °F) in January. Snowfall is frequent and often heavy.

Climate data for Jounama State Forest (1938–1956, rainfall 1922–1994); 1,067 m AMSL; 35.60° S, 148.45° E
Month	Jan	Feb	Mar	Apr	May	Jun	Jul	Aug	Sep	Oct	Nov	Dec	Year
Mean daily maximum °C (°F)	25.2 (77.4)	24.0 (75.2)	22.0 (71.6)	16.4 (61.5)	12.1 (53.8)	8.4 (47.1)	7.2 (45.0)	8.3 (46.9)	12.3 (54.1)	15.4 (59.7)	18.9 (66.0)	22.9 (73.2)	16.1 (61.0)
Mean daily minimum °C (°F)	5.3 (41.5)	5.3 (41.5)	3.5 (38.3)	0.2 (32.4)	−1.4 (29.5)	−2.0 (28.4)	−3.7 (25.3)	−3.0 (26.6)	−2.0 (28.4)	0.5 (32.9)	2.6 (36.7)	4.0 (39.2)	0.8 (33.4)
Average precipitation mm (inches)	75.2 (2.96)	68.2 (2.69)	93.1 (3.67)	102.1 (4.02)	113.9 (4.48)	140.8 (5.54)	137.9 (5.43)	153.7 (6.05)	117.9 (4.64)	141.9 (5.59)	102.4 (4.03)	80.9 (3.19)	1,327.9 (52.28)
Average precipitation days (≥ 0.2 mm)	5.8	6.0	7.3	8.9	10.0	12.5	13.2	13.4	10.8	11.4	9.3	6.9	115.5
Source: Australian Bureau of Meteorology; Jounama State Forest
