= Goodradigbee River =

River in Australia

Goodradigbee Little River, Murray Creek
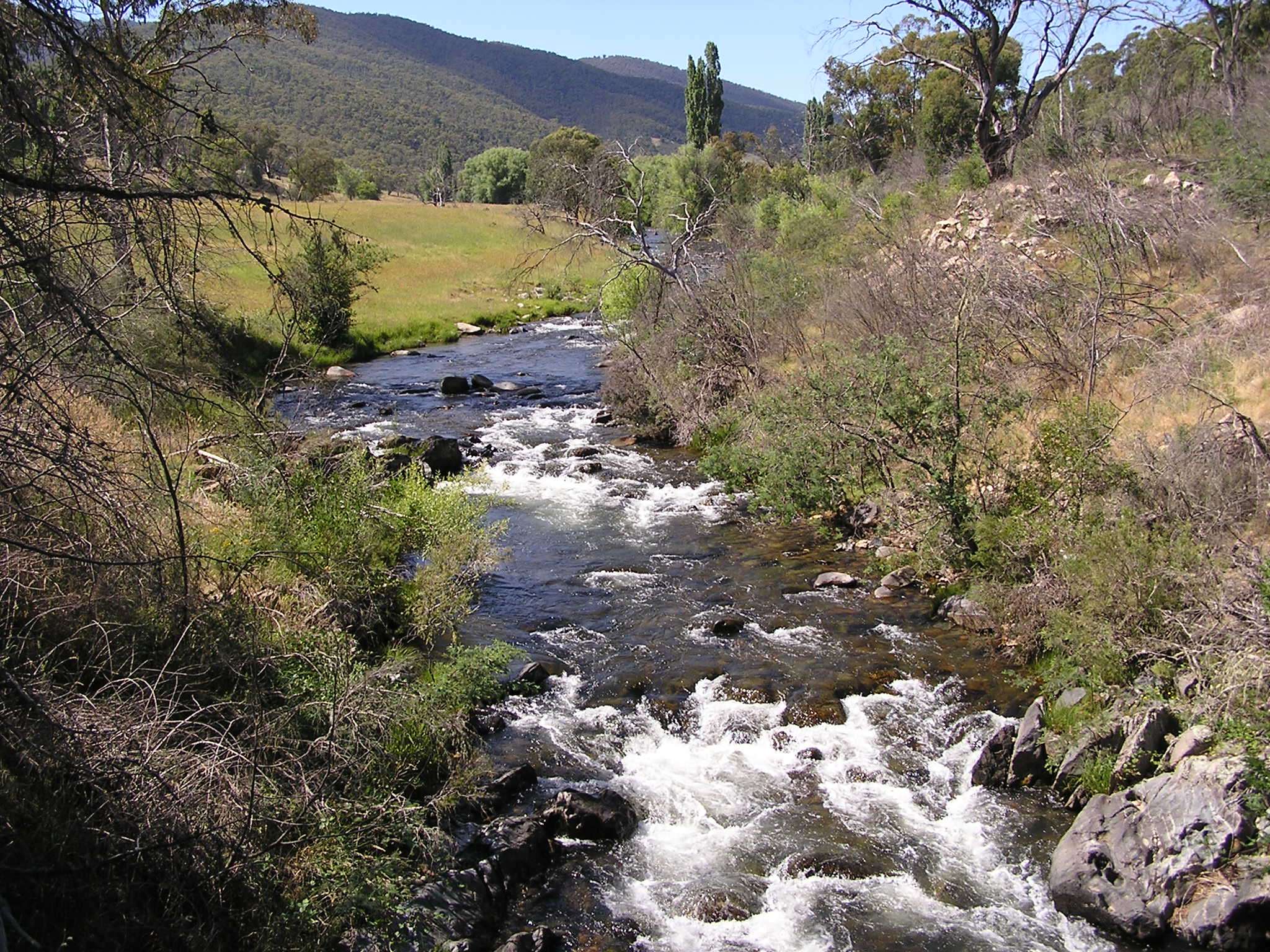
- Goodradigbee River in the Brindabella Valley

- Location of the Goodgradigbee River mouth in New South Wales
- Etymology: meaning "water running over rocks"

Location
- Country: Australia
- State: New South Wales
- Region: Australian Alps (IBRA), Snowy Mountains, Capital Country, Riverina
- LGAs: Tumut, Yass
- Town: Wee Jasper

Physical characteristics
- Source: Snowy Mountains
  - location: near Mount Morgan
  - coordinates: 35°43′27″S 148°47′29″E
  - elevation: 1,650 m (5,410 ft)
- Mouth: confluence with the Murrumbidgee River
  - location: Lake Burrinjuck
  - coordinates: 35°00′S 148°38′E
  - elevation: 345 m (1,132 ft)
- Length: 105 km (65 mi)

Basin features
- River system: Murrumbidgee catchment, Murray-Darling basin
- Tributaries
  - left: Coleman Creek (New South Wales), Bull Flat Creek, Bramina Creek, Horse Creek (New South Wales), Dinnertime Creek, Limestone Creek (New South Wales), Lousy Gully, Micalong Creek, Wee Jasper Creek
  - right: Rolling Grounds Creek, Blackfellows Creek, Brindabella Creek, Flea Creek, Betty Brook Creek, Sugarloaf Creek
- Reservoir: Lake Burrinjuck

Goodradigbee River, a perennial stream that is part of the Murrumbidgee catchment within the Murray-Darling basin, is located in the Snowy Mountains district of New South Wales, Australia.

== Course and features ==
The river rises below Mount Morgan on the northern side of the Snowy Mountains at 1,650 metres (5,410 ft) and flows generally north west, joined by fifteen minor tributaries towards its mouth at the confluence with the Murrumbidgee River at Burrinjuck Dam; dropping 1,300 metres (4,300 ft) over the course of the river's length of 105 kilometres (65 mi).

The majority of the catchment (95%) is forested with the upper catchment within the Kosciuszko National Park. The catchment is 110,100 hectares (272,000 acres) in area. Some water from the upper reaches of the river is diverted into Tantangara Reservoir via an aqueduct, but otherwise the river is not dammed.

In 1968 the National Capital Development Commission considered building a dam at Brindabella Valley for the purpose of sending water into the Cotter River via a tunnel.

The bridge over the Goodradigbee at Wee Jasper was completed in 1896 and is heritage-listed as being an early example of an Allan type timber truss road bridge.

An alternative name for the river was "Little River" and it was officially known as "Goodradigbee (or Little) River", until 22 May 1970.

== See also ==
- List of rivers of Australia § New South Wales
- List of rivers of New South Wales (A–K)
