= Brindabella Range =

Mountain range in Australia

- The Brindabellas
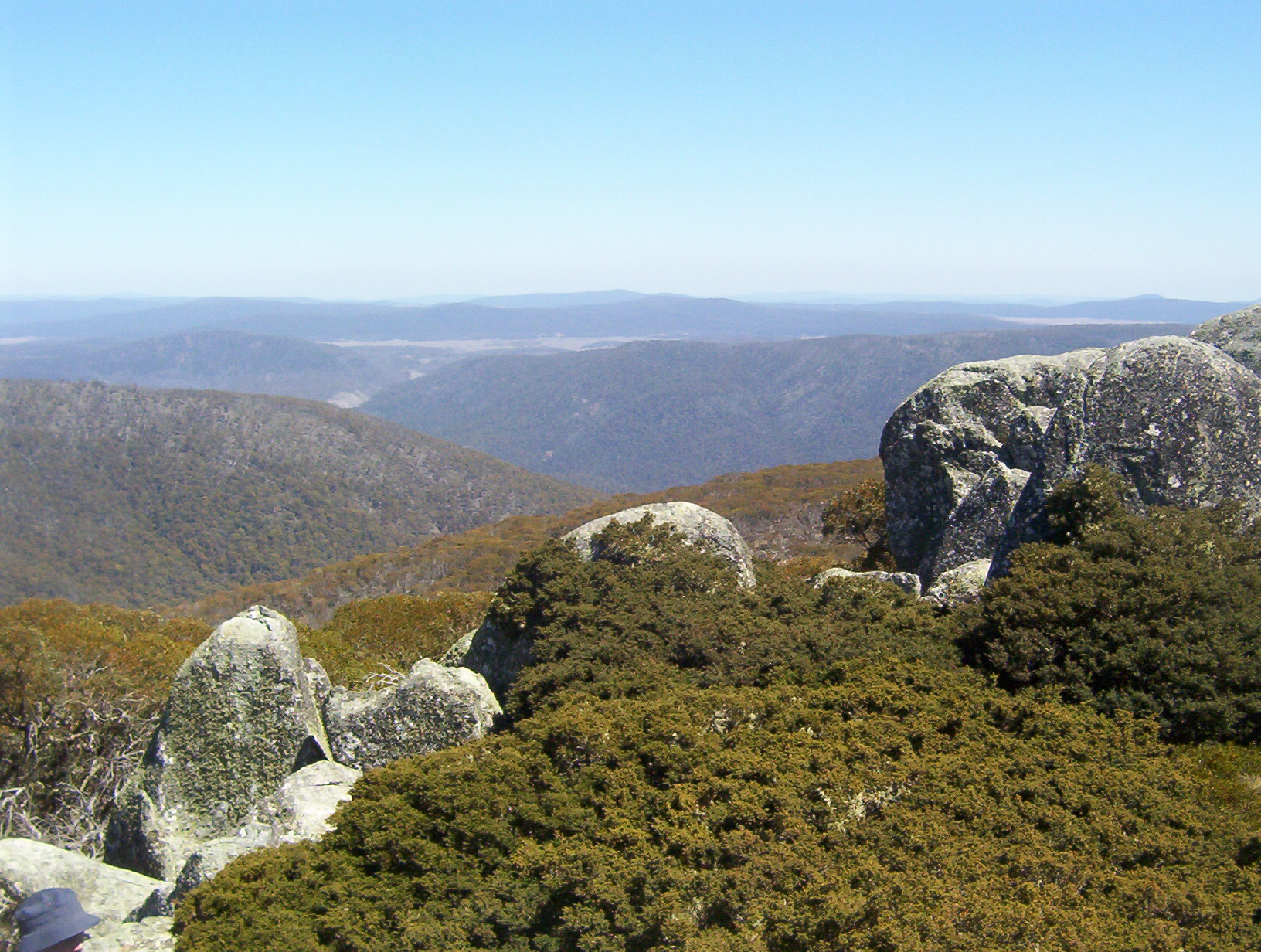
- Mount Gingera, part of the Brindabellas, in the ACT.

Highest point
- Peak: Bimberi Peak
- Elevation: 1,913 m (6,276 ft); AHD
- Coordinates: 35°35′39″S 148°47′21″E

Dimensions
- Length: 100 km (62 mi) N-S
- Width: 5 km (3.1 mi) E-W

Geography
- Location within Australian Capital Territory
- Country: Australia
- State/territory: New South Wales; Australian Capital Territory
- Range coordinates: 35°33′S 148°46′E

The Brindabella Range, commonly called The Brindabellas or The Brindies, is a mountain range in Australia, on a state and territory border of New South Wales and the Australian Capital Territory (ACT). The range rises to the west of Canberra, the capital city of Australia, and includes the Namadgi National Park in the ACT and the Bimberi Nature Reserve and Brindabella National Park in New South Wales. The Brindabellas are visible to the west of Canberra and form an important part of the city's landscape.

== Location and features ==
The Brindabella Range is located in the northern tip of the Australian Alps bioregion, marking the dividing line with the southern tip of the South Eastern Highlands bioregion and the eastern limits of the Riverina. The northern point of the range is Mount Coree, situated 34 kilometres (21 mi) west-northwest of Canberra. From this point the range heads generally south, towards the eastern watershed of the Murrumbidgee River, in a line that marks the western edge of the ACT border with NSW. The most southern point of the range is at Bimberi Gap on the Australian Capital Territory and New South Wales border. The range is located adjacent to the Bag Range, Baldy Range, Codys Ridge, Dingi Dingi Ridge and Webbs Ridge. Scabby Range and Bimberi Range lie to the south.

The geology of the range comprises block-faulted granites and Palaeozoic metamorphic rocks. There are small areas of Tertiary basalt with buried river gravels and lake sediments. The typical characteristics of the range include low-relief high plains with steep margins and slopes and fault aligned river valleys with deep gorges and waterfalls. Soils in the range change with altitude. At lower levels in forests, texture contrast soils are the norm. In the sub-alpine snow gum areas deep gradational soils with moderate amounts of organic matter are common.

Vegetation changes with altitude, aspect, cold air drainage and soil saturation. Tablelands (sites of lower elevations, less than 1,100m) with dry aspects carry red stringybark (Eucalyptus macrorhyncha), white gum (E. rossii), broad-leaved peppermint (E. dives), candlebark (E. rubida) and brittle gum (E. mannifera). Moist sites have alpine ash (E. delegatensis), mountain gum (E. dalrympeana), narrow-leaved peppermint (E. radiata), manna gum (E. viminalis) and brown barrel (E. fastigata), with soft tree ferns (Dicksonia antarctica), blackwood (Acacia melanoxylon), southern sassafras (Atherosperma moschatum) and hazel pomaderris (Pomaderris aspera). Between 1,000–1,500 metres (3,300–4,900 ft) alpine ash and mountain gum dominate and abruptly change to sub-alpine snow gum woodlands, heath, grasslands and bogs between 1,500–1,800 metres (4,900–5,900 ft). Common species include snow grasses, leafy bossiaea, yellow kunzea, alpine pepper and sphagnum bogs, with candle heath and swamp heath. Alpine herbfield and rare feldmark communities are found above the tree line at 1,800 metres (5,900 ft). Common species include prickly snow grass, alpine wallaby grass, silver snow daisy, ribbony grass, white purslane, eyebrights, gentians and buttercups. Most alpine species have a limited range.

=== Peaks ===
The highest mountain within the range is Bimberi Peak at 1,913 metres (6,276 ft), Mount Gingera at 1,857 metres (6,093 ft), Mount Ginini at 1,762 metres (5,781 ft), Mount Franklin at 1,646 metres (5,400 ft), Mount Aggie at 1,421 metres (4,662 ft), Mount Coree at 1,421 metres (4,662 ft), Mount Bramina at 1,392 metres (4,567 ft), Bulls Head at 1,375 metres (4,511 ft), Black Bottle Mountain at 1,356 metres (4,449 ft), Mount Lickhole at 1,188 metres (3,898 ft), and Brindabella Mountain at 972 metres (3,189 ft).

=== Nature reserves and national parks ===
The range straddles both the Brindabella National Park and Kosciuszko National Park, within New South Wales, and the Namadgi National Park, within the ACT and covers an area of 213.6 square kilometres (82.5 sq mi). The Brindabella Valley, in the middle of the range, is 40 kilometres (25 mi) south-west of Canberra and 350 kilometres (220 mi) from Sydney. The valley is on the edge of the Snowy Mountains and the Goodradigbee River flows through the valley.

== History ==
The traditional custodians of the area now known as the Brindabella Range are the Ngunnawal, Walgalu and Djimantan, all Aboriginal Australian peoples.

The Brindabella Valley, located in New South Wales to the west of the range, was first settled by Europeans as a stock outstation for the Yarralumla station in the 1830s, with the first land grant made in 1849. Gold was found in 1860 and mined from the 1880s. In 1887 the Brindabella Gold Mining Company was formed and mining continued until 1910. The valley is now an agricultural area and consists of a number of small cattle farms including the heritage-listed Brindabella Station, the childhood home of Miles Franklin, an early 20th-century Australian author, who wrote an autobiographical work, Childhood at Brindabella, which told of her early life in the valley.

=== Etymology ===
The name brindabella is said to mean "two kangaroo rats" in one of the local Aboriginal languages. However, another account states that "Brindy brindy" was a local term meaning water running over rocks and bella was added by the Europeans from the Italian bella vista, meaning "beautiful view".

== Snow country ==
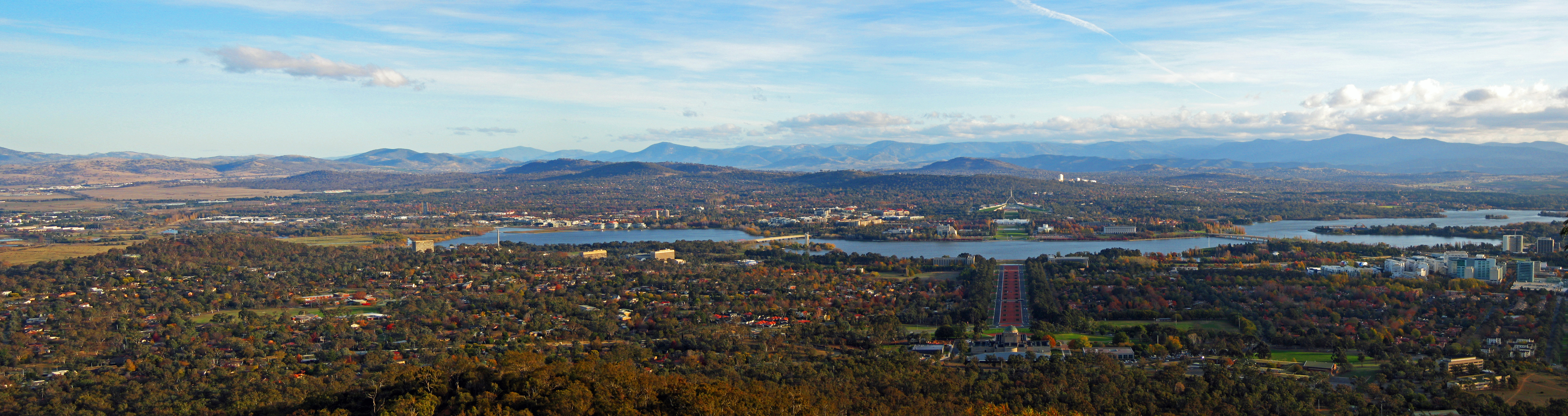
The city of Canberra looking towards the Brindabella Range.

The most northerly ski fields in Australia are located in the Brindabella Range and include the Namadgi National Park in the ACT and Bimberi Nature Reserve and Brindabella National Park in New South Wales. The highest mountain in the ACT is Bimberi Peak, which lies above the treeline at 1,912 metres (6,273 ft), at the northern edge of the Snowy Mountains.

A ski chalet was constructed at Mount Franklin in 1938 to service the Canberra Alpine Club. Ski runs were cleared and ski tows were improvised. The chalet later operated as a museum before being destroyed in the 2003 Canberra bushfires. A new shelter designed and built by University of Adelaide students opened in 2008. Today, cross country skiing is possible in the area, when conditions allow. Cross Country skiing is also practised at Mount Gingera, which rises above the city of Canberra to an elevation of 1,857 metres (6,093 ft), and is the most prominent snow-covered peak above the city.

Snow play is available at Corin Forest, near Canberra, at an elevation of 1,200 metres (3,900 ft). A development plan was drafted following the 2003 bushfires which would see three 600 metres (2,000 ft) chairlifts installed together with snowmaking facilities and accommodation at this site.

== Climate ==
The Brindabellas have a subtropical highland climate (Köppen: Cfb) at lower elevations. At higher altitudes, the climate becomes cooler and wetter; transitioning to a subalpine highland climate, a hemiaustral climate or a continental subalpine climate (Köppen: Cfc/Dfb/Dfc). Here are climate tables for selected sites at increasing elevation:

Climate data for Tidbinbilla Nature Reserve (35.44°S 148.94°E, 700 m (2,300 ft) m AMSL) (1966-2012 data)
Month	Jan	Feb	Mar	Apr	May	Jun	Jul	Aug	Sep	Oct	Nov	Dec	Year
Record high °C (°F)	39.1 (102.4)	39.0 (102.2)	36.0 (96.8)	29.3 (84.7)	23.3 (73.9)	19.0 (66.2)	17.5 (63.5)	22.2 (72.0)	25.0 (77.0)	31.0 (87.8)	37.0 (98.6)	37.5 (99.5)	39.1 (102.4)
Mean daily maximum °C (°F)	27.0 (80.6)	26.2 (79.2)	23.5 (74.3)	19.1 (66.4)	15.2 (59.4)	11.7 (53.1)	10.9 (51.6)	12.6 (54.7)	15.5 (59.9)	18.8 (65.8)	22.0 (71.6)	24.7 (76.5)	18.9 (66.0)
Mean daily minimum °C (°F)	12.4 (54.3)	12.5 (54.5)	10.0 (50.0)	6.6 (43.9)	3.6 (38.5)	1.4 (34.5)	0.2 (32.4)	1.1 (34.0)	3.8 (38.8)	5.9 (42.6)	8.9 (48.0)	10.8 (51.4)	6.4 (43.5)
Record low °C (°F)	−0.5 (31.1)	2.5 (36.5)	−1.0 (30.2)	−7.0 (19.4)	−5.5 (22.1)	−10.0 (14.0)	−10.0 (14.0)	−7.0 (19.4)	−4.5 (23.9)	−3.8 (25.2)	−1.2 (29.8)	1.0 (33.8)	−10.0 (14.0)
Average precipitation mm (inches)	81.8 (3.22)	73.7 (2.90)	67.6 (2.66)	63.1 (2.48)	65.3 (2.57)	65.1 (2.56)	83.8 (3.30)	92.7 (3.65)	90.2 (3.55)	87.7 (3.45)	91.2 (3.59)	69.1 (2.72)	930.7 (36.64)
Average precipitation days (≥ 0.2 mm)	8.1	7.9	7.9	7.9	9.9	11.5	11.8	12.8	12.0	10.9	11.0	8.7	120.4
Source: Bureau of Meteorology (1966-2012 data)

Climate data for Orroral Valley (STADAN) (35.63°S 148.95°E, 925 m (3,035 ft) m AMSL) (1967-1981 data)
Month	Jan	Feb	Mar	Apr	May	Jun	Jul	Aug	Sep	Oct	Nov	Dec	Year
Record high °C (°F)	38.3 (100.9)	37.2 (99.0)	35.0 (95.0)	27.8 (82.0)	22.2 (72.0)	16.7 (62.1)	17.7 (63.9)	21.3 (70.3)	25.8 (78.4)	28.0 (82.4)	33.8 (92.8)	34.5 (94.1)	38.3 (100.9)
Mean daily maximum °C (°F)	25.2 (77.4)	24.9 (76.8)	21.8 (71.2)	17.4 (63.3)	13.2 (55.8)	10.3 (50.5)	9.5 (49.1)	11.1 (52.0)	13.7 (56.7)	17.2 (63.0)	19.9 (67.8)	23.4 (74.1)	17.3 (63.1)
Mean daily minimum °C (°F)	10.3 (50.5)	10.4 (50.7)	8.1 (46.6)	4.1 (39.4)	1.4 (34.5)	−1.3 (29.7)	−2.2 (28.0)	−0.8 (30.6)	1.4 (34.5)	4.1 (39.4)	6.4 (43.5)	8.3 (46.9)	4.2 (39.6)
Record low °C (°F)	−1.0 (30.2)	−0.6 (30.9)	−3.0 (26.6)	−5.5 (22.1)	−7.5 (18.5)	−9.0 (15.8)	−11.0 (12.2)	−9.5 (14.9)	−7.8 (18.0)	−5.5 (22.1)	−3.7 (25.3)	−1.0 (30.2)	−11.0 (12.2)
Average precipitation mm (inches)	85.9 (3.38)	77.8 (3.06)	76.9 (3.03)	72.4 (2.85)	68.2 (2.69)	47.1 (1.85)	53.0 (2.09)	78.7 (3.10)	81.0 (3.19)	90.3 (3.56)	77.6 (3.06)	54.7 (2.15)	863.0 (33.98)
Average precipitation days (≥ 0.2 mm)	9.0	8.8	9.5	8.7	10.7	10.2	9.9	13.1	13.2	11.8	11.2	8.3	124.4
Source: Bureau of Meteorology (1968-1985 data)

Climate data for Honeysuckle Creek (35.58°S 148.98°E, 1,116 m (3,661 ft) m AMSL) (1967-1981 data)
Month	Jan	Feb	Mar	Apr	May	Jun	Jul	Aug	Sep	Oct	Nov	Dec	Year
Record high °C (°F)	36.1 (97.0)	34.7 (94.5)	30.0 (86.0)	26.1 (79.0)	20.0 (68.0)	17.2 (63.0)	16.2 (61.2)	19.2 (66.6)	23.2 (73.8)	26.1 (79.0)	32.2 (90.0)	35.0 (95.0)	36.1 (97.0)
Mean daily maximum °C (°F)	23.3 (73.9)	23.0 (73.4)	19.9 (67.8)	15.9 (60.6)	11.4 (52.5)	8.5 (47.3)	7.9 (46.2)	9.1 (48.4)	12.1 (53.8)	15.8 (60.4)	18.3 (64.9)	22.1 (71.8)	15.6 (60.1)
Mean daily minimum °C (°F)	10.7 (51.3)	11.0 (51.8)	8.7 (47.7)	5.2 (41.4)	2.5 (36.5)	−0.1 (31.8)	−1.1 (30.0)	−0.2 (31.6)	1.5 (34.7)	4.5 (40.1)	6.4 (43.5)	8.6 (47.5)	4.8 (40.6)
Record low °C (°F)	1.4 (34.5)	1.1 (34.0)	−1.0 (30.2)	−4.0 (24.8)	−6.1 (21.0)	−7.0 (19.4)	−7.8 (18.0)	−11.1 (12.0)	−6.1 (21.0)	−6.5 (20.3)	−3.3 (26.1)	−0.6 (30.9)	−11.1 (12.0)
Average precipitation mm (inches)	93.0 (3.66)	104.7 (4.12)	78.2 (3.08)	88.4 (3.48)	74.6 (2.94)	58.9 (2.32)	57.9 (2.28)	92.9 (3.66)	86.9 (3.42)	112.0 (4.41)	85.2 (3.35)	67.3 (2.65)	1,001 (39.41)
Average precipitation days (≥ 0.2 mm)	11.4	10.9	11.1	9.4	11.4	11.3	10.9	13.3	12.7	13.5	12.0	8.4	136.3
Source: Bureau of Meteorology (1967-1981 data)

Climate data for Mount Ginini (35.53°S 148.77°E, 1,760 m (5,770 ft) m AMSL) (2004-2025 data)
Month	Jan	Feb	Mar	Apr	May	Jun	Jul	Aug	Sep	Oct	Nov	Dec	Year
Record high °C (°F)	33.2 (91.8)	31.1 (88.0)	26.6 (79.9)	22.4 (72.3)	16.0 (60.8)	12.6 (54.7)	10.2 (50.4)	16.0 (60.8)	19.9 (67.8)	23.3 (73.9)	28.1 (82.6)	30.7 (87.3)	33.2 (91.8)
Mean daily maximum °C (°F)	20.7 (69.3)	18.9 (66.0)	16.3 (61.3)	11.8 (53.2)	7.4 (45.3)	3.7 (38.7)	2.6 (36.7)	4.2 (39.6)	8.6 (47.5)	12.5 (54.5)	15.2 (59.4)	17.9 (64.2)	11.6 (52.9)
Mean daily minimum °C (°F)	10.0 (50.0)	8.8 (47.8)	7.4 (45.3)	4.1 (39.4)	1.0 (33.8)	−1.1 (30.0)	−2.4 (27.7)	−1.8 (28.8)	0.3 (32.5)	3.0 (37.4)	5.6 (42.1)	7.5 (45.5)	3.5 (38.3)
Record low °C (°F)	−1.3 (29.7)	−3.1 (26.4)	−2.9 (26.8)	−5.0 (23.0)	−6.5 (20.3)	−8.5 (16.7)	−8.0 (17.6)	−8.2 (17.2)	−7.4 (18.7)	−5.5 (22.1)	−6.0 (21.2)	−4.0 (24.8)	−8.5 (16.7)
Average precipitation mm (inches)	94.7 (3.73)	96.4 (3.80)	91.8 (3.61)	65.4 (2.57)	65.7 (2.59)	85.4 (3.36)	88.7 (3.49)	95.8 (3.77)	86.0 (3.39)	87.0 (3.43)	119.7 (4.71)	111.8 (4.40)	1,091.5 (42.97)
Average precipitation days (≥ 0.2 mm)	11.0	11.9	12.5	9.4	10.4	12.7	15.4	14.4	11.8	11.2	12.3	11.7	144.7
Source: Bureau of Meteorology (2004-2025 data)

== Gallery ==
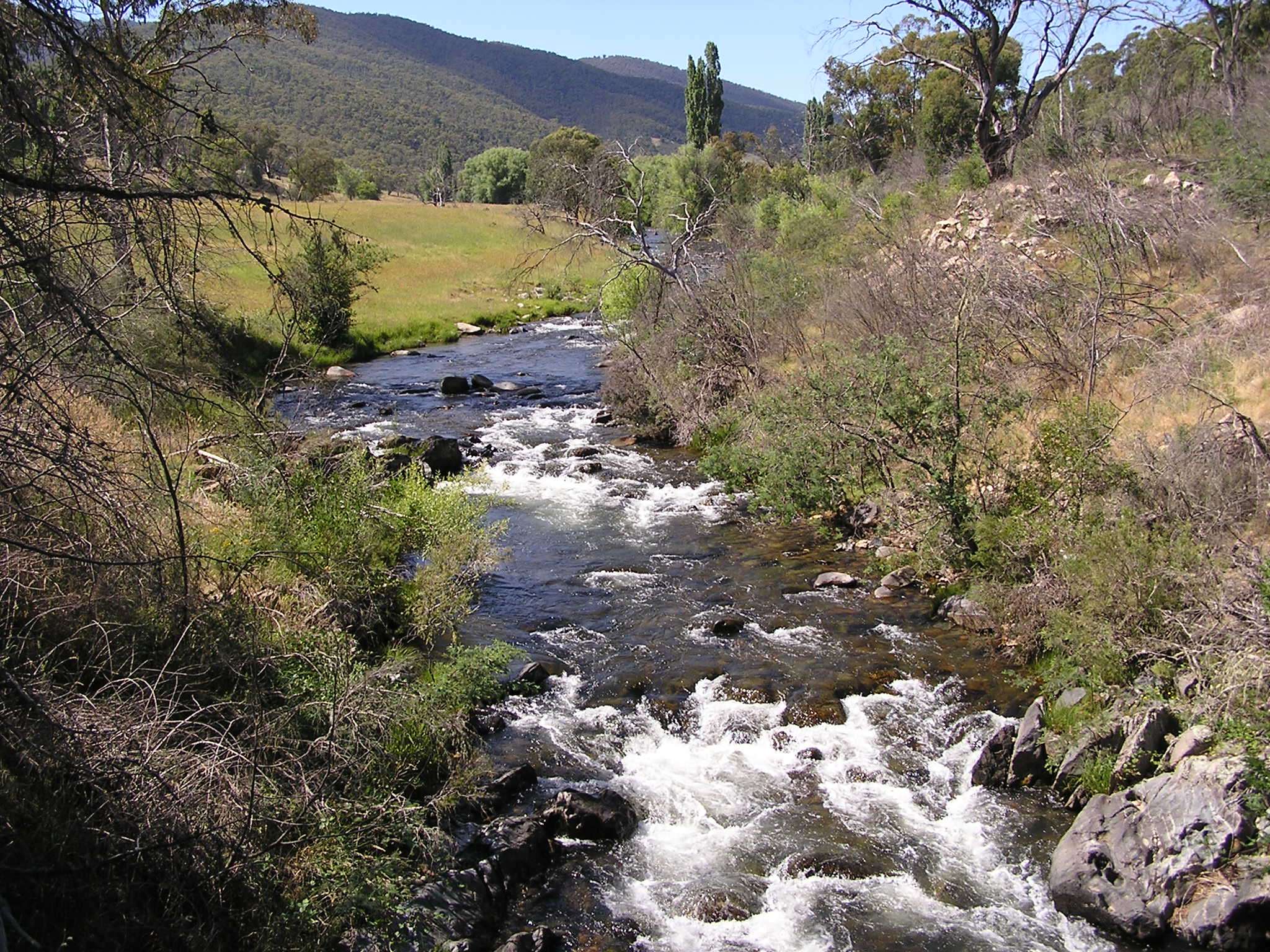
Goodradigbee River in the Brindabella valley.

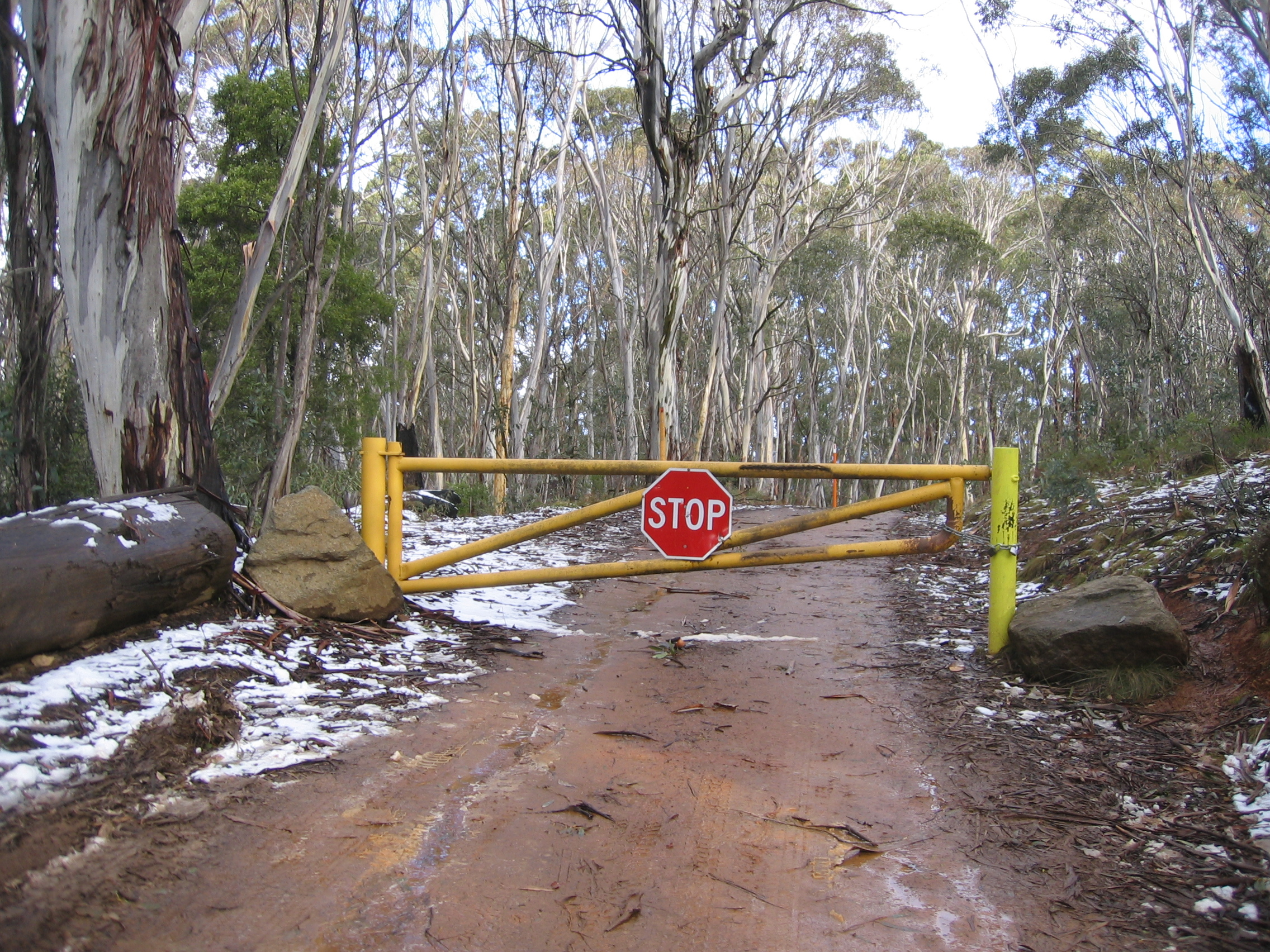
The road to Mount Franklin, ACT, was built by the Canberra Alpine Club in the 1930s.

== See also ==
- Skiing in Australia
- Skiing in New South Wales
- List of mountains in Australia
