= Brindabella Station =

Station in New South Wales, Australia

Coordinates: 35.4093°S 148.7375°E

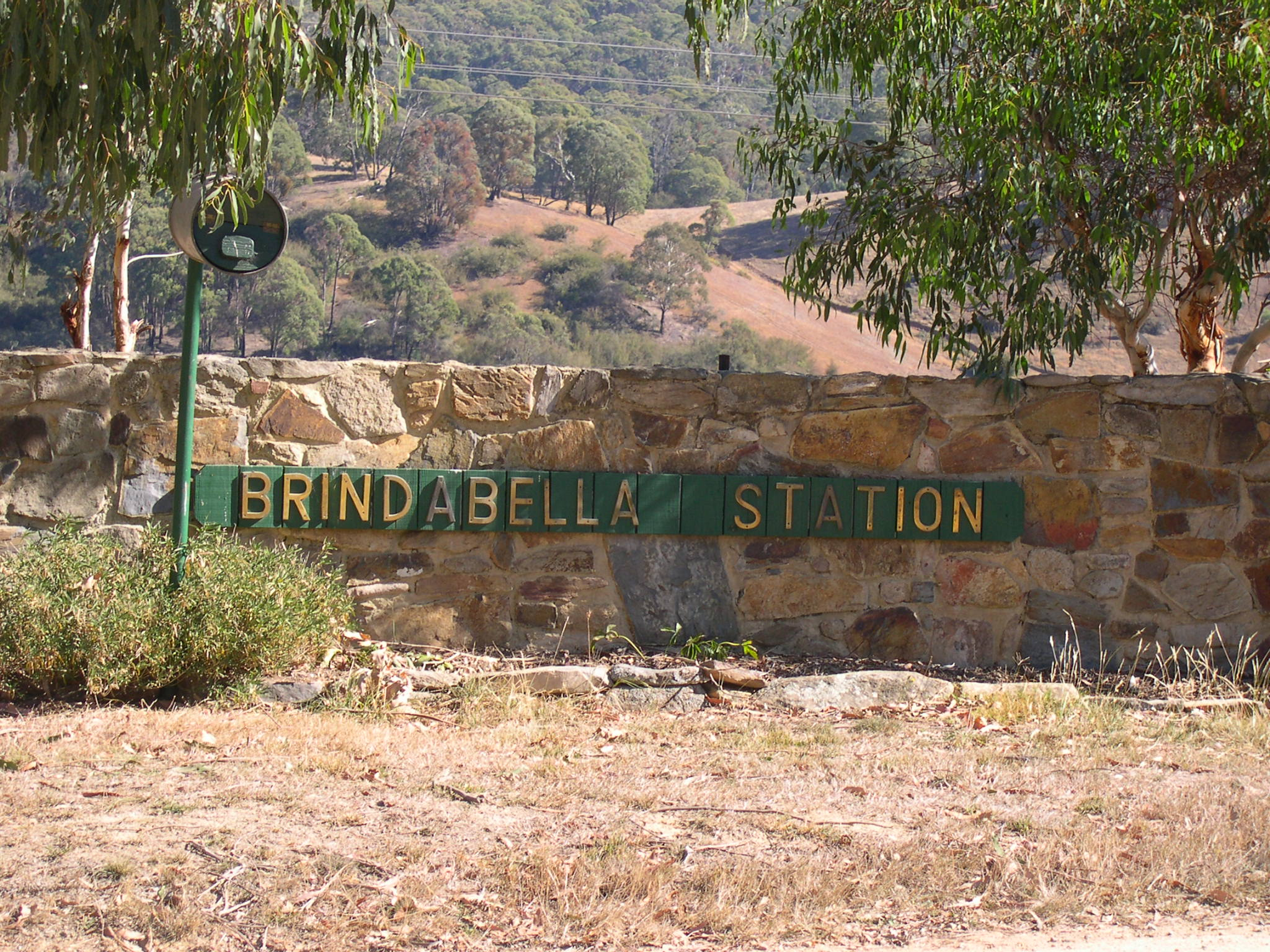
Entrance to Brindabella Station

Brindabella Station, sometimes referred to as the Brindabella Homestead, is located within the Brindabella Ranges in the Australian state of New South Wales. It was the childhood home of the Australian author Miles Franklin. Brindabella was first settled by the Franklin family in 1846, but they were unable to settle permanently until 1861 due to Aboriginal settlement in the region. In the 20th century, the station was a favourite fishing spot of Malcolm Fraser, Prime Minister of Australia 1975–1983.
