= Brindabella National Park =

National park in New South Wales, Australia

- IUCN category II (national park)
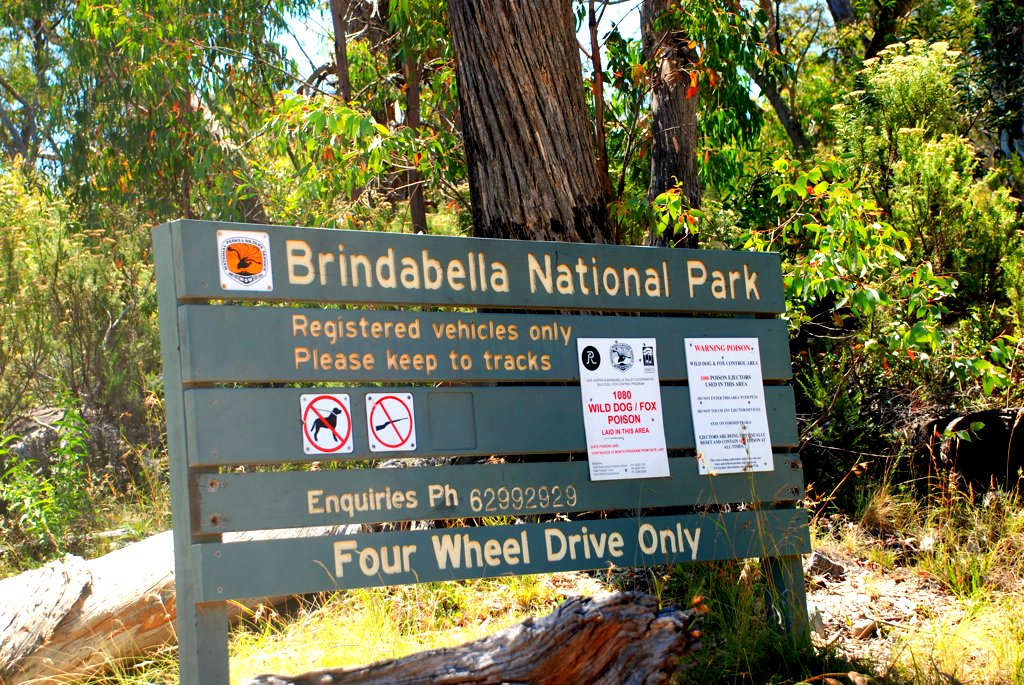
- Brindabella National Park sign, January 2009

- Location within New South Wales
- Location: New South Wales
- Nearest city: Canberra
- Coordinates: 35°13′54″S 148°46′44″E
- Area: 18,454 ha (71.25 sq mi)
- Established: 4 April 1996
- Governing body: NSW National Parks & Wildlife Service
- Website: http://www.nationalparks.nsw.gov.au/visit-a-park/parks/Brindabella-National-Park

Brindabella National Park is an 18,454-hectare (45,600-acre) national park in New South Wales, Australia, that is located approximately 267 kilometres (166 mi) southwest of Sydney central business district in the Brindabella Range. Much of the eastern boundary of the national park forms part of the western border of the Australian Capital Territory with New South Wales.

On 7 November 2008, the park was registered on the Australian National Heritage List as one of eleven areas constituting the Australian Alps National Parks and Reserves.

== See also ==
- Protected areas of New South Wales
