= Tributaries of the Murrumbidgee River =

The Murrumbidgee River is a major river in New South Wales, Australia, with approximately ninety named tributaries in total; including 24 rivers, and numerous creeks and gullies.

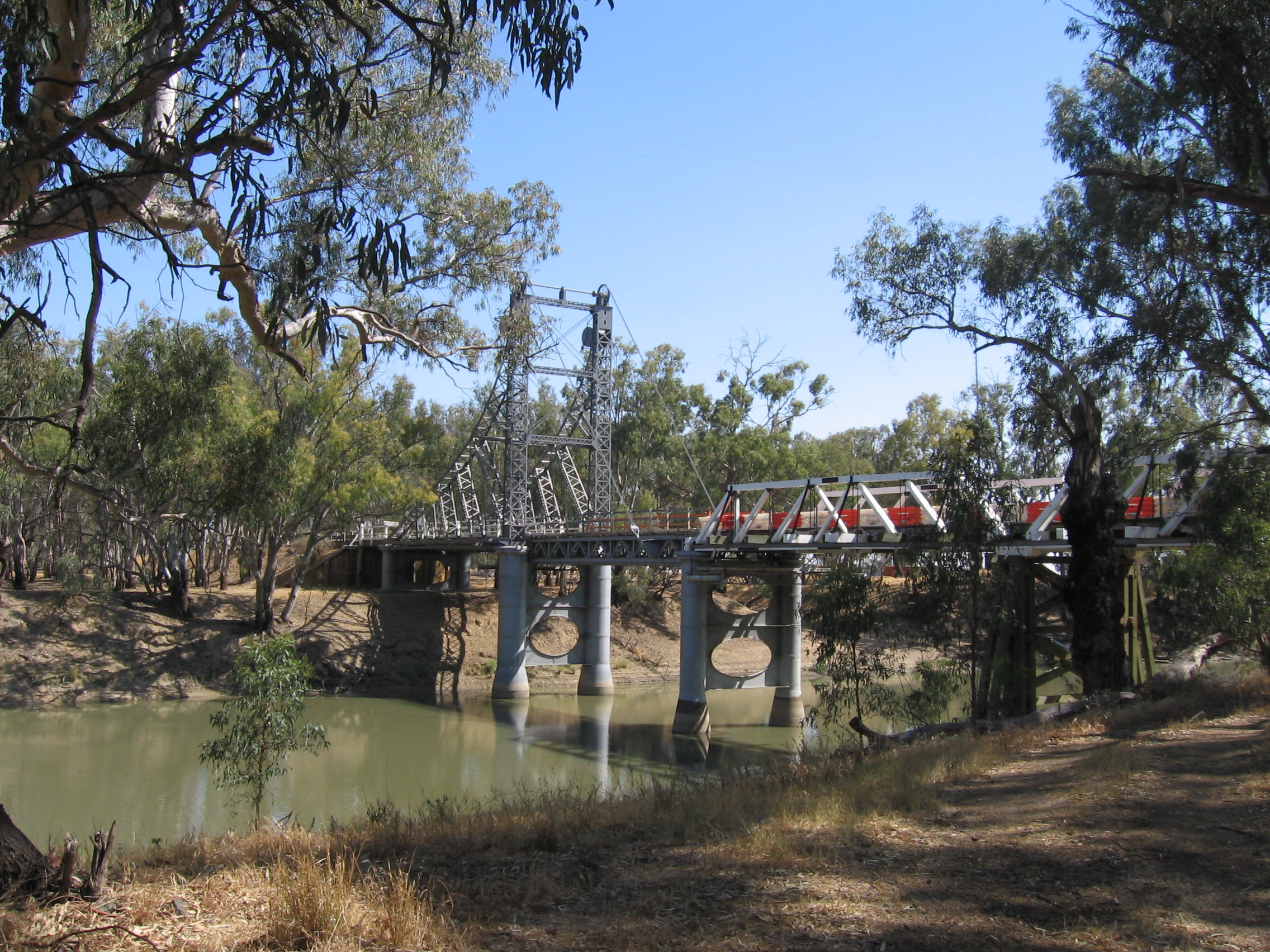
Bridge over the Murrumbidgee at Carrathool, New South Wales.

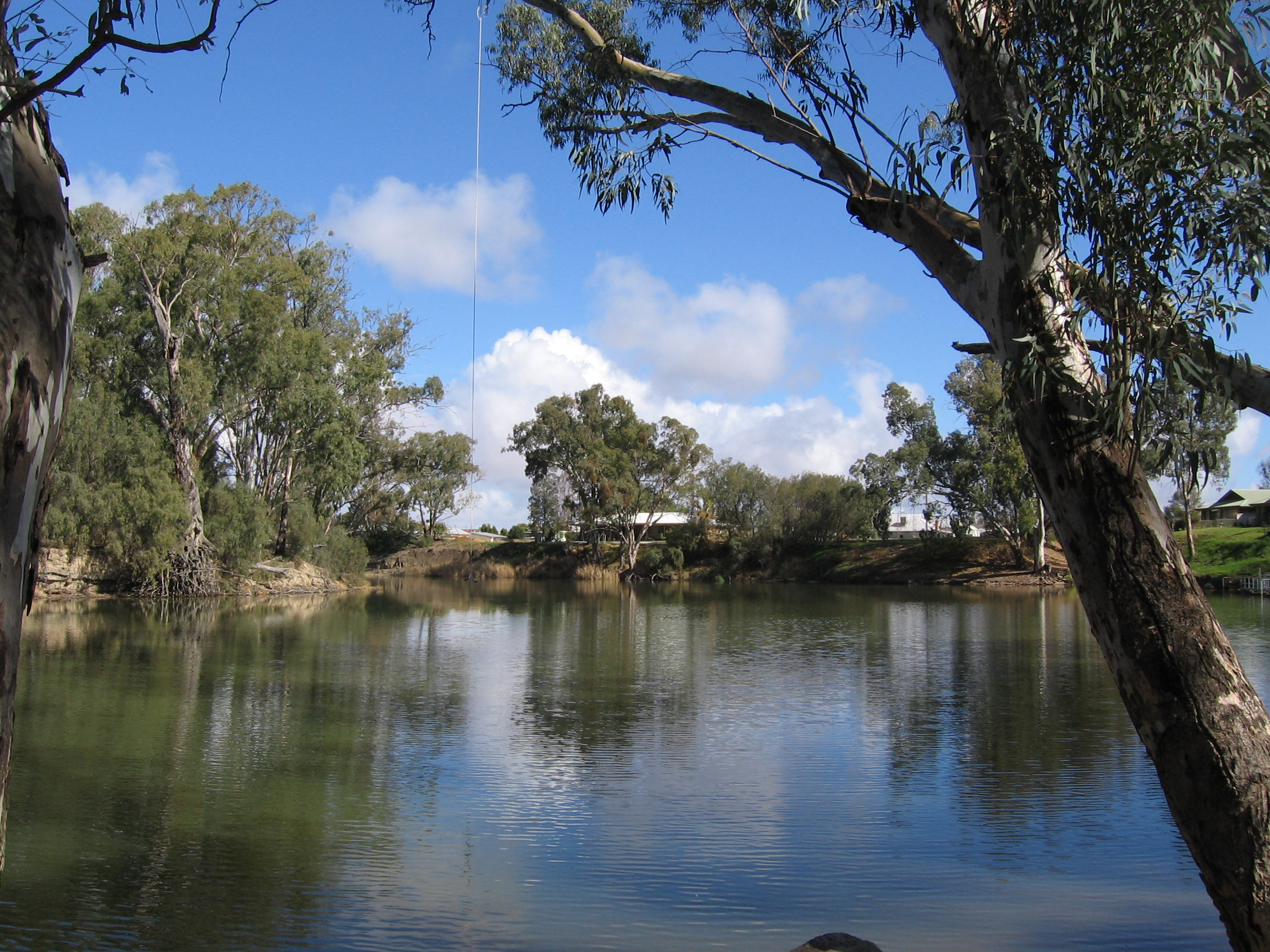
Swimming hole on the Murrumbidgee at Hay, New South Wales

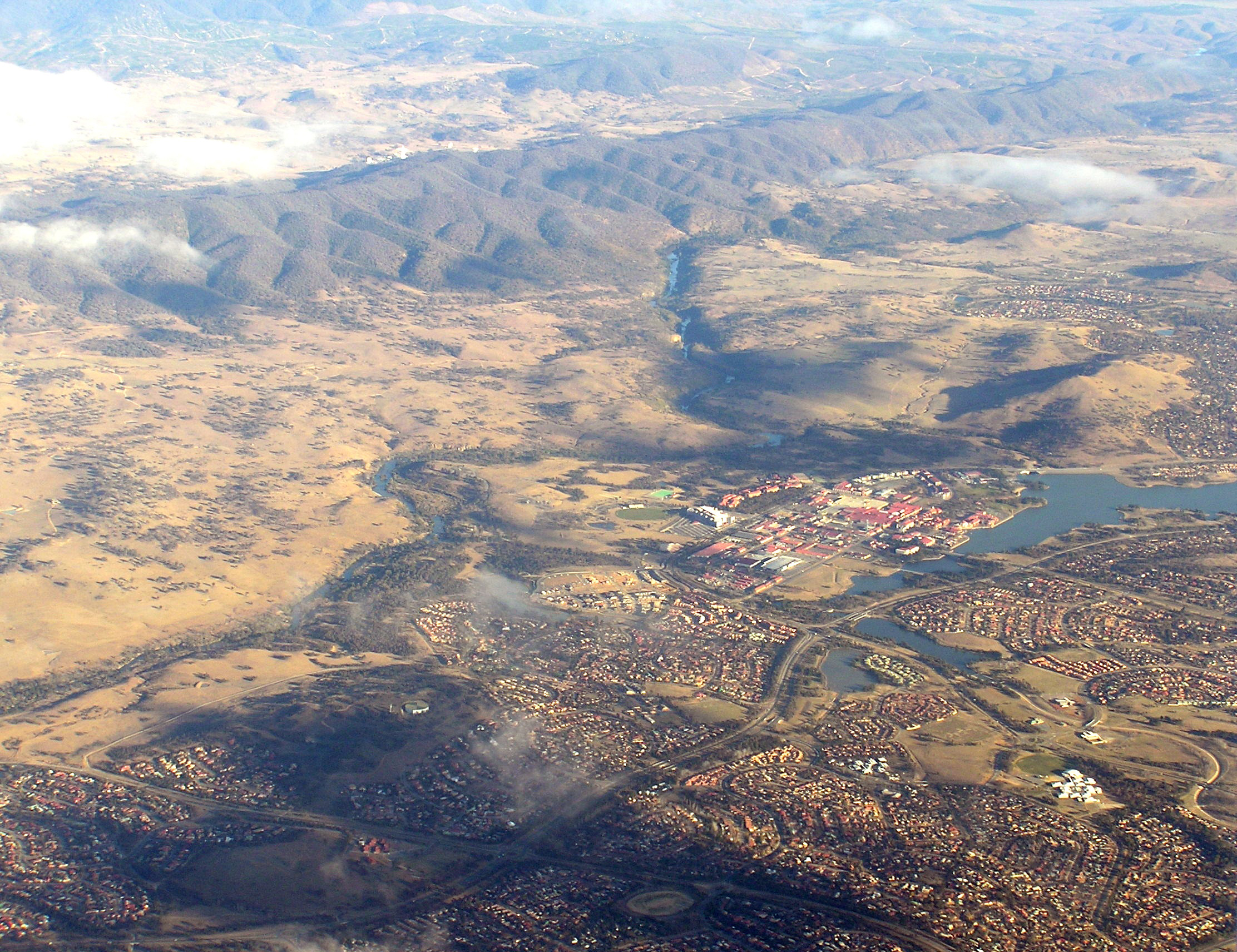
Aerial photo of Tuggeranong Town Centre, with Murrumbidgee River behind, Bullen Range is behind and Tidbinbilla Tracking Station is visible too.

The ordering of the basin, from source to mouth, is:

Rivers of the Murrumbidgee River basin
| Catchment river | | | | | | | Elevation at confluence | River mouth | Coordinates | River length |
| | Tributary | | | | | | Elevation at confluence | River mouth | Coordinates | River length |
| | | Tributary | | | | | Elevation at confluence | River mouth | Coordinates | River length |
| | | | Tributary | | | | Elevation at confluence | River mouth | Coordinates | River length |
| | | | | Tributary | | | Elevation at confluence | River mouth | Coordinates | River length |
| | | | | | Tributary | | Elevation at confluence | River mouth | Coordinates | River length |
| | | | | | | Tributary | Elevation at confluence | River mouth | Coordinates | River length |
|---|---|---|---|---|---|---|---|---|---|---|
| Murrumbidgee River | | | | | | | 55 m (180 ft) | Murray | 34°43′43″S 143°13′8″E | ~900 km (559 mi) |
| | Mc Phersons Creek | | | | | | 1,329 m (4,360 ft) | Murrumbidgee | | 8 km (5 mi) |
| | Dairymans Creek | | | | | | 1,287 m (4,222 ft) | Murrumbidgee | | 5 km (3 mi) |
| | Tantangara Creek | | | | | | 1,257 m (4,124 ft) | Murrumbidgee | | 16 km (10 mi) |
| | | Boggy Plain Creek | | | | | 1,350 m (4,429 ft) | Tantangara | | 8 km (5 mi) |
| | Nungar Creek | | | | | | 1,220 m (4,003 ft) | Murrumbidgee | | 27 km (17 mi) |
| | Mosquito Creek | | | | | | 1,215 m (3,986 ft) | Murrumbidgee | | 15 km (9 mi) |
| | Paytens Creek | | | | | | 1,170 m (3,839 ft) | Murrumbidgee | | 8 km (5 mi) |
| | Farm Creek | | | | | | 1,149 m (3,770 ft) | Murrumbidgee | | 9 km (6 mi) |
| | Duncan Creek | | | | | | 1,051 m (3,448 ft) | Murrumbidgee | | 6 km (4 mi) |
| | Dog Plain Creek | | | | | | 1,033 m (3,389 ft) | Murrumbidgee | | 6 km (4 mi) |
| | Boundary Creek | | | | | | 1,021 m (3,350 ft) | Murrumbidgee | | 7 km (4 mi) |
| | Goorudee Rivulet | | | | | | 967 m (3,173 ft) | Murrumbidgee | | 23 km (14 mi) |
| | Long Corner Creek | | | | | | 965 m (3,166 ft) | Murrumbidgee | | 13 km (8 mi) |
| | Jones Creek | | | | | | 952 m (3,123 ft) | Murrumbidgee | | 12 km (7 mi) |
| | Back Creek | | | | | | 913 m (2,995 ft) | Murrumbidgee | | 19 km (12 mi) |
| | Bennetts Creek | | | | | | 846 m (2,776 ft) | Murrumbidgee | | 7 km (4 mi) |
| | Bulga Creek | | | | | | 809 m (2,654 ft) | Murrumbidgee | | 9 km (6 mi) |
| | Spring Creek | | | | | | 772 m (2,533 ft) | Murrumbidgee | | 9 km (6 mi) |
| | Slacks Creek | | | | | | 770 m (2,526 ft) | Murrumbidgee | | 23 km (14 mi) |
| | Bridle Creek | | | | | | 770 m (2,526 ft) | Murrumbidgee | | 17 km (11 mi) |
| | | Wambrook Creek | | | | | 791 m (2,595 ft) | Bridle | | 20 km (12 mi) |
| | | Peak Creek | | | | | 783 m (2,569 ft) | Bridle | | 14 km (9 mi) |
| | Pilot Creek | | | | | | 736 m (2,415 ft) | Murrumbidgee | | 8 km (5 mi) |
| | Numeralla River | | | | | | 706 m (2,316 ft) | Murrumbidgee | 36°3′56″S 149°9′1″E | 94 km (58 mi) |
| | | Grannys Flat Creek | | | | | 848 m (2,782 ft) | Numeralla | 36°23′51″S 149°18′13″E | 11 km (7 mi) |
| | | | Tom Groggins Creek | | | | 859 m (2,818 ft) | Grannys Flat | 36°23′43″S 149°17′18″E | 14 km (9 mi) |
| | | | | Jarvis Creek | | | 883 m (2,897 ft) | Tom Groggins | 36°24′6″S 149°17′12″E | 6 km (4 mi) |
| | | Dangelong Creek | | | | | 803 m (2,635 ft) | Numeralla | 36°20′54″S 149°18′6″E | 6 km (4 mi) |
| | | Halls Creek | | | | | 778 m (2,552 ft) | Numeralla | 36°18′55″S 149°17′54″E | 3 km (2 mi) |
| | | Stony Creek | | | | | 759 m (2,490 ft) | Numeralla | 36°16′1″S 149°18′9″E | 4 km (2 mi) |
| | | Kybeyan River | | | | | 745 m (2,444 ft) | Numeralla | 36°13′13″S 149°21′25″E | 36 km (22 mi) |
| | | | Kybeyan Creek | | | | 1,020 m (3,346 ft) | Kybeyan R. | 36°20′59″S 149°25′16″E | 7 km (4 mi) |
| | | | Shannon Creek | | | | 1,004 m (3,294 ft) | Kybeyan R. | 36°20′24″S 149°24′36″E | 4 km (2 mi) |
| | | | Kydra Creek | | | | 1,003 m (3,291 ft) | Kybeyan R. | 36°18′26″S 149°24′46″E | 12 km (7 mi) |
| | | Big Badja River | | | | | 735 m (2,411 ft) | Numeralla | 36°10′27″S 149°20′52″E | 94 km (58 mi) |
| | | Cooma Creek | | | | | 714 m (2,343 ft) | Numeralla | 36°6′20″S 149°11′16″E | 42 km (26 mi) |
| | Bredbo River | | | | | | | Murrumbidgee | | |
| | | Strike-a-Light River | | | | | | Bredbo | | |
| | Gudgenby River | | | | | | | Murrumbidgee | | |
| | | Naas River | | | | | | Gudgenby | | |
| | | Orroral River | | | | | | Gudgenby | | |
| | Cotter River | | | | | | | Murrumbidgee | | |
| | | Paddys River | | | | | | Cotter | | |
| | | | Tidbinbilla River | | | | | Paddys | | |
| | | | Gibraltar Creek | | | | | Paddys | | |
| | Molonglo River | | | | | | | Murrumbidgee | | |
| | | Jerrabomberra Creek | | | | | | Molonglo | | |
| | | Sullivans Creek | | | | | | Molonglo | | |
| | | Queanbeyan River | | | | | | Molonglo | | |
| | Goodradigbee River | | | | | | 345 m (1,132 ft) | Murrumbidgee | 35°00′S 148°38′E | 105 km (65 mi) |
| | | Rolling Grounds Creek | | | | | 1,039 m (3,409 ft) | Goodradigbee | | 7 km (4 mi) |
| | | Blackfellows Creek | | | | | 922 m (3,025 ft) | Goodradigbee | | 6 km (4 mi) |
| | | Coleman Creek | | | | | 674 m (2,211 ft) | Goodradigbee | | 17 km (11 mi) |
| | | | Browns Creek | | | | 1,020 m (3,346 ft) | Coleman | | 7 km (4 mi) |
| | | | Log Hut Creek | | | | 971 m (3,186 ft) | Coleman | | 4 km (2 mi) |
| | | Bull Flat Creek | | | | | 647 m (2,123 ft) | Goodradigbee | | 10 km (6 mi) |
| | | Bramina Creek | | | | | 635 m (2,083 ft) | Goodradigbee | | 20 km (12 mi) |
| | | | Diggers Creek | | | | 910 m (2,986 ft) | Bramina | | 5 km (3 mi) |
| | | | Mc Donald Creek | | | | 879 m (2,884 ft) | Bramina | | 7 km (4 mi) |
| | | Brindabella Creek | | | | | 623 m (2,044 ft) | Goodradigbee | | 8 km (5 mi) |
| | | Horse Creek | | | | | 560 m (1,837 ft) | Goodradigbee | | 5 km (3 mi) |
| | | Flea Creek | | | | | 501 m (1,644 ft) | Goodradigbee | | 11 km (7 mi) |
| | | Dinnertime Creek | | | | | 478 m (1,568 ft) | Goodradigbee | | 12 km (7 mi) |
| | | Limestone Creek | | | | | 443 m (1,453 ft) | Goodradigbee | | 12 km (7 mi) |
| | | Lousy Gully | | | | | 421 m (1,381 ft) | Goodradigbee | | 10 km (6 mi) |
| | | | Nottingham Creek | | | | 827 m (2,713 ft) | Lousy | | 7 km (4 mi) |
| | | Micalong Creek | | | | | 404 m (1,325 ft) | Goodradigbee | | 29 km (18 mi) |
| | | | Oaks Creek | | | | 815 m (2,674 ft) | Micalong | | 9 km (6 mi) |
| | | Betty Brook Creek | | | | | 380 m (1,247 ft) | Goodradigbee | | 11 km (7 mi) |
| | | Wee Jasper Creek | | | | | 372 m (1,220 ft) | Goodradigbee | | 14 km (9 mi) |
| | | Sugarloaf Creek | | | | | 346 m (1,135 ft) | Goodradigbee | | 16 km (10 mi) |
| | Yass River | | | | | | | Murrumbidgee | | |
| | Tumut River | | | | | | | Murrumbidgee | | |
| | | Goobarragandra River | | | | | | Tumut | | |
| | | Doubtful Creek | | | | | | Tumut | | |
| | Tarcutta Creek | | | | | | 185 m (607 ft) | Murrumbidgee | 35°37′4″S 148°38′36″E | 111 km (69 mi) |
| | Lachlan River | | | | | | 68 m (223 ft) | Murrumbidgee | 34°22′S 143°47′E | ~1,440 km (895 mi) |
| | | Humes Creek | | | | | 558 m (1,831 ft) | Lachlan | | 33 km (21 mi) |
| | | Blakney Creek | | | | | 495 m (1,624 ft) | Lachlan | | 31 km (19 mi) |
| | | Crookwell River | | | | | 430 m (1,411 ft) | Lachlan | 34°16′39″S 149°7′53″E | 78 km (48 mi) |
| | | | Wheeo Creek | | | | 592 m (1,942 ft) | Crookwell | 34°20′29″S 149°14′5″E | 43 km (27 mi) |
| | | Mulgowie Creek | | | | | 414 m (1,358 ft) | Lachlan | | 31 km (19 mi) |
| | | Bramah Creek | | | | | 406 m (1,332 ft) | Lachlan | | 19 km (12 mi) |
| | | Abercrombie River | | | | | 378 m (1,240 ft) | Lachlan | | 186 km (116 mi) |
| | | | Burra Burra Creek | | | | 593 m (1,946 ft) | Abercrombie | | 50 km (31 mi) |
| | | | Bolong River | | | | 569 m (1,867 ft) | Abercrombie | | 60 km (37 mi) |
| | | | Isabella River | | | | 479 m (1,572 ft) | Abercrombie | | 51 km (32 mi) |
| | | | Tuena Creek | | | | 432 m (1,417 ft) | Abercrombie | | 45 km (28 mi) |
| | | | | Peelwood Creek | | | 497 m (1,631 ft) | Tuena | | 33 km (21 mi) |
| | | | Copperhannia Creek | | | | 415 m (1,362 ft) | Abercrombie | | 25 km (16 mi) |
| | | | | Mulgunnia Creek | | | 549 m (1,801 ft) | Copperhannia | | 32 km (20 mi) |
| | | | Meglo Creek | | | | 413 m (1,355 ft) | Abercrombie | | 20 km (12 mi) |
| | | | Piesleys Creek | | | | 377 m (1,237 ft) | Abercrombie | | 16 km (10 mi) |
| | | | | Rocky Bridge Creek | | | 388 m (1,273 ft) | Piesleys | | 44 km (27 mi) |
| | | Milburn Creek | | | | | 310 m (1,017 ft) | Lachlan | | 28 km (17 mi) |
| | | Boorowa River | | | | | 303 m (994 ft) | Lachlan | | 134 km (83 mi) |
| | | | Pudman Creek | | | | 464 m (1,522 ft) | Boorowa | | 39 km (24 mi) |
| | | | Breakfast Creek | | | | 313 m (1,027 ft) | Boorowa | | 20 km (12 mi) |
| | | Hovells Creek | | | | | 302 m (991 ft) | Lachlan | | 61 km (38 mi) |
| | | | Phils Creek | | | | 488 m (1,601 ft) | Hovells | | 21 km (13 mi) |
| | | Neila Creek | | | | | 298 m (978 ft) | Lachlan | | 14 km (9 mi) |
| | | Waugoola Creek | | | | | 288 m (945 ft) | Lachlan | | 35 km (22 mi) |
| | | | Binni Creek | | | | 300 m (984 ft) | Waugoola | | 18 km (11 mi) |
| | | Morongla Creek | | | | | 287 m (942 ft) | Lachlan | | 21 km (13 mi) |
| | | Crowther Creek | | | | | 283 m (928 ft) | Lachlan | | 77 km (48 mi) |
| | | | Murringo Creek | | | | 355 m (1,165 ft) | Crowther | | 39 km (24 mi) |
| | | | | Top Creek | | | 384 m (1,260 ft) | Murringo | | 18 km (11 mi) |
| | | Pipe Clay Creek | | | | | 270 m (886 ft) | Lachlan | | 15 km (9 mi) |
| | | Kangarooby Creek | | | | | 269 m (883 ft) | Lachlan | | 33 km (21 mi) |
| | | Belubula River | | | | | 263 m (863 ft) | Lachlan | | 165 km (103 mi) |
| | | | Coombing Creek | | | | 673 m (2,208 ft) | Belubula | | 34 km (21 mi) |
| | | | Mandurama Ponds | | | | 552 m (1,811 ft) | Belubula | | 30 km (19 mi) |
| | | | | Grubbenbun Creek | | | 643 m (2,110 ft) | Mandurama | | 16 km (10 mi) |
| | | | Cadiangullong Creek | | | | 450 m (1,476 ft) | Belubula | | 17 km (11 mi) |
| | | | Swallow Creek | | | | 431 m (1,414 ft) | Belubula | | 16 km (10 mi) |
| | | | Limestone Creek | | | | 413 m (1,355 ft) | Belubula | | 26 km (16 mi) |
| | | | Panuara Rivulet | | | | 377 m (1,237 ft) | Belubula | | 22 km (14 mi) |
| | | | Jacks Creek | | | | 318 m (1,043 ft) | Belubula | | 16 km (10 mi) |
| | | | Nyrang Creek | | | | 264 m (866 ft) | Belubula | | 18 km (11 mi) |
| | | Mandagery Creek | | | | | 259 m (850 ft) | Lachlan | | 122 km (76 mi) |
| | | | Gumble Creek | | | | 455 m (1,493 ft) | Mandagery | | 18 km (11 mi) |
| | | | Manildra Creek | | | | 435 m (1,427 ft) | Mandagery | | 35 km (22 mi) |
| | | | Boree Creek | | | | 339 m (1,112 ft) | Mandagery | | 68 km (42 mi) |
| | | Ulguthrie Creek | | | | | 218 m (715 ft) | Lachlan | | 27 km (17 mi) |
| | | Bumbuggan Creek | | | | | 207 m (679 ft) | Lachlan | | 10 km (6 mi) |
| | | Island Creek | | | | | 204 m (669 ft) | Lachlan | | 42 km (26 mi) |
| | | Goobang Creek | | | | | 196 m (643 ft) | Lachlan | | 217 km (135 mi) |
| | | | Billabong Creek | | | | 313 m (1,027 ft) | Goobang | | 39 km (24 mi) |
| | | | Crooked Creek | | | | 229 m (751 ft) | Goobang | | 24 km (15 mi) |
| | | | Ramsays Lagoon | | | | 216 m (709 ft) | Goobang | | 7 km (4 mi) |
| | | Kiagathur Creek | | | | | 184 m (604 ft) | Lachlan | | 26 km (16 mi) |
| | | Wallaroi Creek | | | | | 182 m (597 ft) | Lachlan | | 104 km (65 mi) |
| | | | Wallamundry Creek | | | | 191 m (627 ft) | Wallaroi | | 55 km (34 mi) |
| | | | Humbug Creek | | | | 187 m (614 ft) | Wallaroi | | 150 km (93 mi) |
| | | | | Sharpless Creek | | | 203 m (666 ft) | Humbug | | 22 km (14 mi) |
| | | Borapine Creek | | | | | 169 m (554 ft) | Lachlan | | 35 km (22 mi) |
| | | Booberoi Creek | | | | | 155 m (509 ft) | Lachlan | | 98 km (61 mi) |
| | | | Crowie Creek | | | | 161 m (528 ft) | Booberoi | | 112 km (70 mi) |
| | | | | Teran Creek | | | 261 m (856 ft) | Crowie | | 22 km (14 mi) |
| | | Box Creek | | | | | 148 m (486 ft) | Lachlan | | 17 km (11 mi) |
| | | Mountain Creek | | | | | 144 m (472 ft) | Lachlan | | 24 km (15 mi) |
| | | Willandra Creek | | | | | 143 m (469 ft) | Lachlan | | 621 km (386 mi) |
| | | | Yangellawah Creek | | | | 105 m (344 ft) | Willandra | | 100 km (62 mi) |
| | | | Conoble Creek | | | | 105 m (344 ft) | Willandra | | 3 km (2 mi) |
| | | | Waverley Creek | | | | 88 m (289 ft) | Willandra | | 166 km (103 mi) |
| | | Middle Creek | | | | | 140 m (459 ft) | Lachlan | | 178 km (111 mi) |
| | | | Once-A-While Creek | | | | 100 m (328 ft) | Middle | | 47 km (29 mi) |
| | | Merrowie Creek | | | | | 129 m (423 ft) | Lachlan | | 392 km (244 mi) |
| | | | Umbrella Creek | | | | 109 m (358 ft) | Merrowie | | 36 km (22 mi) |
| | | | Box Creek | | | | 106 m (348 ft) | Merrowie | | 43 km (27 mi) |
| | | Cabbage Garden Creek | | | | | 117 m (384 ft) | Lachlan | | 107 km (66 mi) |
| | | Gums Creek | | | | | 105 m (344 ft) | Lachlan | | 13 km (8 mi) |
| | | Torriganny Creek | | | | | 102 m (335 ft) | Lachlan | | 46 km (29 mi) |
| | | Yandumblin Creek | | | | | 100 m (328 ft) | Lachlan | | 19 km (12 mi) |
| | | | Big Ben Creek | | | | 98 m (322 ft) | Yandumblin | | 16 km (10 mi) |
| | | Mirrool Creek | | | | | 91 m (299 ft) | Lachlan | | 73 km (45 mi) |
| | | | Wah Wah No 9 Channel | | | | | Mirrool | | 1 km (1 mi) |
| | | Pimpara Creek | | | | | 83 m (272 ft) | Lachlan | | 78 km (48 mi) |
| | | Merrimajeel Creek | | | | | 82 m (269 ft) | Lachlan | | 26 km (16 mi) |
