= Black Spring =

Black Spring or Black Springs may refer to:

== Arts and entertainment ==
- Black Spring (EP), a 1991 EP by Lush
- "Black Springs", a song by Total Control from the 2014 album Typical System
- Black Spring (short stories), a 1939 book by Henry Miller
- Black Spring Press, a British publisher

== Places ==
- Black Springs, Arkansas, a town in the U.S.
- Black Springs, New South Wales, a village in Australia
- Black Springs, South Australia, a locality and former township in Australia
- Black Spring ('Mustallikas'), part of the Saula Blue Springs in Estonia
- Black Springs Creek, a watercourse in the Australian Capital Territory

== Other uses ==
- Black Spring (Algeria), a 2001 series of demonstrations in Kabylie, Algeria
- Black Spring (Cuba), a 2003 crackdown on Havava dissidents
