= Oakey Creek =

Oaky Creek or Oakey Creek may refer to:

== Waterways ==
In Australia

- Cadiangullong Creek (formerly Oaky Creek), in New South Wales
- Jeir Creek (formerly Oakey Creek), in New South Wales
- Oakey Creek (Australian Capital Territory), in the Australian Capital Territory
- Oakey Cree, a tributary of the Coomera River in Queensland

== Other uses ==
- Oaky Creek coal mine, a mine in Central Queensland, Australia
- Oaky Creek, Queensland, a locality in the Scenic Rim Region, Queensland, Australia
- Oakey, Queensland, a town initially known as Oakey Creek in the Toowoomba Region, Queensland, Australia
- Oakey Creek, Queensland, a locality in the Rockhampton Region, Queensland, Australia
