= Saula, Estonia =

Village in Estonia

Coordinates: 59°12′N 25°02′E

Saula
- Village
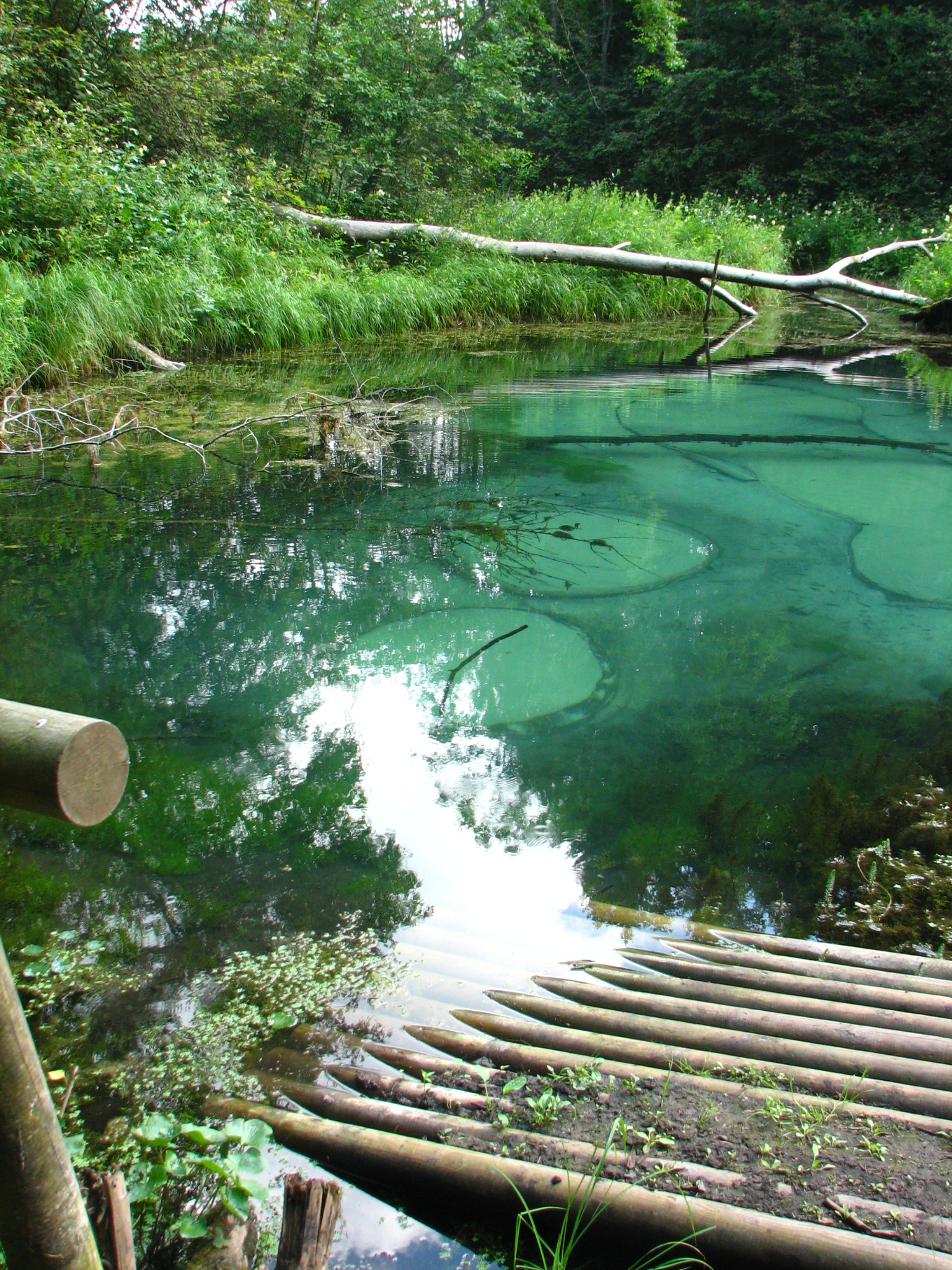
- Saula Blue Springs
- Interactive map of Saula
- Country: Estonia
- County: Harju County
- Parish: Kose Parish
- Time zone: UTC+2 (EET)
  - Summer (DST): UTC+3 (EEST)

Saula is a village in Kose Parish, Harju County in northern Estonia.

Saula is the location of Viking Village (Estonian: Viikingite Küla), a viking-themed theme park.

== See also ==
- Saula Blue Springs
