= List of watercourses in the Australian Capital Territory =

This is a list of watercourses in the Australian Capital Territory. It includes all rivers, streams, brooks, creeks, gullies, anabranches, backwaters, and any other watercourses with a gazetted name.

This list is complete with respect to the 1996 Gazetteer of Australia. Dubious names have been checked against the online 2004 data, and in all cases confirmed correct. However, if any watercourses have been gazetted or deleted since 1996, this list does not reflect these changes. Strictly speaking, Australian place names are gazetted in capital accordance with normal capitalisation conventions. Locations are as gazetted; obviously some watercourses may extend over long distances.

Name	Latitude	Longitude	Remarks
Allens Creek	35° 24' S	149° 2' E	
Ashbrook Creek	35° 28' S	148° 54' E	
Back Creek	35° 52' S	148° 57' E	Also known as Grassy Creek
Barnes Creek	35° 28' S	149° 3' E	
Bendora Creek	35° 25' S	148° 50' E	
Billy Billy Creek	35° 30' S	148° 55' E	
Bimberi Creek	35° 40' S	148° 50' E	
Black Creek	35° 19' S	149° 8' E	
Black Springs Creek	35° 19' S	148° 52' E	
Blue Gum Creek	35° 30' S	148° 59' E	
Blundells Creek	35° 22' S	148° 50' E	
Bogong Creek	35° 46' S	148° 57' E	
Booroomba Creek	35° 35' S	148° 55' E	
Booths Creek	35° 42' S	149° 3' E	
Breakfast Creek	35° 48' S	148° 58' E	
Bulgar Creek	35° 21' S	149° 0' E	
Bullock Head Creek	35° 23' S	148° 52' E	
Bulls Flat Creek	35° 50' S	148° 58' E	
Burkes Creek	35° 24' S	148° 51' E	
Bushrangers Creek	35° 25' S	148° 50' E	
Clear Hills Creek	35° 34' S	148° 50' E	
Cliffs Creek	35° 16' S	148° 59' E	
Collins Creek	35° 26' S	148° 49' E	
Condor Creek	35° 19' S	148° 50' E	
Coppins Creek	35° 17' S	149° 2' E	
Coree Creek	35° 20' S	148° 54' E	
Cotter River	35° 30' S	148° 50' E	
Cow Flat Creek	35° 27' S	148° 50' E	
Creamy Flats Creek	35° 40' S	148° 51' E	
Cribbs Creek	35° 36' S	148° 49' E	
Dairy Station Creek	35° 20' S	149° 22' E	
De Salis Creek	35° 37' S	148° 49' E	
Deep Creek	35° 17' S	149° 2' E	
Doughboy Creek	35° 17' S	149° 11' E	
Drag Creek	35° 43' S	148° 50' E	
Dry Creek	35° 35' S	148° 50' E	
Dunns Creek	35° 27' S	149° 8' E	
Fastigata Creek	35° 19' S	148° 49' E	
Franklin Creek	35° 27' S	148° 49' E	
Freshford Creek	35° 25' S	149° 2' E	
Georges Creek	35° 32' S	149° 1' E	
Gibraltar Creek	35° 27' S	148° 59' E	
Gingera Creek	35° 35' S	148° 49' E	
Ginini Creek	35° 30' S	148° 47' E	
Ginninderra Creek	35° 12' S	149° 0' E	
Glen Burn Creek	35° 19' S	149° 18' E	
Gooromon Ponds Creek	35° 20' S	149° 0' E	
Grassy Creek	35° 52' S	149° 1' E	
Gudgenby Creek	35° 40' S	149° 4' E	
Gudgenby River	35° 40' S	149° 0' E	
Guises Creek	35° 30' S	149° 9' E	
Half Moon Creek	35° 37' S	149° 2' E	
Halls Creek	35° 11' S	149° 2' E	
Holdens Creek	35° 19' S	149° 2' E	
Honeysuckle Creek	35° 35' S	148° 59' E	
Hospital Creek	35° 45' S	148° 59' E	
Hurdle Creek	35° 26' S	148° 56' E	
Jacks Creek	35° 41' S	148° 49' E	
James Creek	35° 37' S	148° 57' E	
Jerrabomberra Creek	35° 19' S	149° 10' E	
Kangaroo Creek	35° 32' S	148° 51' E	
Larrys Creek	35° 24' S	148° 58' E	
Lees Creek	35° 20' S	148° 53' E	
Left Hand Creek	35° 49' S	149° 4' E	
Lickhole Creek	35° 28' S	148° 54' E	
Licking Hole Creek	35° 39' S	148° 50' E	
Little Bimberi Creek	35° 40' S	148° 50' E	
Little Collins Creek	35° 26' S	148° 48' E	
Little Dry Creek	35° 46' S	149° 0' E	
Lobbs Hole Creek	35° 34' S	149° 7' E	
Long Creek	35° 36' S	148° 49' E	
McKeahnie Creek	35° 38' S	148° 49' E	
McQuoid Creek	35° 24' S	149° 1' E	
Middle Creek	35° 45' S	148° 58' E	
Molonglo River	35° 15' S	148° 58' E	
Monks Creek	35° 26' S	149° 7' E	
Mosquito Creek	35° 37' S	148° 49' E	
Mountain Creek	35° 28' S	148° 54' E	
Murrumbidgee River	35° 18' S	148° 58' E	
Musk Creek	35° 19' S	148° 50' E	
Naas Creek	35° 52' S	149° 0' E	
New Station Creek	35° 23' S	149° 1' E	
North Arm	35° 25' S	148° 51' E	
Nursery Creek	35° 42' S	149° 0' E	
Oakey Creek	35° 23' S	148° 56' E	
Orroral River	35° 40' S	149° 0' E	
Paddys River	35° 20' S	148° 56' E	
Pheasant Creek	35° 43' S	148° 59' E	
Pierces Creek	35° 20' S	148° 54' E	
Piney Creek	35° 16' S	149° 0' E	
Pond Creek	35° 38' S	148° 50' E	
Porcupine Creek	35° 42' S	148° 50' E	
Prairie Dog Creek	35° 37' S	148° 54' E	sic
Punch Bowl Creek	35° 30' S	148° 59' E	
Punchbowl Creek	35° 31' S	148° 57' E	
Queanbeyan River	35° 20' S	149° 14' E	
Reedy Creek	35° 46' S	149° 5' E	
Reids Creek	35° 26' S	148° 56' E	
Rendezvous Creek	35° 44' S	149° 0' E	
Rocky Gully Creek	35° 27' S	149° 8' E	
Sawpit Creek	35° 28' S	148° 54' E	
Sawyers Gully	35° 31' S	149° 3' E	
Shanahans Falls Creek	35° 49' S	149° 4' E	
Sheedys Creek	35° 27' S	148° 56' E	
Sheep Station Creek	35° 50' S	148° 57' E	
Snowy Flat Creek	35° 33' S	148° 49' E	
South Arm	35° 25' S	148° 51' E	
Spring Station Creek	35° 31' S	149° 3' E	
Stockyard Creek	35° 30' S	148° 49' E	
Stoney Creek	35° 18' S	148° 58' E	
Sullivans Creek	35° 17' S	149° 7' E	
Swamp Creek	35° 15' S	148° 56' E	
Tanners Flat Creek	35° 24' S	148° 57' E	
Tarpaulin Creek	35° 16' S	148° 57' E	
Telegraph Creek	35° 9' S	150° 43' E	
Telephone Gully Creek	35° 31' S	149° 8' E	
Tidbinbilla River	35° 26' S	148° 57' E	
Tuggeranong Creek	35° 20' S	149° 3' E	
Uriarra Creek	35° 16' S	148° 55' E	
Uriarra Creek (South Arm)	35° 17' S	148° 54' E	
Village Creek	35° 25' S	149° 3' E	
Weber Creek	35° 20' S	149° 19' E	
Weston Creek	35° 20' S	149° 3' E	
White Sands Creek	35° 32' S	148° 51' E	
Wombat Creek	35° 19' S	148° 51' E	
Woolshed Creek	35° 18' S	149° 11' E	
Yarralumla Creek	35° 19' S	149° 4' E	
