= Naas River =

Naas
- Location of the Naas River mouth in the ACT
- Etymology: Possibly named after Naas, Ireland

Location
- Country: Australia
- Territory: Australian Capital Territory
- Region: South Eastern Highlands (IBRA), Capital Country

Physical characteristics
- Source: Snowy Mountains
  - location: Namadgi National Park
  - coordinates: 35°50′21″S 149°5′1″E
  - elevation: 898 m (2,946 ft)
- Mouth: confluence with the Gudgenby River
  - location: south of Tharwa
  - coordinates: 35°36′1″S 149°4′4″E
  - elevation: 631 m (2,070 ft)
- Length: 26 km (16 mi)

Basin features
- River system: Murrumbidgee River, Murray–Darling basin
- Tributaries
  - left: Nass Creek, Left Hand Creek (ACT), Gudgenby Creek, Reedy Creek (ACT)
- National park: Namadgi

The Naas River, a perennial stream of the Murrumbidgee catchment within the Murray–Darling basin, is located in the Australian Capital Territory, Australia.

== Course ==
The river rises in the southern ranges of Namadgi National Park, south of Canberra, with flow generated by runoff and melting snow during spring from the Snowy Mountains. The river flows generally north, joined by four minor tributaries, before reaching its confluence with the Gudgenby River, south of Tharwa, descending 266 metres (873 ft) over its 26-kilometre (16 mi) course.

The watershed boundary of the Naas River defines the southern and south-eastern border of the Australian Capital Territory with New South Wales.

== See also ==
- List of rivers of Australia § Australian Capital Territory
- Australian Alps Walking Track
