= Saula Blue Springs =

Group of springs in Estonia

Coordinates: 59°12′54″N 25°02′34″E

Drone video of a blue spring of Saula

The Saula Blue Springs (Estonian: Saula Siniallikad) are freshwater springs located in Saula Village, Kose Parish, Harju County in northern Estonia. There are three major springs that produce a flow of 20 to 30 litres (5.3 to 7.9 US gal) per second. The springs are differentiated by their color: Blue Spring (Siniallikas) is blue-green; Black Spring (Mustallikas) is brownish black; and White Spring (Valgeallikas) is blue-gray. The water from the springs flows into the Pirita River.

The springs are protected as a natural monument, as well as a cultural heritage site.

== Gallery ==
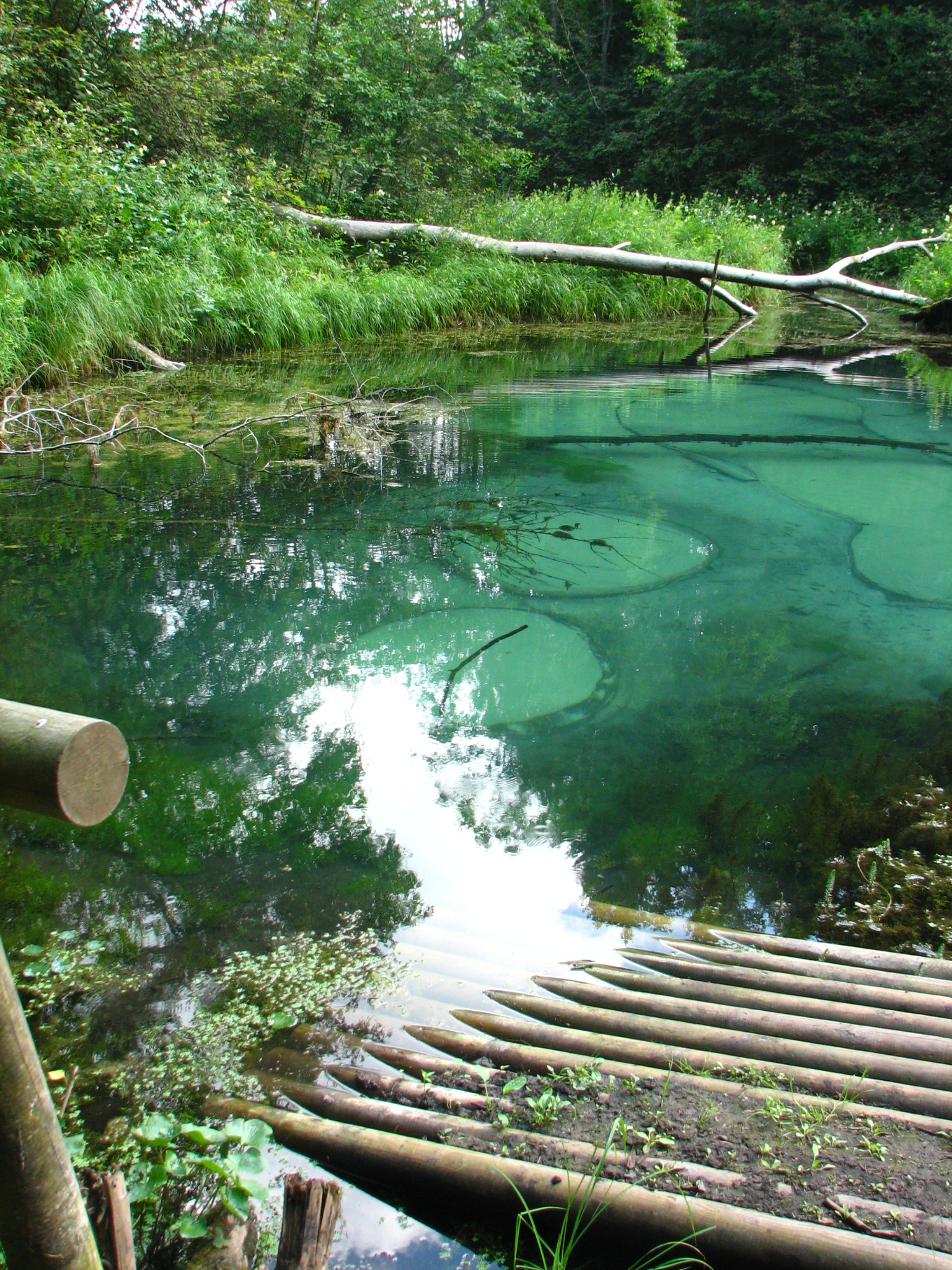
Blue Spring

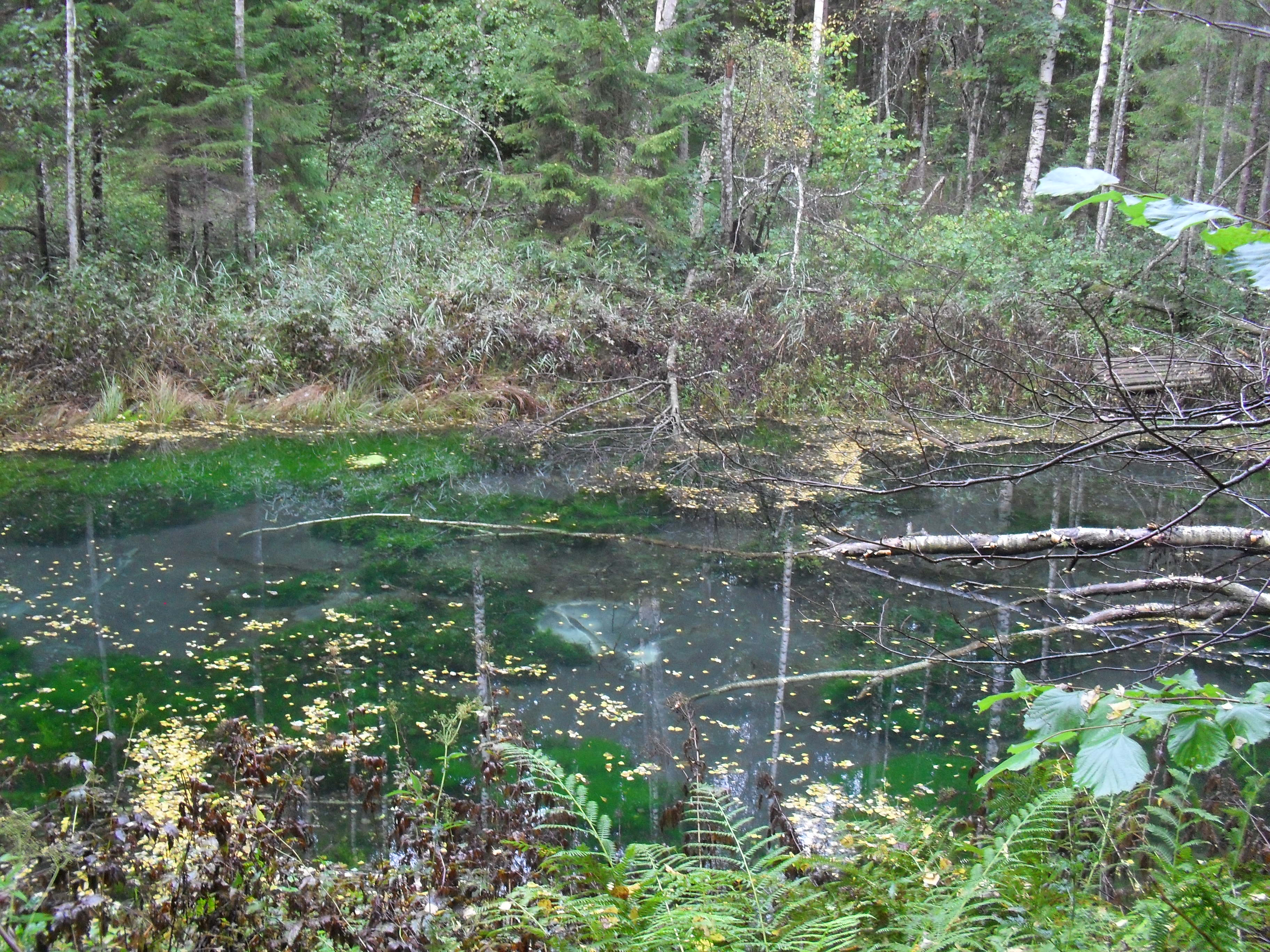
Black Spring

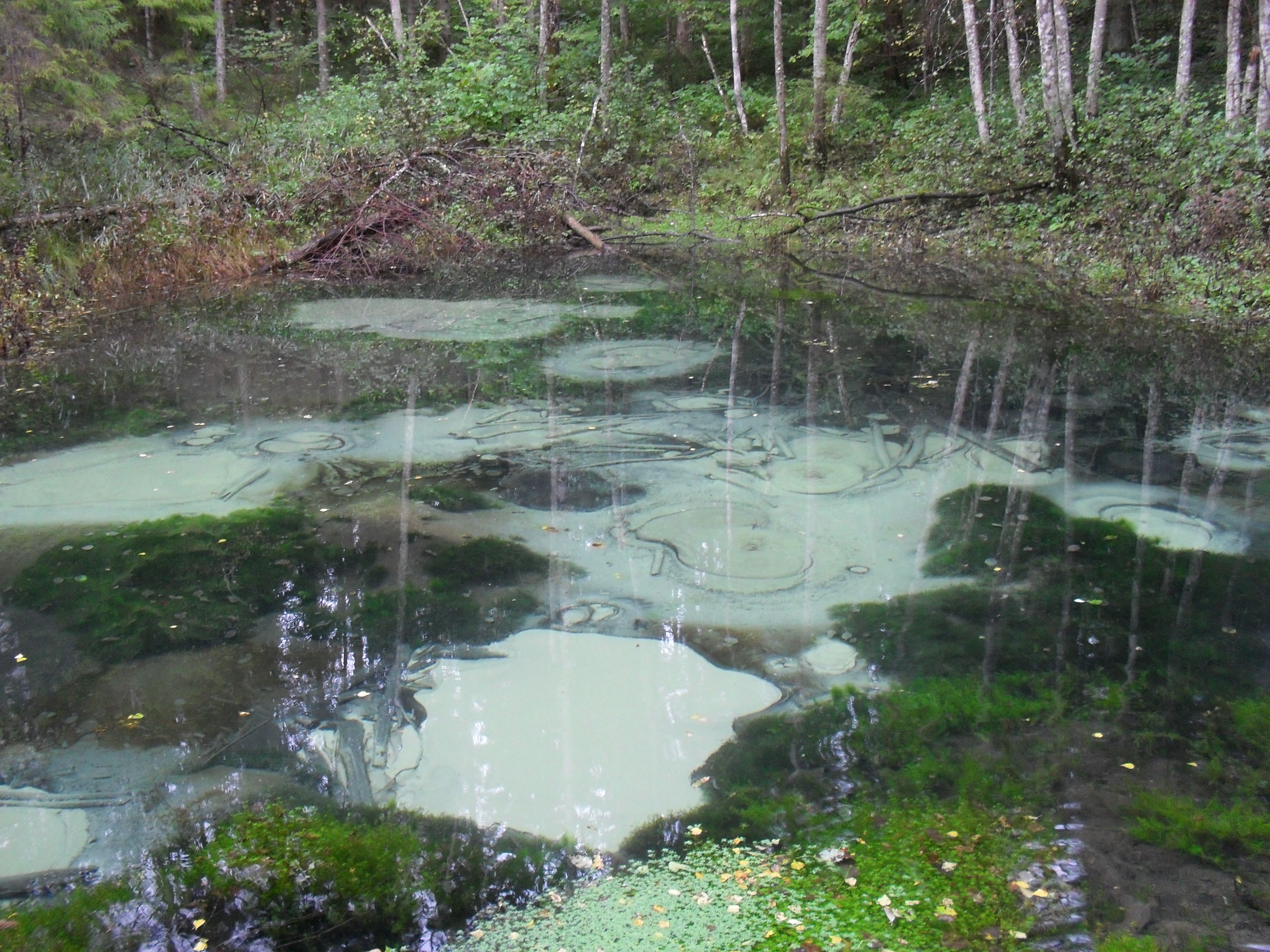
White Spring
