= Orroral River =

Orroral
- Location of the Orroral River mouth in the ACT

Location
- Country: Australia
- Territory: Australian Capital Territory
- Region: South Eastern Highlands (IBRA), Capital Country

Physical characteristics
- Source: Brindabella Range
  - location: Namadgi National Park
  - coordinates: 35°34′49″S 148°54′39″E
  - elevation: 1,000 m (3,300 ft)
- Mouth: confluence with the Gudgenby River
  - location: south of Tharwa
  - coordinates: 35°40′14″S 148°59′46″E
  - elevation: 842 m (2,762 ft)
- Length: 15 km (9.3 mi)

Basin features
- River system: Murrumbidgee River, Murray–Darling basin
- National park: Namadgi

Orroral River, a perennial stream of the Murrumbidgee catchment within the Murray–Darling basin, is located in the Australian Capital Territory, Australia.

== Course ==
The river rises in the southern ranges of Namadgi National Park, south of Canberra, with flow generated by runoff and melting snow during spring from the Snowy Mountains. The river flows generally south-east, joined by one minor tributaries, before reaching its confluence with the Gudgenby River, south of Tharwa, descending 159 metres (522 ft) over its 26-kilometre (16 mi) course.

== See also ==
- List of rivers of Australia § Australian Capital Territory
