= Gudgenby River =

Gudgenby
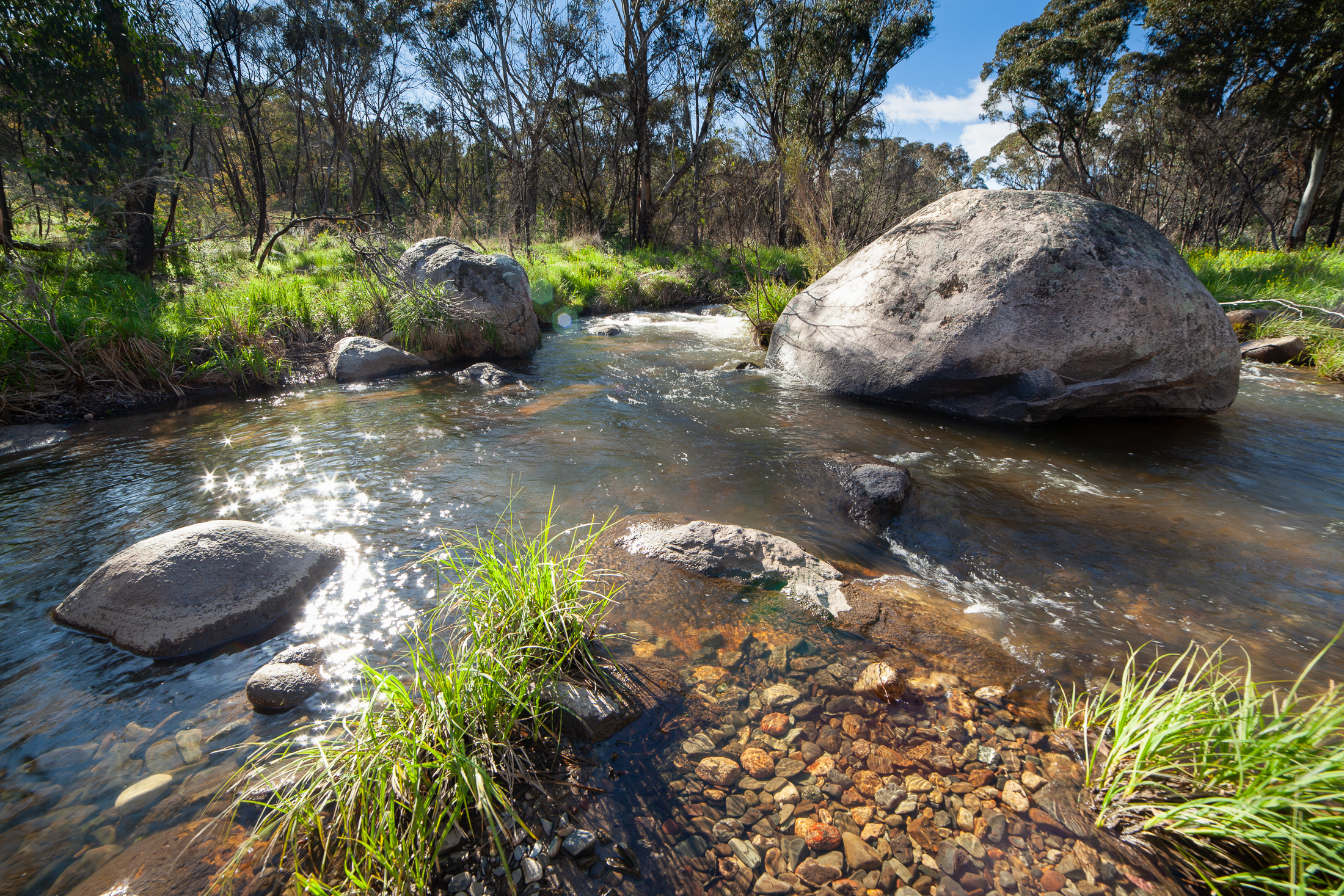
- A bend in the Gudgenby River near the Glendale Picnic area in the Namadgi National Park

- Location of the Gudgenby River mouth in the ACT

Location
- Country: Australia
- Territory: Australian Capital Territory
- Region: South Eastern Highlands (IBRA), Capital Country

Physical characteristics
- Source: Mount Gudgenby and Yankee Hat, Brindabella Range
- Source confluence: Bogong Creek and Middle Creek (Australian Capital Territory)
  - location: Namadgi National Park
  - coordinates: 35°46′17″S 148°56′31″E
  - elevation: 995 m (3,264 ft)
- Mouth: confluence with the Murrumbidgee River
  - location: near Tharwa
  - coordinates: 35°31′14″S 149°4′33″E
  - elevation: 573 m (1,880 ft)
- Length: 35 km (22 mi)

Basin features
- River system: Murrumbidgee River, Murray–Darling basin
- Tributaries
  - left: Nursery Creek, Orroral River, Booroomba Creek, Naas River
  - right: Hospital Creek (ACT), Dry Creek (ACT), Half Moon Creek

The Gudgenby River, a perennial river that is part of the Murrumbidgee catchment within the Murray–Darling basin, is located in the Australian Capital Territory, Australia.

== Location and features ==
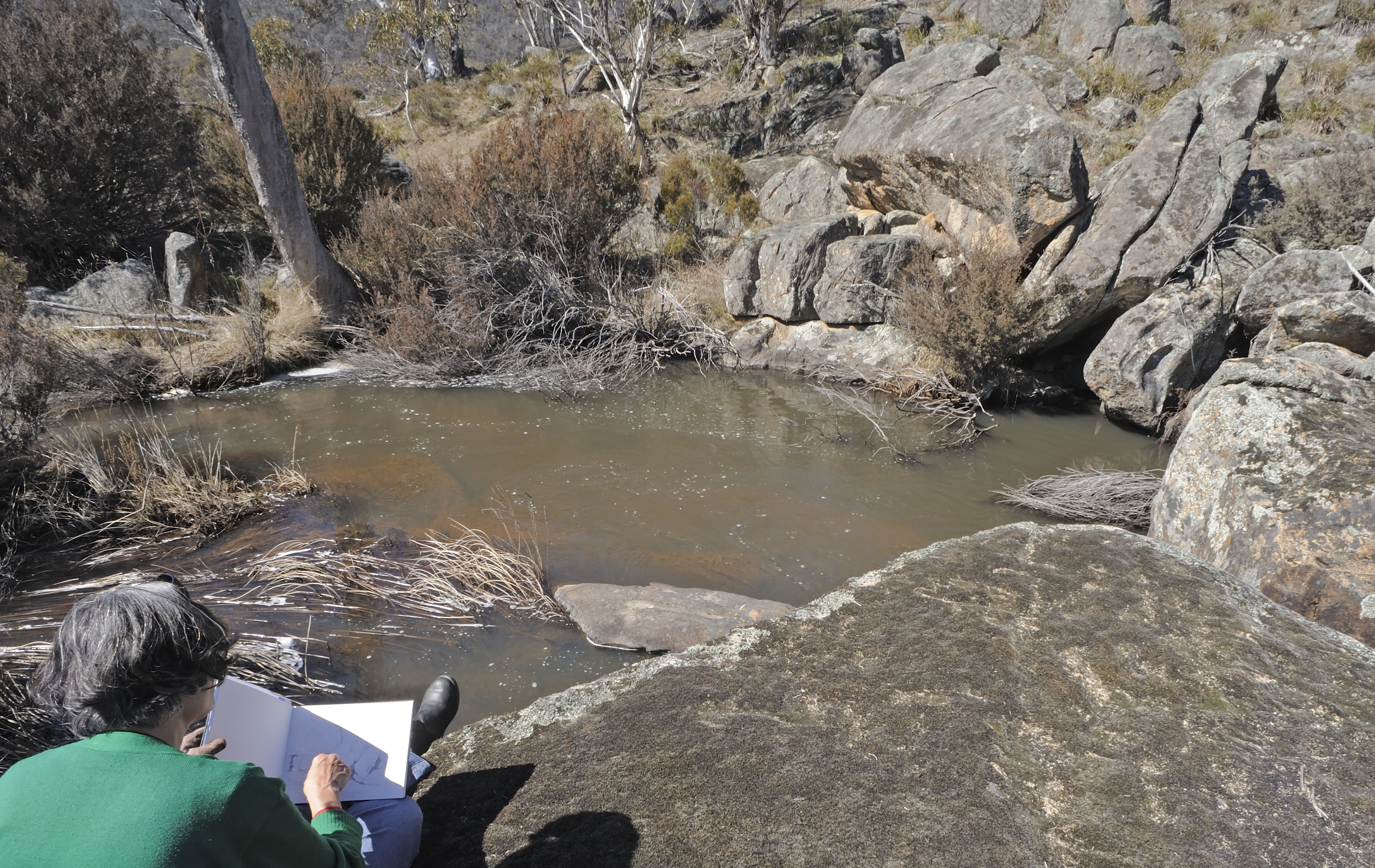
Ruth Hingston, artist, drawing the rock formations by the Gudgenby River

Formed by the confluence of Bogong Creek and Middle Creek, the Gudgenby River rises within Namadgi National Park, below Yankee Hat and Mount Gudgenby, on the south-eastern slopes of the Brindabella Range in the south of the Australian Capital Territory (ACT). The river flows generally north and north-east, joined by nine tributaries, including the Naas River and Orroral River, before reaching its confluence with the Murrumbidgee River, near Tharwa. The river descends 422 metres (1,385 ft) over its 35 kilometres (22 mi) course.

The river catchment contains ecologically significant alpine wetlands.

In 2004, ACTEW announced that the creation of a large 159-gigalitre (5.6×10^{9} cu ft) reservoir by damming the Gudgenby River, below Mount Tennent, was one of three options being considered as part of the Future Water Options Project to provide improved reliability and increased supply of potable water for Canberra and the ACT. By 2005, the ACT Government decided that the creation of the Mount Tennent dam would not proceed, in favour of enlarging the Cotter Dam.

== Climate ==
Due to its much higher elevation, the area has a significantly colder climate than Canberra. Gudgenby is where the record low of –14.6 °C for the Australian Capital Territory was held; this was also the lowest recorded temperature for anywhere in Australia outside of the alpine regions—narrowly outdoing Woolbrook. This is especially significant given the Gudgenby site had just twenty years of temperature record; from 1967 to 1988.

Climate data for Gudgenby (1967−1988, rainfall to 1886); 975 m AMSL; 35.75° S, 148.98° E
Month	Jan	Feb	Mar	Apr	May	Jun	Jul	Aug	Sep	Oct	Nov	Dec	Year
Record high °C (°F)	39.0 (102.2)	37.8 (100.0)	33.5 (92.3)	31.0 (87.8)	22.3 (72.1)	16.3 (61.3)	16.5 (61.7)	21.5 (70.7)	25.8 (78.4)	28.5 (83.3)	32.0 (89.6)	35.0 (95.0)	39.0 (102.2)
Mean maximum °C (°F)	33.9 (93.0)	33.2 (91.8)	28.8 (83.8)	23.9 (75.0)	19.1 (66.4)	14.5 (58.1)	13.6 (56.5)	16.3 (61.3)	21.0 (69.8)	24.5 (76.1)	27.9 (82.2)	31.3 (88.3)	34.8 (94.6)
Mean daily maximum °C (°F)	25.7 (78.3)	25.4 (77.7)	22.1 (71.8)	17.9 (64.2)	13.1 (55.6)	10.1 (50.2)	9.3 (48.7)	10.9 (51.6)	13.8 (56.8)	17.4 (63.3)	20.0 (68.0)	23.7 (74.7)	17.5 (63.4)
Daily mean °C (°F)	17.5 (63.5)	17.4 (63.3)	14.4 (57.9)	10.2 (50.4)	6.6 (43.9)	3.9 (39.0)	3.2 (37.8)	4.5 (40.1)	6.9 (44.4)	10.3 (50.5)	12.5 (54.5)	15.4 (59.7)	10.2 (50.4)
Mean daily minimum °C (°F)	9.3 (48.7)	9.4 (48.9)	6.6 (43.9)	2.5 (36.5)	0.1 (32.2)	−2.3 (27.9)	−3.0 (26.6)	−1.8 (28.8)	0.0 (32.0)	3.2 (37.8)	5.0 (41.0)	7.1 (44.8)	3.0 (37.4)
Mean minimum °C (°F)	2.0 (35.6)	1.7 (35.1)	−1.3 (29.7)	−5.6 (21.9)	−8.3 (17.1)	−9.2 (15.4)	−10.2 (13.6)	−8.6 (16.5)	−6.6 (20.1)	−3.8 (25.2)	−2.1 (28.2)	0.0 (32.0)	−10.9 (12.4)
Record low °C (°F)	−2.5 (27.5)	−2.2 (28.0)	−4.8 (23.4)	−8.2 (17.2)	−11.0 (12.2)	−12.0 (10.4)	−14.6 (5.7)	−10.8 (12.6)	−9.3 (15.3)	−7.0 (19.4)	−5.2 (22.6)	−1.5 (29.3)	−14.6 (5.7)
Average precipitation mm (inches)	75.2 (2.96)	57.9 (2.28)	65.4 (2.57)	55.7 (2.19)	55.6 (2.19)	69.3 (2.73)	58.2 (2.29)	57.9 (2.28)	69.7 (2.74)	74.8 (2.94)	63.7 (2.51)	63.9 (2.52)	767.3 (30.2)
Average precipitation days	6.9	6.2	7.0	6.5	7.1	8.5	8.4	9.2	9.2	9.4	8.1	7.6	94.1
Source: Australian Bureau of Meteorology; Gudgenby

== See also ==
- List of rivers of Australia § Australian Capital Territory
