= Yarralumla =

Yarralumla may refer to:

- Government House, Canberra, the residence of the Governor-General of Australia, sometimes referred to known as Yarralumla because of its location in that suburb
- Yarralumla, Australian Capital Territory, a suburb of Canberra
- Yarralumla Primary School
