= Yarralumla, Australian Capital Territory =

Suburb of Canberra, Australia

Yarralumla
- Suburb
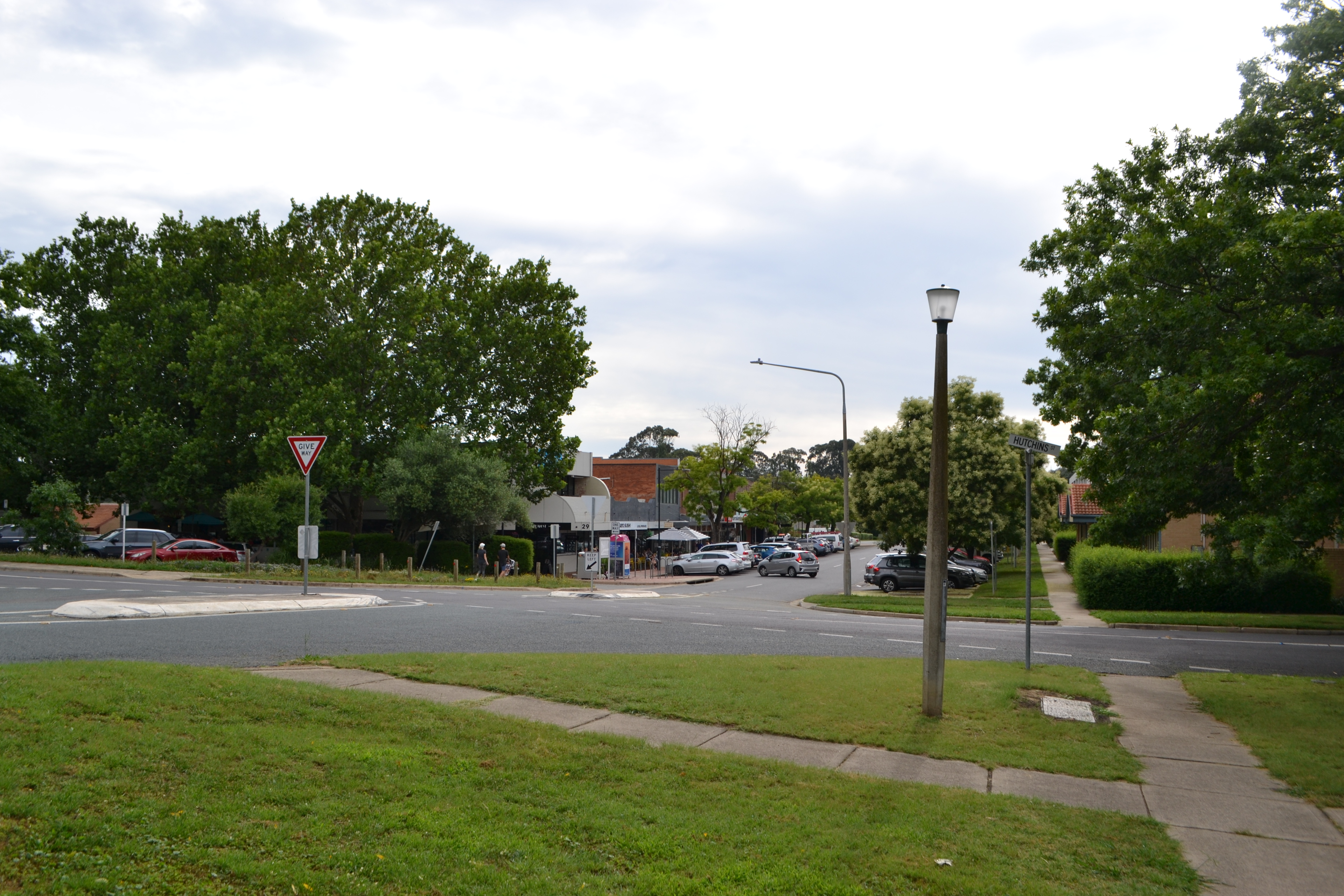
- Yarralumla local shops

- Location in Canberra
- Coordinates: 35°18′14″S 149°05′54″E
- Country: Australia
- State: Australian Capital Territory
- City: Canberra
- District: South Canberra
- Location: 3 km (1.9 mi) SW of Canberra CBD; 14 km (8.7 mi) W of Queanbeyan; 98 km (61 mi) SW of Goulburn; 295 km (183 mi) SW of Sydney
- Established: 1922

Government
  - Territory electorate: Murrumbidgee
  - Federal division: Canberra

Area
  - Total: 8.81 km^{2} (3.40 sq mi)
- Elevation: 570 m (1,870 ft)

Population
  - Total: 3,120 (2021 census)
  - Density: 354.1/km^{2} (917.2/sq mi)
- Postcode: 2600
- Gazetted: 20 September 1928
Suburbs around Yarralumla
Black Mountain	Acton	City
Stromlo Forest	Yarralumla	Parkes
Curtin	Deakin	Capital Hill

Yarralumla (/jærəlʌmlə/) is a large inner south suburb of Canberra, the capital city of Australia. Located approximately 3.5 km (2.2 mi) south-west of the city, Yarralumla extends along the south-west bank of Lake Burley Griffin from Scrivener Dam to Commonwealth Avenue.

In 1828, Henry Donnison, a Sydney merchant, was granted a lease on the western side of West Ridge, part of which is now Western Park. In 1832, he named his property Yarralumla, adopted from the name for an area some 35km to the west surrounding the Goodradigbee River. It is thought the area, spelt 'Yarrowlumla', was so named by local Aboriginal people, translated to English as "echo mountain". In 1881, the estate was bought by Frederick Campbell, grandson of Robert Campbell who had built a house at nearby Duntroon. Frederick completed the construction of a large, gabled, brick house on his property in 1891 that now serves as the site of Government House, the official residence of the Governor-General of Australia. Campbell's house replaced an elegant, Georgian-style homestead, the main portions of which were erected from local stone in the 1830s. Among the old Yarralumla homestead's most notable occupants were Sir Terence Aubrey Murray, who owned Yarralumla sheep station from 1837 to 1859, Augustus Onslow Manby Gibbes, who owned the property from 1859 to 1881, and Augustus' father Colonel John George Nathaniel Gibbes (1787–1873).

The modern suburb of Yarralumla was gazetted by the government in 1928 and as of 2021 was home to approximately 3,120 people and many diplomatic missions. Notable locations include Lennox Gardens, the Albert Hall and the Hotel Canberra. Parliament House and The Lodge lie just outside its boundary.

== Geography ==
Yarralumla is located in the central Canberra district of South Canberra in the Australian Capital Territory, a federal territory. It is bordered by Lake Burley Griffin to the north, Commonwealth Avenue and Capital Hill to the east, Adelaide Avenue and the Cotter Road to the south, and Scrivener Dam, Lady Denman Drive and part of the Molonglo River to the west. Its southeast corner abuts Capital Hill, the location of Parliament House. The Lodge lies across Adelaide Avenue near its eastern end.

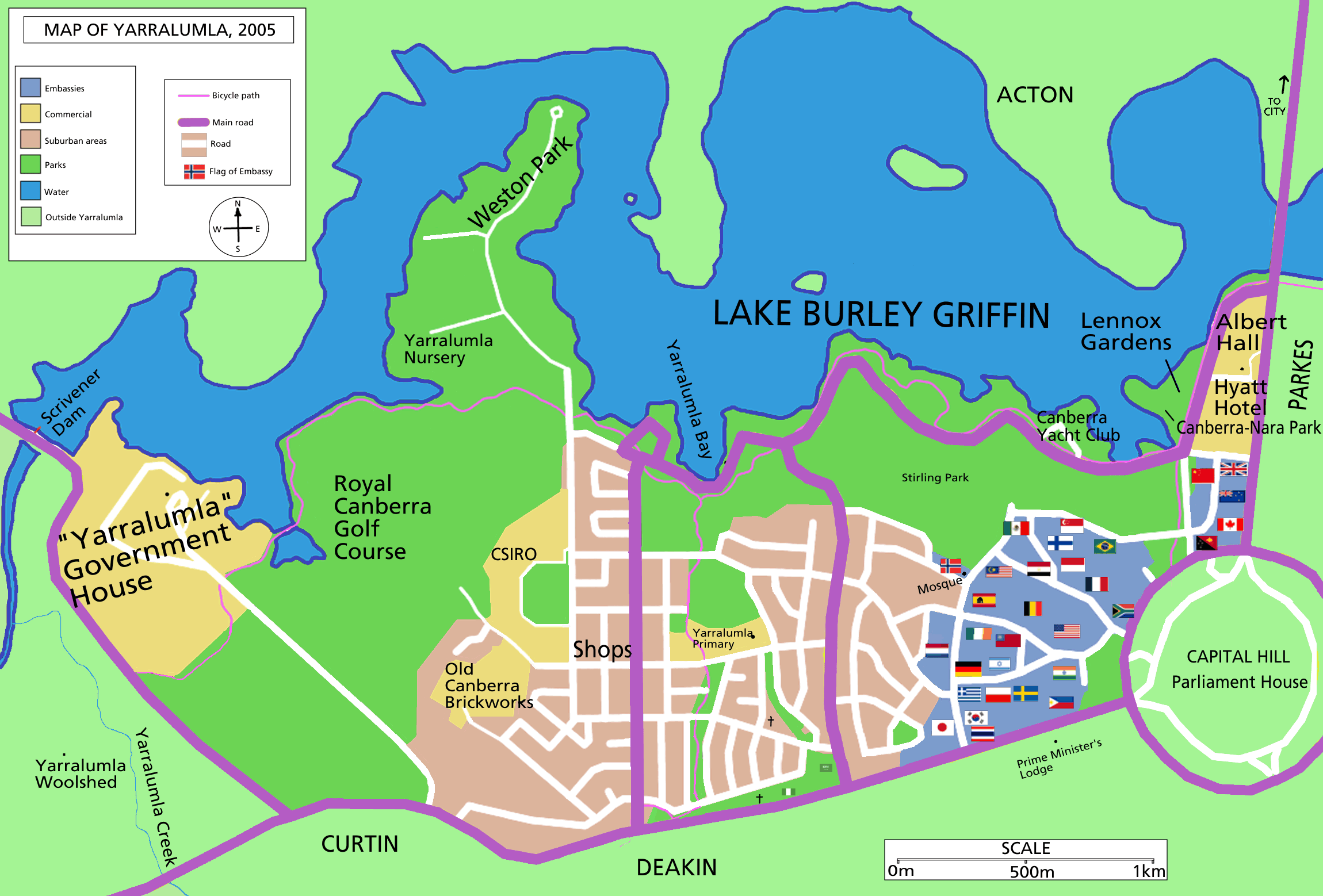
Map of Yarralumla, located south of Lake Burley Griffin

The streets in Yarralumla are named after Australian governors and botanists. Most of the older streets in the suburb are laid out on an approximately rectangular grid with some curved sections, while the more hilly eastern end of the suburb, including the embassy district, is set out with contour-guided roads. Major roads in Yarralumla include Banks Street, Novar Street and Hopetoun Circuit in a north–south direction and Schlich Street, Loftus Street and Weston Street running east–west. Being a dormitory suburb, there are no major through roads. Access to the rest of the city can be made from Adelaide Avenue, Commonwealth Avenue, Lady Denman Drive and Cotter Road, all of which run along the borders of the suburb. From these roads, entry to the suburb can be gained by turning into roads such as Coronation Drive, Hopetoun Circuit and Novar Street. Yarralumla has wide, tree-lined streets, most of which have been planted with exotic trees such as atlas cedars and cherry plums on Banks Street, claret ashes on Loch Street, pin oaks on Schlich Street and English oaks and hawthorns on Weston Street, along with the indigenous white brittle gums on Empire Circuit and river oaks on Solander Place.

Much of the area of Yarralumla consists of open space or non-residential development, including Weston and Stirling Parks, the Royal Canberra Golf Club, and the grounds of Government House. Many houses are occupied by diplomatic missions. The embassy area of Yarralumla is located towards the eastern end of the suburb next to Stirling Park. It is the hilliest area of Yarralumla. The Parliamentary Triangle is located to its east.

The residential areas of Yarralumla are located in the central and western areas of the suburb. The Yarralumla shops at the corner of Novar and Bentham Streets are in the centre of the western residential area, which has typically flat terrain and streets laid out in a rectangular grid, typically lined by exotic trees. This area has a blend of original weatherboard, monocrete and brick dwellings as well as some recently rebuilt detached houses, dual occupancies and units. Minimbah Court at the corner of Banks and Schlicht Streets is an example of Canberra’s earlier medium-density unit buildings. It was constructed in the 1950s and originally named Solander Court in line with nearby streets named after First Fleet botanists. There is an elongated reserve with a walking and bicycle path running in a southwards direction of the Yarralumla Oval, and to the east of this is the central area of the suburb, where the blocks are larger and the streets are more contoured due to the hilly terrain. There is a mixture of housing types in this region, with some larger two-storey houses, and more expansive gardens. The streets in this part of the suburb are typically lined with native trees.

Yarralumla is located on the Yarralumla Formation which is a mudstone/siltstone formation that was formed around 425 million years ago during the Silurian Period. The formation extends from Red Hill and Woden in the South to Lake Burley Griffin in to the north, passing under the suburb of Yarralumla. The formation is evidence of the last major marine sedimentary period when eastern Australia was still covered by shallow seas. It shows fossil evidence of trilobites, coral and primitive crinoids. The Yarralumla brickworks quarry and the Deakin anticline are places where the formation is exposed and easily studied.

== History ==
=== European settlement ===
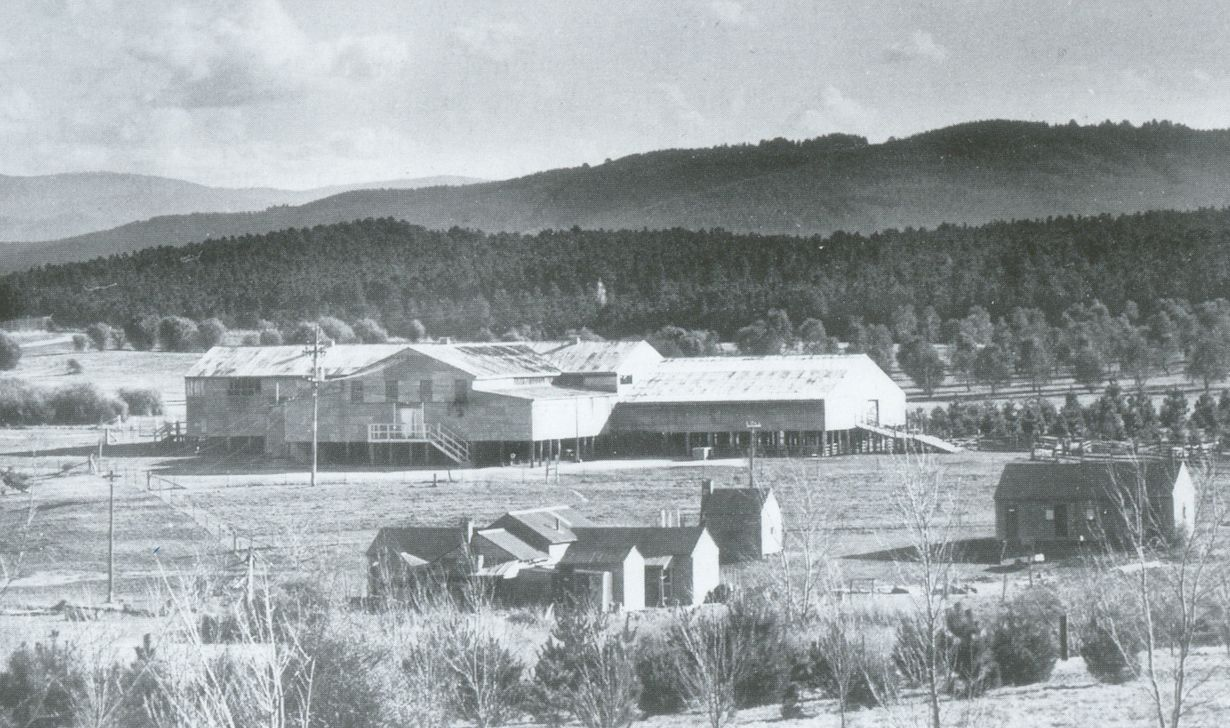
Yarralumla woolshed in 1925

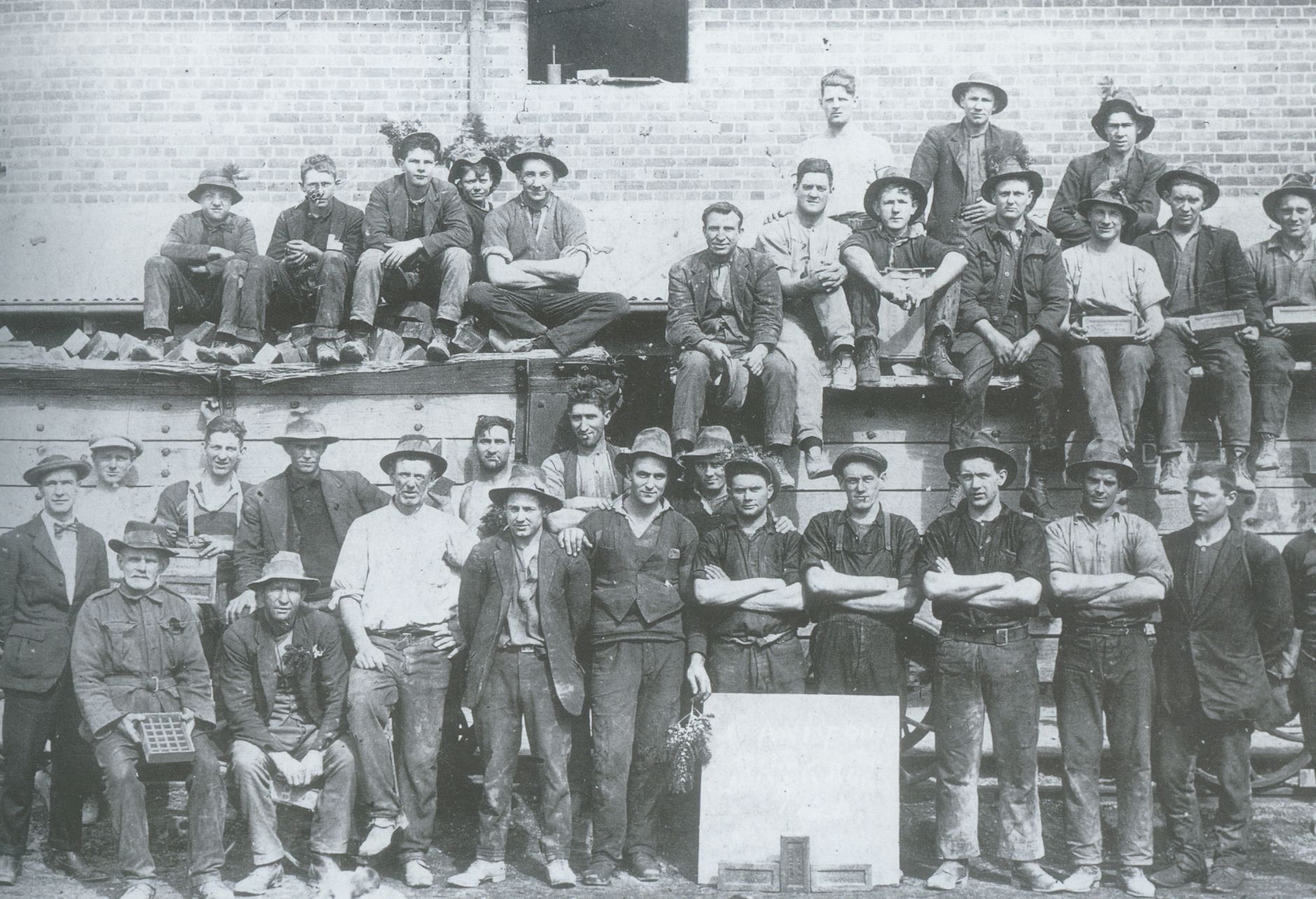
Workers at Yarralumla brickworks in 1924

Like the rest of Canberra, Yarralumla forms part of the traditional lands of the Nymuddy people. The area now called Yarralumla is part of two original land grants made to free settlers for the establishment of farms. In 1828 Henry Donnison, a Sydney merchant who had arrived on the brig Ellen with his wife and family on 29–30 July 1828, was granted an allotment on the western side of West Ridge. He gave it the name Yarralumla which was taken from the Aboriginal name for a steep-sided valley of the Murrumbidgee River near Mount Stromlo. Sometimes spelled Yarrowlumla, the name 'Yarralumla' was first used on a map by the surveyor Robert Dixon in 1829. Donnison's land was named Yarralumla in a survey of the area conducted in 1834, and was a name used by the local people for the Mount Stromlo ridge, which lies to the west of the current suburb, and is said to mean "echo mountain". An area to the west of what is now the suburb was the Yarrolumla parish. A second grant was made to William Klensendorlffe (a German who had served in the British Navy and arrived free in the Colony in 1818), who bought the land from John Stephen on 7 March 1839.

The prominent New South Wales parliamentarian Sir Terence Aubrey Murray (1810–1873) purchased Yarralumla in 1837. He lived there with his wife Mary (née Gibbes, 1817–1858), the second daughter of the Collector of Customs for New South Wales, Colonel John George Nathaniel Gibbes (1787–1873), MLC. Murray settled Yarralumla and part of Winderradeen (near Collector) on his wife in trust so that they would have some property if he became bankrupt. On his wife's death in 1858 Yarralumla passed in trust to her father and her brother Augustus Onslow Manby Gibbes (1828–1897). In May 1859, Augustus' parents came to live with him at Yarralumla homestead.

Augustus Gibbes improved the estate and acquired additional land by purchase and lease. In 1881, he sold Yarralumla for 40,000 pounds to Frederick Campbell, a descendant of Robert Campbell, to travel overseas. Frederick Campbell erected a new, three-storey, brick house on the site of the former Yarralumla homestead at the beginning of the 1890s. Campbell's house would later form the basis of what is now the Governor-General of Australia's official Canberra residence, known colloquially as "Yarralumla" or "Government House". Campbell also built the large wooden Yarralumla Woolshed nearby in 1904.

In 1908, the Limestone Plains area, including Yarralumla, was selected as the site for the capital city of the newly established Commonwealth of Australia and in 1913 the Commonwealth Government purchased the property. Tenant farmers were allowed to stay on the land on annual leases, some remaining until 1963 when the Molonglo River was dammed to form Lake Burley Griffin.

=== Development ===
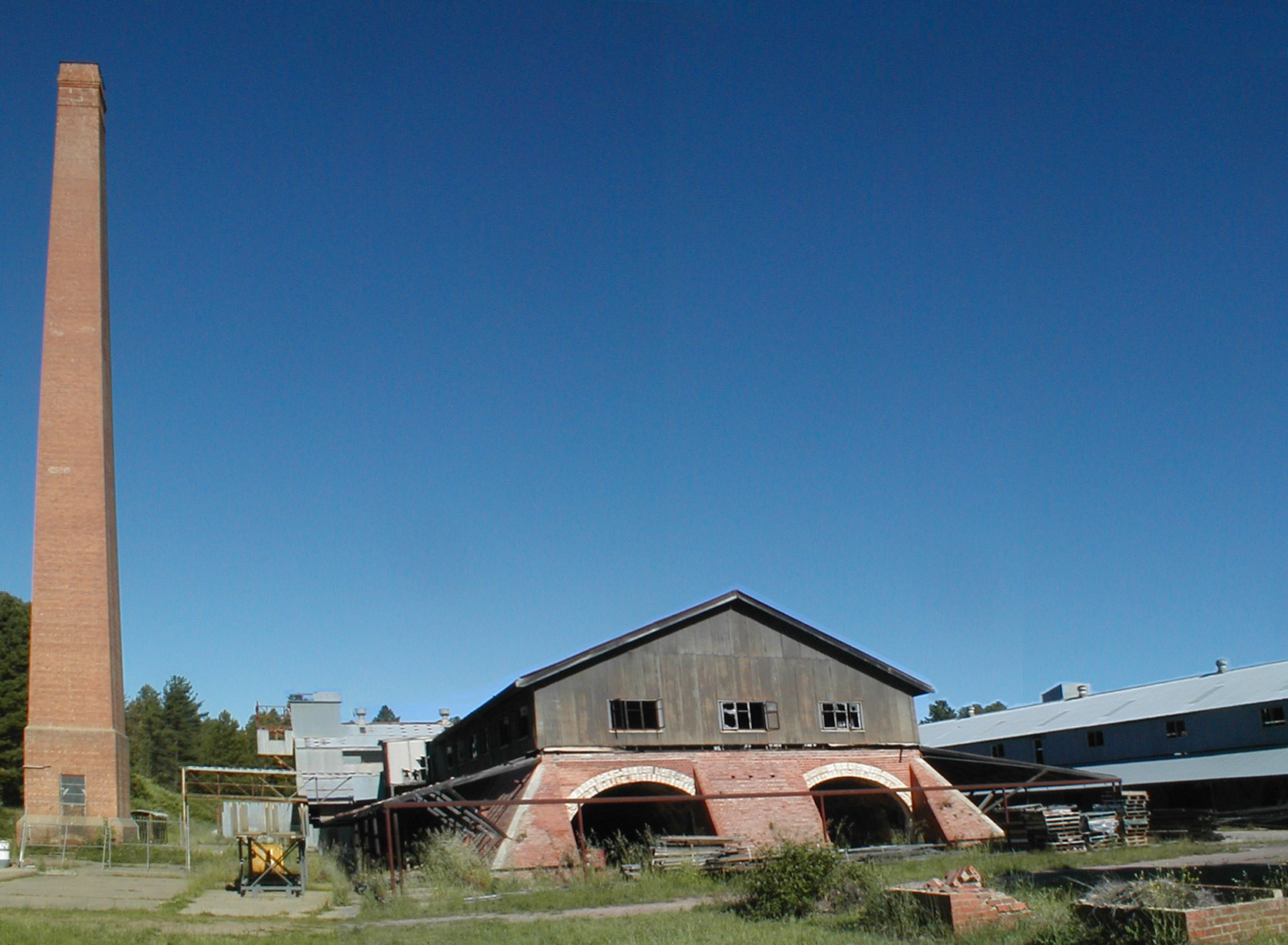
The Yarralumla brickworks in 2006

With the construction of Australia's capital city underway, the Yarralumla brickworks were established in 1913 to supply building material. The bricks were used for many of Canberra's buildings, including the provisional Parliament House. The Brickworks tramway, a 3 ft 6 in (1,067 mm) goods railway, was constructed for the transportation of bricks to some of the major building sites in central Canberra. This linked the brickworks to places such as Parliament House, and the Kingston Power House.

Construction on the Commonwealth nursery and Westbourne Woods arboretum was started in 1914, and a temporary camp was built near the brickworks to accommodate the workers. Thomas Charles Weston was Officer-in-Charge (Afforestation Branch) in the years 1913 to 1926, and later became Director of City Planting and the Superintendent of Parks and Gardens. Weston was responsible for testing and selecting plant species at the arboretum for their suitability to Canberra's environment; from 1913 through to 1924 Weston oversaw the propagation of more than two million trees which were then planted in the Canberra area. Most of the original Westbourne Woods arboretum is now leased to the Royal Canberra Golf Club, with the remainder forming part of Weston Park. The Yarralumla nursery is still active, albeit on a smaller scale and functioning as a retail nursery selling both wholesale and direct to the public.

In 1917, the designer of Canberra, Walter Burley Griffin, named the area surrounding the brickworks "Westridge". It was part of the original Griffin plan, and the objective was to provide a 'horticultural suburb' and a 'society suburb'. In Griffin's 1918 document Canberra: Plan of City and Environs, the suburb is shown as an isosceles triangle with two equal length roads leading from Capital Hill to Yarralumla Bay and Clianthus Centre respectively. The latter road is now to location of the arterial Adelaide Avenue, and Yarralumla Bay and Clianthus Centre was to be joined along a north-south axis by Novar Avenue (originally to be named Mountain Way), extending all the way to the future lake bearing Griffin's name. Griffin's vision was for Westridge to become a business centre with an urban waterfront and promenade, complemented by the bush surroundings. Griffin's design was based on a strict hierarchy with core services such as housing, communal space and facilities such health and education, and commercial space. These would be connected outward by boulevards linking to transport routes and trams. By 1928, there were over 130 people on the electoral roll for Westridge. The majority of the population consisted of men working at the brickworks and nursery. The suburb was gazetted as Yarralumla on 20 September 1928.

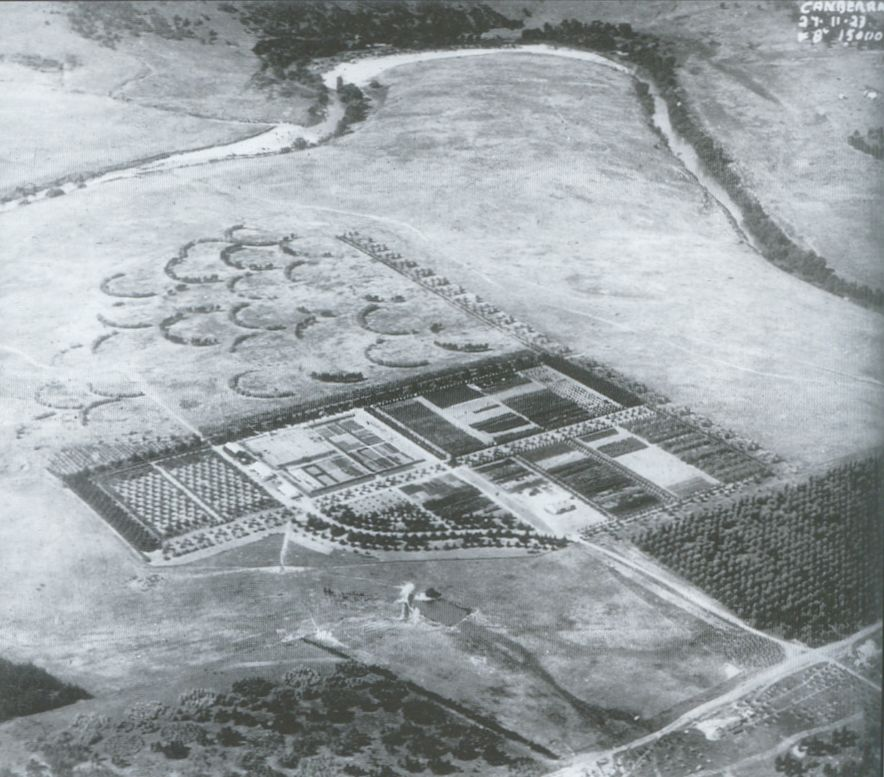
Yarralumla nursery from the air with the Molonglo River in the background, taken in 1923

In 1922, a workers' tent camp was erected on the eastern side of Stirling Ridge to house the men working on the main intercepting sewer. The following year saw the start of the construction of 62 small, four-room, unlined timber cottages, to be used as housing for the married tradesmen involved in the construction of the provisional Parliament House. Other camps were established at the eastern end of Stirling Park on the hills opposite modern Lotus Bay. The first of these was contractor John Howie's settlement (1922–1930), consisting of 25 timber cottages for his married men and timber barracks (Hostel Camp) for his single men. Two other single men's tent camps were established nearby—Old Tradesmen's Camp (1923–1927) and No 1 Labourers Camp (1924–1927). The men from Howie's worked on the Hotel Canberra and the others on the construction of the provisional Parliament House and nearby administrative buildings. The Stirling Park camps were known as Westlake to their new inhabitants, and previously "Gura Bung Dhaura" (stony ground) to the local Aboriginal people. In 1925, the population of this temporary suburb was 700. This represented roughly one-fifth of the total population of the Federal Capital Territory at the time. In 1956, the Department of Interior decided to clear the settlement so that embassies could be built. In 1960, the member of parliament for the ACT, Jim Fraser, described Westlake as one of two "hidden valleys of disgrace, which are never shown to tourists and are seen by visitors only by chance".

The Commonwealth and the states agreed in 1911 that Australia needed adequately-trained foresters, although they did not agree to establish a forestry school until 1920. Prime minister Stanley Bruce promised to fund it during the 1925 election campaign and construction of the Commonwealth Forestry School commenced in 1926 at Westridge near the brickworks and Westbourne Woods. The now heritage-listed Forestry School and the associated principal's residence Westridge House are located on Banks Street, Yarralumla. The school was initially established in March 1926 at the University of Adelaide under the leadership of Charles Lane Poole. After the move to Canberra Lane-Poole acted as principal until 1944. Its permanent building in Yarralumla was designed by Federal Capital Commission architects J.H. Kirkpatrick, and H.M. Rolland. It is built in the Inter-War Stripped Classical style as a single storey rendered brick building with a parapet and a hipped tiled roof. Various Australian woods, including Queensland maple and walnut (Cryptocarya palmerstonii), red cedar, red mahogany, hoop pine and mountain ash, were used throughout the building. It opened in April 1927 and it was completed in June. Due to financial stringency during the Great Depression and other priorities during the Second World War, it had few students in its first years. The Forestry School was absorbed by the Australian National University in 1965 and forestry courses are now carried out at its main campus in Acton. The Commonwealth Scientific and Industrial Research Organisation (CSIRO) Forestry and Forestry Products subsumed the school in 1975. Westridge House, an impressive Tudor-style structure, was completed in January 1928. It underwent a A$500,000 refurbishment and was later used as a residence for the chief officer of the CSIRO. The former Forestry School and Westridge House are now leased out by the CSIRO.

=== After World War II ===
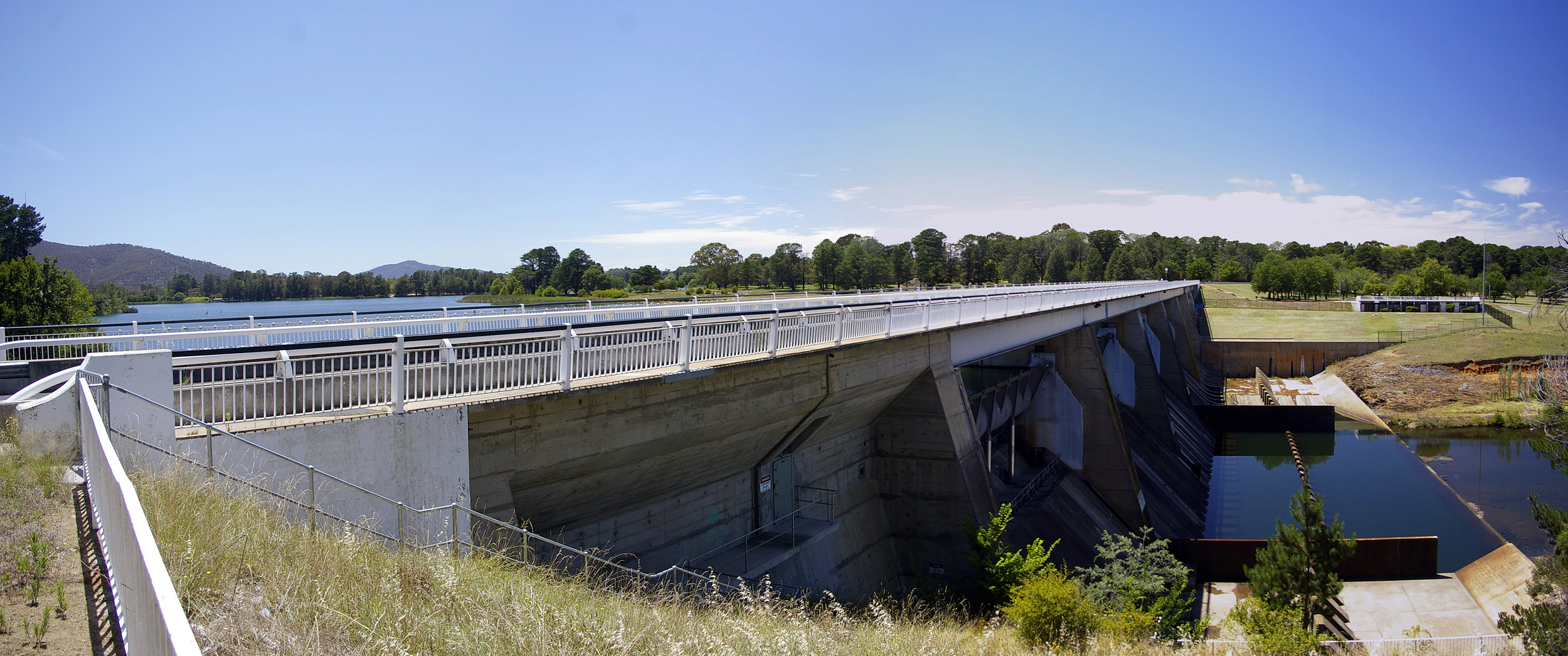
Scrivener Dam

The current geographical boundary of Yarralumla was finalised in the early 1960s with the construction of Scrivener Dam, over which Lady Denman Drive passes, allowing for the Molonglo River to be dammed, creating Lake Burley Griffin. Construction began in September 1960 and the dam was locked on 20 September 1963. The lake reached the planned level on 29 April 1964. On 17 October 1964, Prime Minister Sir Robert Menzies commemorated the filling of the lake. Yarralumla was expanded to include Westlake, which had up until then been part of Acton.

After the Second World War, the suburb began to expand rapidly with the construction of many private homes. Yarralumla's image as a lower-class suburb would persist into the 1960s and 1970s. This general perception began to alter once Lake Burley Griffin had been created and its surrounds landscaped into parklands; the area soon gained a reputation for its attractive lakeside location. During the 1980s, house prices began to rise coincident with a rejuvenation of the suburb. Many of the original government-built monocrete, brick, and weatherboard houses have been demolished and replaced by larger dwellings of a variety of more modern styles and materials, although this process was more advanced in the central part of the suburb than in its east in 2004.

== Demographics ==
The population of the Westridge area on the 1928 electoral roll numbered over 130. At the 2021 census, Yarralumla had a population of 3,120 people. Of these 47.9% were male. The suburb had only 0.9% indigenous Australians, below the national average of 3.2%. The percentage of married people in the suburb was 12 points higher than the national average, and the proportion of residents who had never married was 10 points lower. The higher level of marriage did not translate into a higher level of children; 49.6% of families consisted of a couple without children in the household, compared to the national average of 38.8%. Yarralumla residents had a median age of 50, compared to a Canberra average of 35. The suburb had an older population for a city of young people; the median national age is 38 and 43.5% of Yarralumla residents were 55 or over, compared to the national figure of 29.1%.

Yarralumla is a comparatively wealthy suburb with a 2021 median weekly personal income of $1,591; this compares to the figure of $1,203 for the entire Australian Capital Territory (ACT) and $805 for all of Australia. The public service or defence force employed around 20.8% of the workforce, somewhat less than the ACT average of 22.9%. This compared to 1.8% for Australia as a whole. The higher incomes were derived from the suburb's white-collar base; 68.0% of Yarralumla's workforce was employed as professionals or in managerial posts, compared to 37.7% nationally. In contrast, only 2.9% were engaged in blue-collar occupations, compared with 15.3% for the nation as a whole. The proportion of the population working as tradesmen and technicians was almost four times lower than average across Australia. The proportion of people with a university degree, 57.0%, is higher than the ACT and national averages of 42.9% and 26.3% respectively.

The median monthly housing loan repayments in Yarralumla in 2021 were $3,425, compared to the ACT figure of $2,080 and a federal average of $1,863. At $547, the weekly rent was more than 40% higher than the national average. Yarralumla's median house price was about $1.5m in 2020 versus $1.2m for the inner south and $720,000 for the whole of the ACT. The rate of home ownership in the suburb was 47.8%—much higher than the national average of 31.0%. 23.0% of the households rented. Accommodation was mostly separate houses (65.1%), although the number of residences in the suburb has been increasing through conversion of blocks to dual occupancy and other medium-density-type developments. Despite this, only 7.5% of residences were apartments or units, slightly more than half of the national average.

The population of Yarralumla in 2021 was predominantly Australian-born, with some 67.8% of its residents being born in Australia. The second most prevalent birthplace was England at 5.1%, followed by India and the United States with 2.2% and 2.1% respectively. The suburb was more oriented towards the Anglo-Celtic majority than the rest of Australia; English was spoken at home by 79.3% of the population, compared to the national average of 72.0%. Every other language was spoken by less than 3% of the population. Mandarin, Italian, Hindi, Spanish and Vietnamese were all spoken by at least 0.8% of the population. The most popular religious affiliations in descending order were no religion, Roman Catholic, Anglican and Hindu. The proportion of the population professing to having no religion was 42.5%, higher than the national average of 38.4%, but below the ACT average of 43.5%.

== Suburb amenities ==
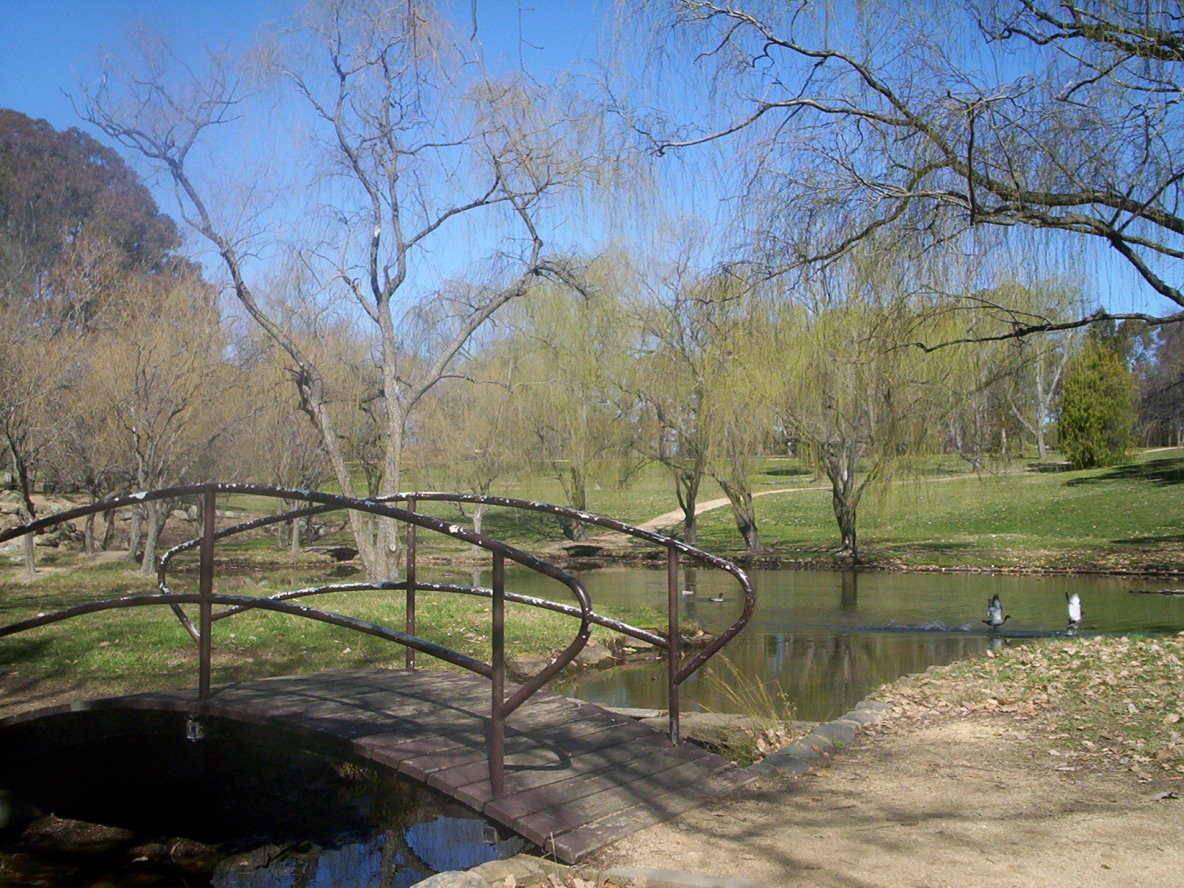
Weston Park

The Yarralumla local shopping centre is located on the corner of Bentham and Novar Streets. It contains a supermarket, dry-cleaners, chemist, gift shop, restaurants and speciality shops.

Weston Park is situated on a peninsula near the western end of Lake Burley Griffin. The park includes swimming areas, children's play equipment and wading pools, and a miniature railway, and is a popular barbecue spot on weekends. Weston Park forms part of a string of parks that line the southern shore of Lake Burley Griffin; other parks include Yarralumla Bay, Lennox Gardens (incorporating a Japanese garden named Canberra Nara Park) and Stirling Park. With its waterfront location on Lake Burley Griffin, Yarralumla Bay is the base of the Canberra Rowing Club, ANU Sailing Club, the Australian Institute of Sport Rowing Centre and the YMCA Sailing Club, while the Southern Cross Yacht Club is based at Lotus Bay opposite Lennox Gardens. Yarralumla Neighbourhood Oval is adjacent to the suburb's primary school as well as a community hall and some tennis courts.

Yarralumla's only scheduled public transport is provided by ACTION buses. Route 57 from Woden Interchange to City Interchange operates along Novar Street, Schlich Street and Hopetoun Circuit. The business case for the proposed second stage of the Capital Metro light rail system that was released in 2019 included stops at Albert Hall on Commonwealth Avenue on the eastern edge of Yarralumla and at the intersections of Adelaide Avenue with Hopetoun Circuit and with Novar and Kent streets on the southern edge.

Yarralumla is home to three places of worship: St Peter Chanel's on the corner of Weston and Loch Streets, Yarralumla Uniting Church on Denman Street, and the Canberra Mosque on Empire Circuit.

== Education ==
Yarralumla's first school, the Catholic St Peter Chanel's Primary School, opened in 1956; it closed in the 1990s. Yarralumla Primary School, a public school, opened in 1957. The Montessori preschool on Loftus Street is a preschool and Little Lodge on Macgillivray Street is a day care facility. There are no secondary schools in Yarralumla. The zoned government high school (Years 7–10) is Alfred Deakin High School in the adjoining suburb of Deakin to the south and the zoned senior secondary college (Years 11–12) is Narrabundah College, several kilometres to the southeast. Nearby private schools are Canberra Girls Grammar School and Canberra Grammar School in Deakin and Red Hill respectively.

The Canberra Japanese Supplementary School Inc., a Japanese weekend educational programme established in 1988, has its school office in the Japanese Embassy Consular Section in Yarralumla, and holds classes at Alfred Deakin High School.

== Politics ==
2025 federal election
Labor	45.52%
Liberal	25.97%
Independent	14.03%
Greens	12.91%
2024 ACT election
Liberal	37.7%
Labor	27.0%
Independent	18.4%
Greens	8.8%

Yarralumla is located within the federal electorate of Canberra, which has been represented by Alicia Payne of the Labor Party in the House of Representatives since the 2019 election. In the ACT Legislative Assembly, Yarralumla is part of the electorate of Murrumbidgee, which elects five members on the basis of proportional representation; as of 2020, the members are two Labor, two Liberal and one Greens. Polling place statistics are shown to the right for the Yarralumla polling place at Yarralumla Primary School at the 2025 federal election and 2024 ACT elections.

== Notable places ==
Yarralumla has a large number of landmarks and places of historical interest. The Governor-General's residence Government House, which shares the name Yarralumla, is located at the western end of the suburb in 53 ha (130 acres) of parkland. It sits alongside Lake Burley Griffin, next to the Royal Canberra Golf Club and Scrivener Dam. The house was built in 1891 as the headquarters for the Yarralumla property. Also located alongside Scrivener Dam is the National Zoo & Aquarium. The nearby Yarralumla woolshed is available for event hire, often playing host to parties and bush dances. The land surrounding the woolshed has been developed as an equestrian park, including areas for showjumping, eventing and endurance riding.

The Yarralumla brickworks were the first industrial manufacturing facility in the ACT; they were closed temporarily several times due to the Great Depression and both World Wars. Proposals to modernise the brickworks were rejected by the National Capital Development Commission in the early 1970s and they closed permanently in 1976; the site is closed to the public and is in a state of disrepair. The unfenced parkland around the brickworks is a popular recreation area for Yarralumla residents. As of 2020, residential development is proposed for the site, which is 42 ha (100 acres), to initially include 1,800 new dwellings, although the project has been scaled down.

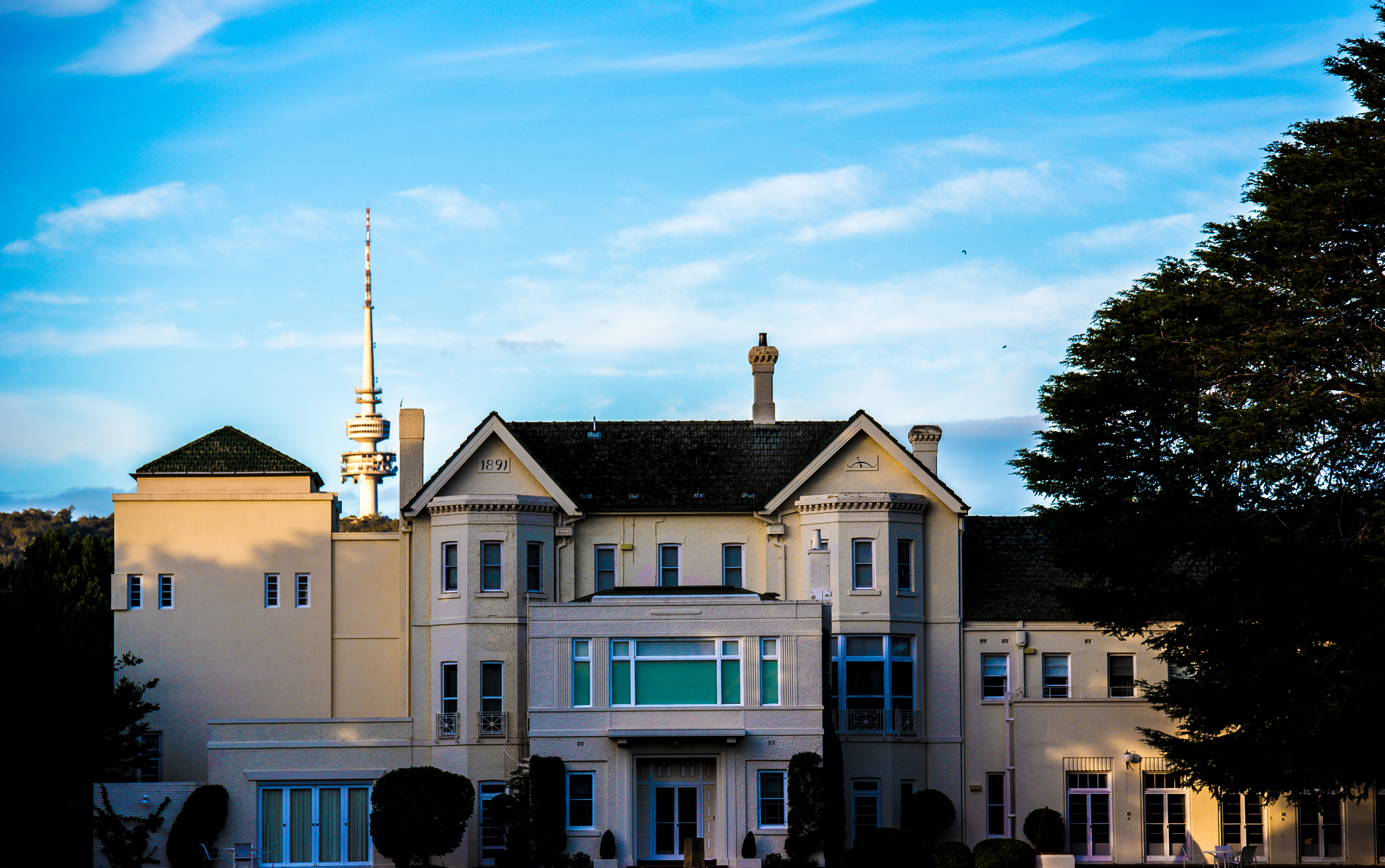
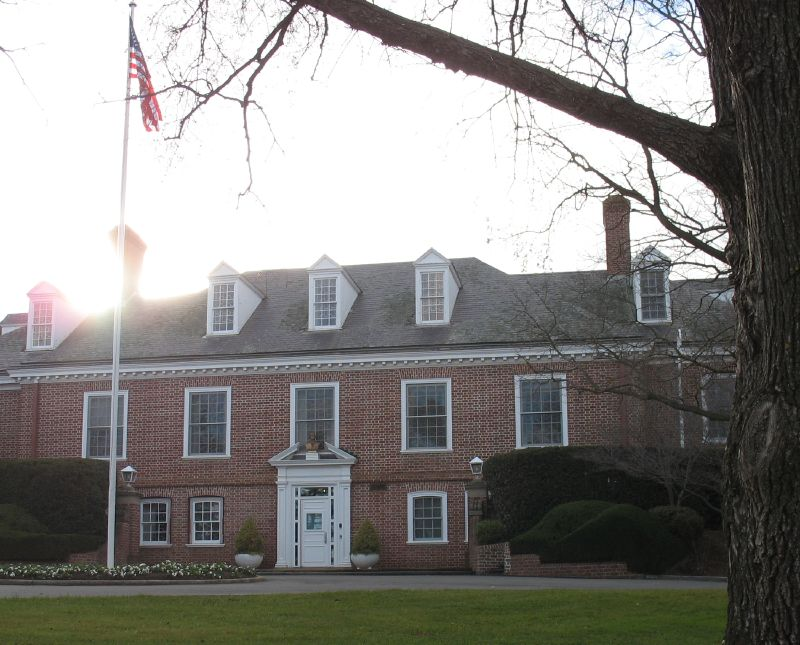
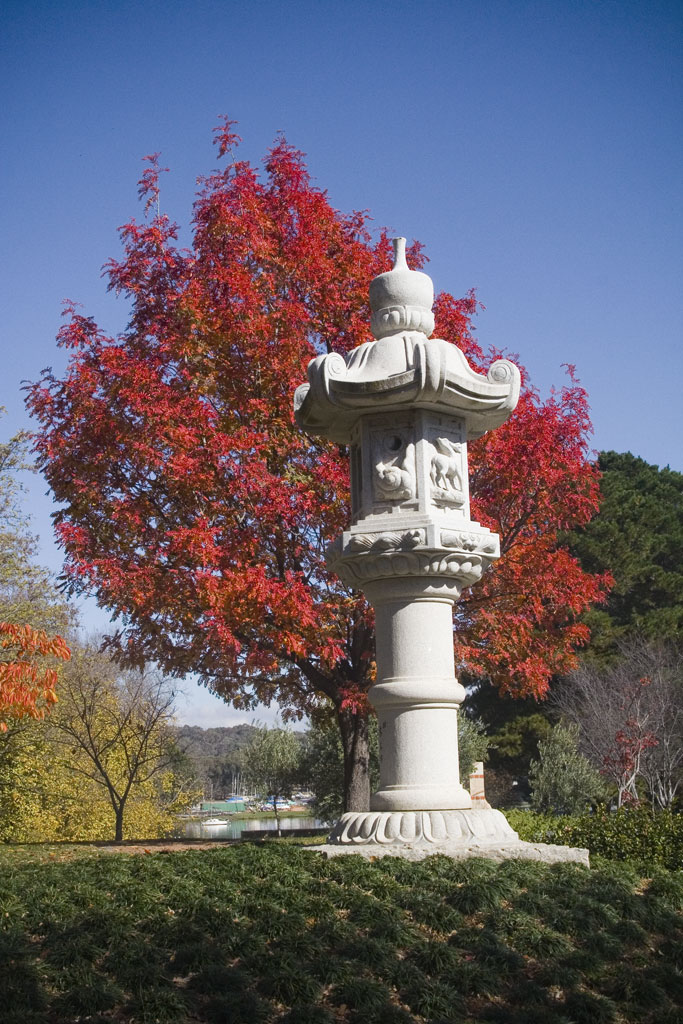
Left to right: (a) Government House; (b) Embassy of the United States, built in the Georgian architectural style; (c) Japanese stone lantern at Lennox Gardens.

The eastern end of Yarralumla is home to many of the diplomatic missions in Canberra, many of which are built in a traditional style reflecting that of their respective home countries. Examples of regionally styled chanceries include the embassies of Saudi Arabia and Thailand, and the High Commissions of India and Papua New Guinea. The United States embassy was the first embassy built in Canberra, with the foundation stone laid on the Fourth of July, 1942. The embassy compound was built in a "typically American" Georgian style, using Australian materials, and was inspired by several buildings designed by Christopher Wren for Virginia at the beginning of the 18th century. The French embassy includes the French-Australian War Memorial opened in 1961, which has a sculpture by André Bizette-Lindet called Winged Victory. Canberra tourist drives take tourists on a car-based tour past many of Canberra's embassies including those located in Yarralumla, zig-zagging through the eastern side of Yarralumla past many of the missions.

The Lennox Gardens, Yarralumla Yacht Club, Albert Hall and the Hotel Canberra are located in the eastern end of the suburb. Located on Commonwealth Avenue, the Hotel Canberra opened in 1924 to accommodate politicians when Parliament was in session; Prime Minister James Scullin stayed there to avoid the running costs of the official residence, The Lodge during the Great Depression. It has been heritage listed as an example of the distinctive Garden-Pavilion style of architect John Smith Murdoch in line with the garden city design of Burley Griffin. The hotel was closed in 1974 and the buildings served as an annexe for Parliament House between 1976 and 1984. The Hyatt Hotel Group re-opened the hotel in 1987. Adjacent to the Canberra Hotel is the Canberra Croquet Club. The only croquet club in Canberra, it was opened in 1928 and was restricted to females until 1975. As with the hotel, the clubhouse was built in federation-style architecture and has been heritage-listed along with the croquet lawns. Immediately to the north of Canberra Hotel on Commonwealth Avenue is Albert Hall, built in 1927, which was in the early years of Canberra, one of the main centres of social, musical, theatrical, ceremonial and artistic activity in the capital. It was opened by Prime Minister Stanley Bruce and the subject of royal visits. Although its functionality has been superseded by more specialised entertainment and cultural institutions built in modern times, it is still frequently used for community events. It has been heritage listed for its social and historical value, and as an example of early Canberra architecture.

Embassies and High Commissions in Yarralumla
Belgium	Brazil	Canada	China	Egypt	Estonia	Finland
France	Germany	Greece	India	Indonesia	Ireland	Israel
Japan	South Korea	Malaysia	Mexico	Myanmar	Netherlands	New Zealand
Nigeria	Norway	Pakistan	Papua New Guinea	Philippines	Poland	Saudi Arabia
Singapore	South Africa	Spain	Sri Lanka	Sweden	Thailand	Turkey
United Kingdom	United States					

== See also ==
- History of Canberra
