= Westbourne Woods =

Arboretum in Canberra, Australian Capital Territory

- Location within Australian Capital Territory
- Coordinates: 35°17′55″S 149°05′04″E

Westbourne Woods is an area of exotic tree plantings in the Canberra suburb of Yarralumla in the Australian Capital Territory.

The woods were established by Thomas Weston as an experimental planting area in 1913 and cover 120 hectares (300 acres). The names of the woods comes from Walter Burley Griffin's original name for the area. Trees were planted in holes blasted with dynamite, and Weston discovered that trees planted in blasted holes did much better than those planted in hand dug holes, probably due to the fracturing effect of the blast. By the end of 1920, George Weston's team of planters had put in 44,900 exotic trees. The woods is on the ACT Heritage Register.
