= Yarralumla brickworks =

One of the earliest construction projects in Canberra, Australia

Coordinates: 35°18′30″S 149°5′26″E

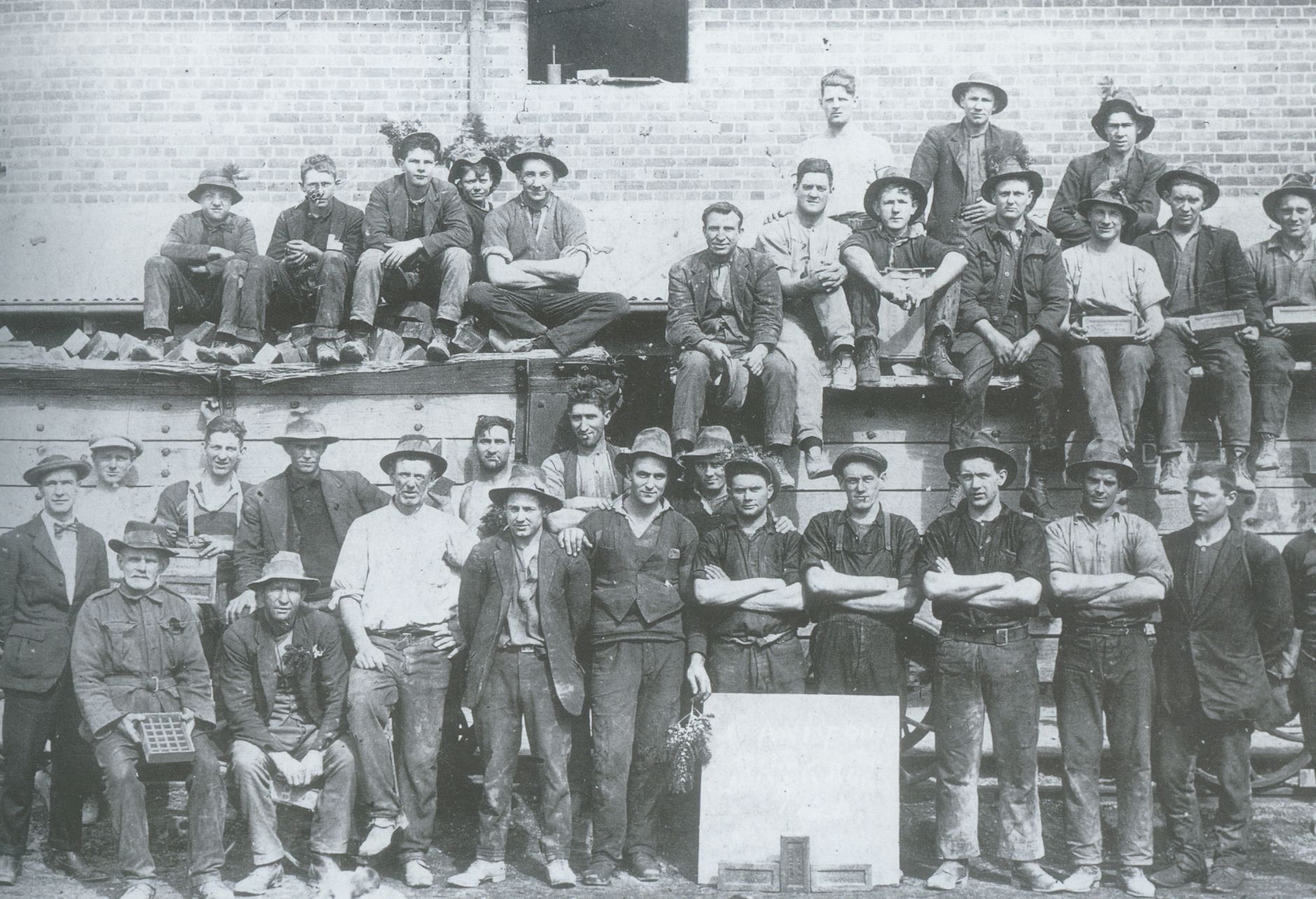
Workers at Yarralumla Brickworks in 1924

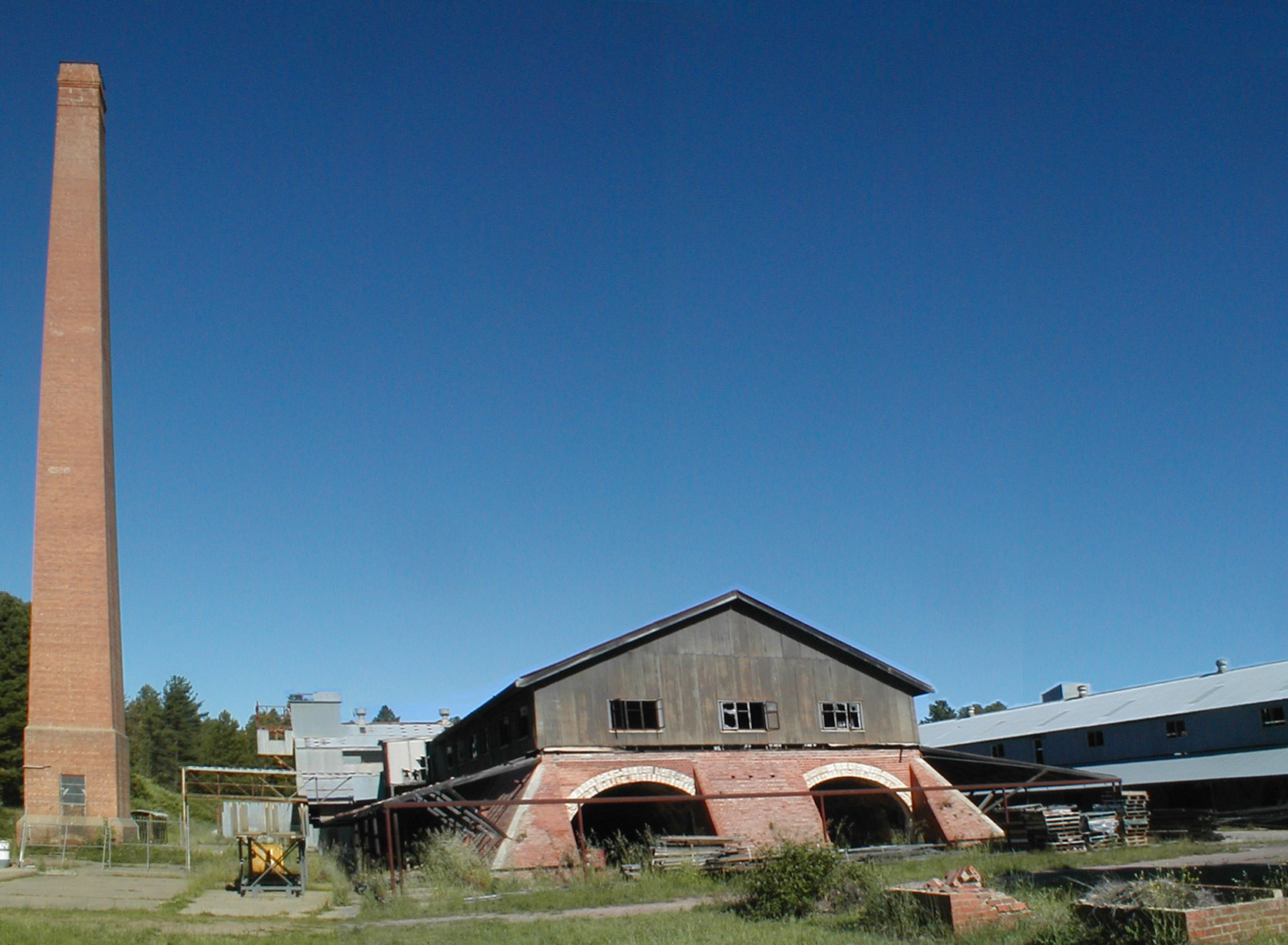
The tall chimney and newest kiln

The Yarralumla brickworks, also known as the Commonwealth Brickworks, was one of the earliest construction projects in Canberra, Australia. It was built in the suburb of Yarralumla to produce the bricks used to build many of Canberra's early buildings. It opened in around 1913 and operated until its closure in 1976. It is known for producing the bricks used to build itself. Narrow gauge goods railway lines for the transportation of bricks linked Yarralumla to some of the major building sites in central Canberra such as Old Parliament House, and the Kingston Power House. No sign of this early Canberra transport system remains today.

The original brick kilns were built according to Walter Burley Griffin's designs with fan forced short chimneys intended to stay below the height of the surrounding pine trees. In 1950 after World War II increased building demands in Canberra meant that a large 46 metre natural-draft chimney was built for the new kilns. This greatly increased brick production capacity. The tall chimney is visible from many locations around central Canberra.

In recent years a report found that the tall chimney was not earthquake-safe. As the chimney was heritage listed and located within falling distance of nearby homes, an engineering firm was called in to make it safe. A frame was built inside the chimney to support it without affecting its external appearance.

The brickworks today is closed to the public, but has had various uses over the past 20 years. There have been several recent ideas that haven't eventuated, including using the site for Canberra's new jail, making the site the new permanent home for Floriade (a yearly Canberra flower festival) or to turn the brickworks into a holiday resort. Future plans for the site are still undecided. As of February 2015 it was proposed that a housing estate could be constructed on the site, consisting of 1800 dwellings.
