= Westlake, Australian Capital Territory =

Former settlement in Australia

Coordinates: 35.3022961°S 149.1143121°E

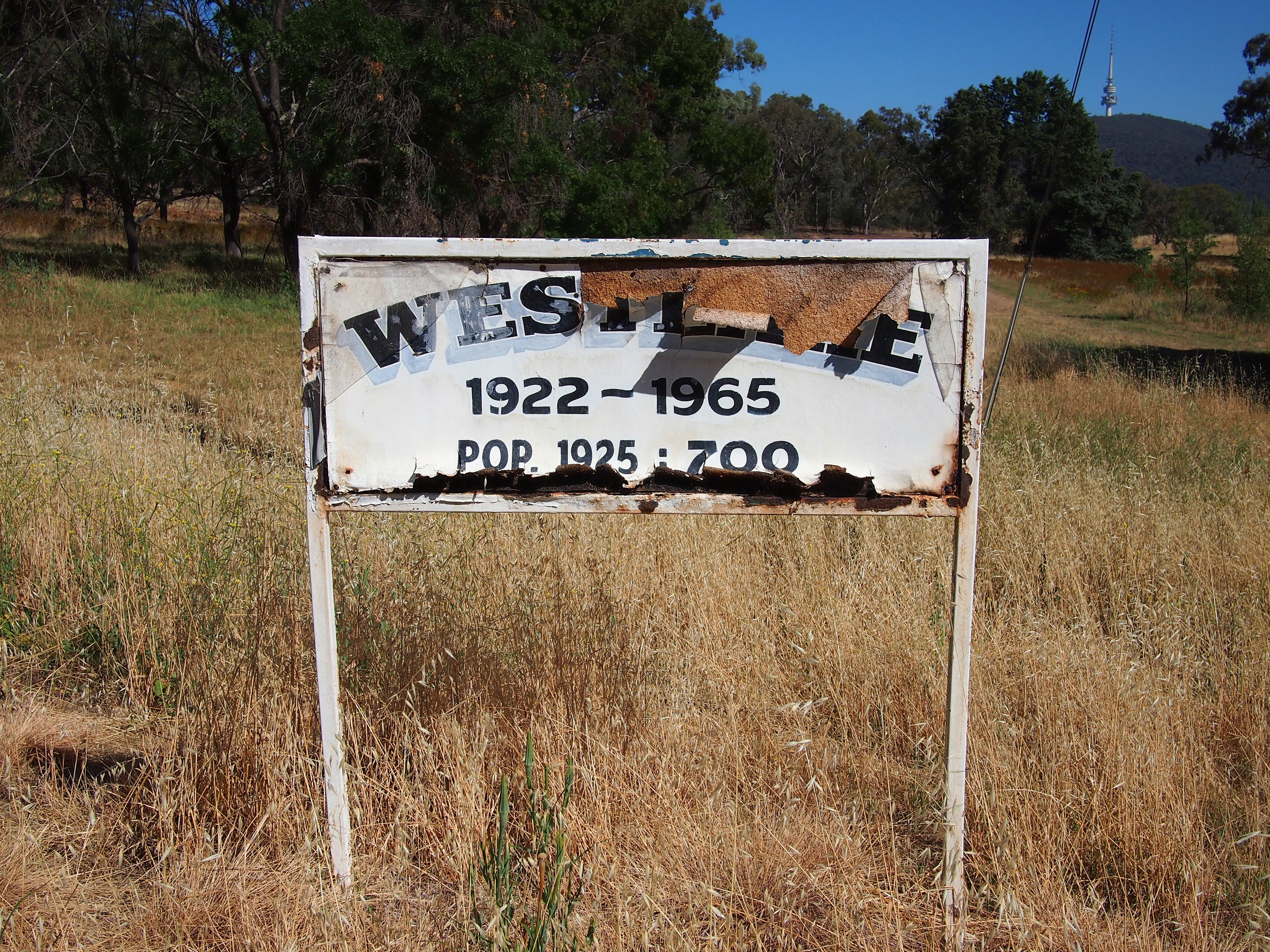
The sign marking the location of the former workers' camp at Westlake

Westlake was a temporary settlement on the outskirts of Yarralumla, Australian Capital Territory, and was a suburb of Canberra from 1922 until 1965. Westlake was built in Stirling Park to accommodate workers before its constructions and buildings were removed by 1965, though remnants remain visible. At its peak it had a population of around 700.

In 2014, Pip Buining and Louise Morris created a theatrical event called Anthology celebrating the township. She says "the site is Ngunnawal land, guru bung dhaura (stony ground) a traditional pathway, and from the 1920s was the site of one of the camps created to house the workers building the new city of Canberra. Tents and a hall were erected at Westlake followed by 61 temporary cottages, designed by architect H. M. Rolland and built in 1923, for married tradesmen, and their families, who came to Canberra to build the infrastructure for the new Federal Capital of Australia." She continues "Westlake was planned and built. Families were moved in, went to work, built friendships, got married, had children, created gardens, held funerals. The temporary suburb became a community. But when it had served its purpose and the workers were no longer required, the houses were sold off one by one and taken away on the backs of trucks. Westlake was erased."

Remnants of the suburb remain in Stirling Park, an area bounded by Alexandrina Drive, Fitzgerald Street and Empire Circuit. The area is close to embassies in Yarralumla and to bushland adjacent to Lake Burley Griffin.
