= Canberra Peace Park =

Park in Canberra, Australia

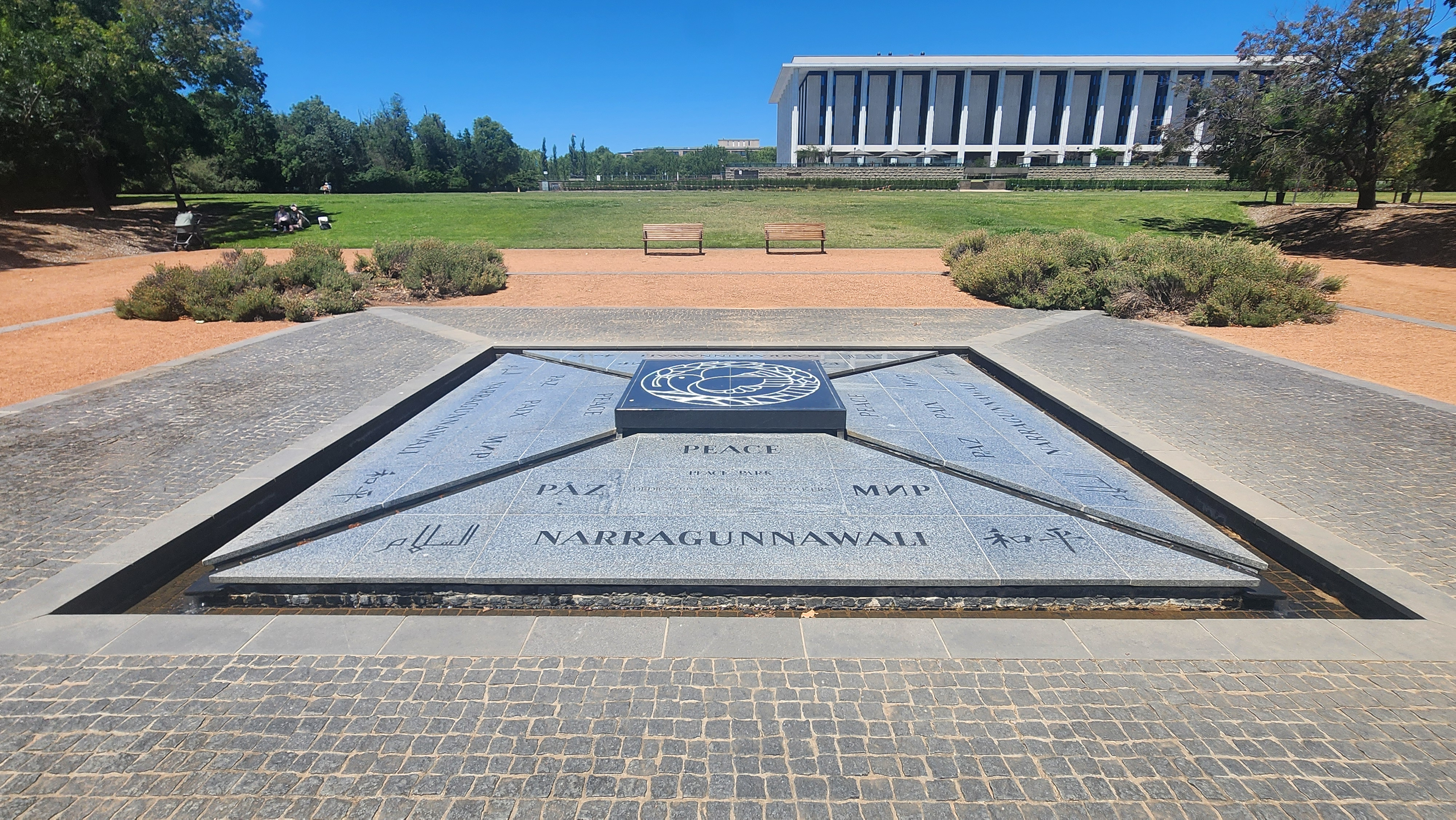
- Canberra Peace Park, beside the National Library of Australia (background)
- Interactive map of Canberra Peace Park
- Location: Parkes, Australian Capital Territory
- Coordinates: 35.2955°S 149.1313°E
- Manager: National Capital Authority

The Canberra Peace Park or Peace Park is beside Lake Burley Griffin between the lake and the National Library of Australia, in Canberra, the national capital of Australia. It is not to be confused with the Canberra-Nara Peace Park nearby (see Lennox Gardens).

It was built in 1986, the United Nations Year of Peace.

The park has three bordered zones. The central zone has with a square granite plinth with a peace symbol in it, surrounded by a quartered plinth incised with the word Peace written in the official languages of the United Nations and also the language of the local Ngunnawal people, and a statement of dedication. This is bordered by a water way fountain, and a cobbled granite walk way, with formal gardens of lavender at each corner.

The monument was unveiled by the Bill Hayden, the Governor General of Australia, on 24 October 1990.

The monument's statement of dedication asks, "All who visit here are invited to commit themselves to peace and the elimination of weapons of mass destruction."
