= Weston Park, Canberra =

Park in Canberra, Australia

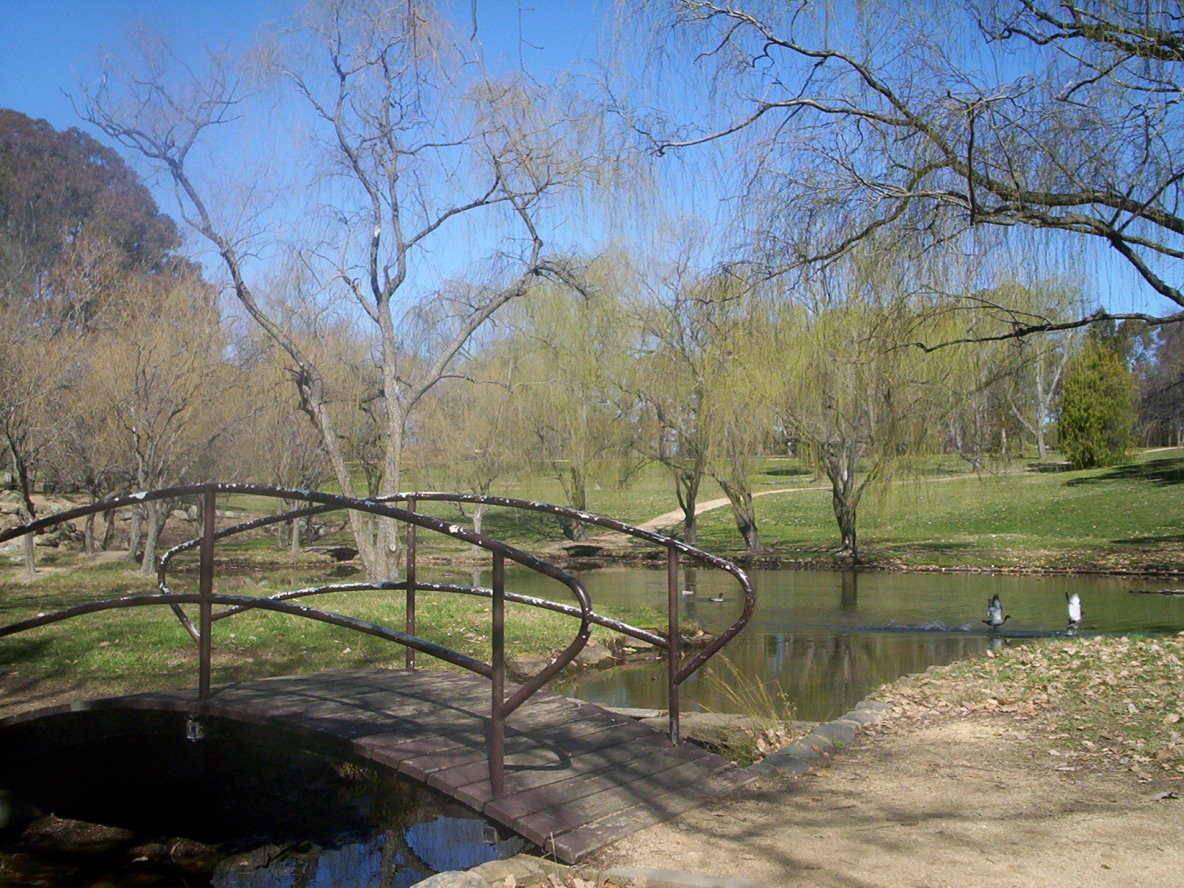
- Weston Park
- Interactive map of Weston Park, Canberra
- Location: Yarralumla, Australian Capital Territory
- Coordinates: 35°17′25″S 149°5′36″E

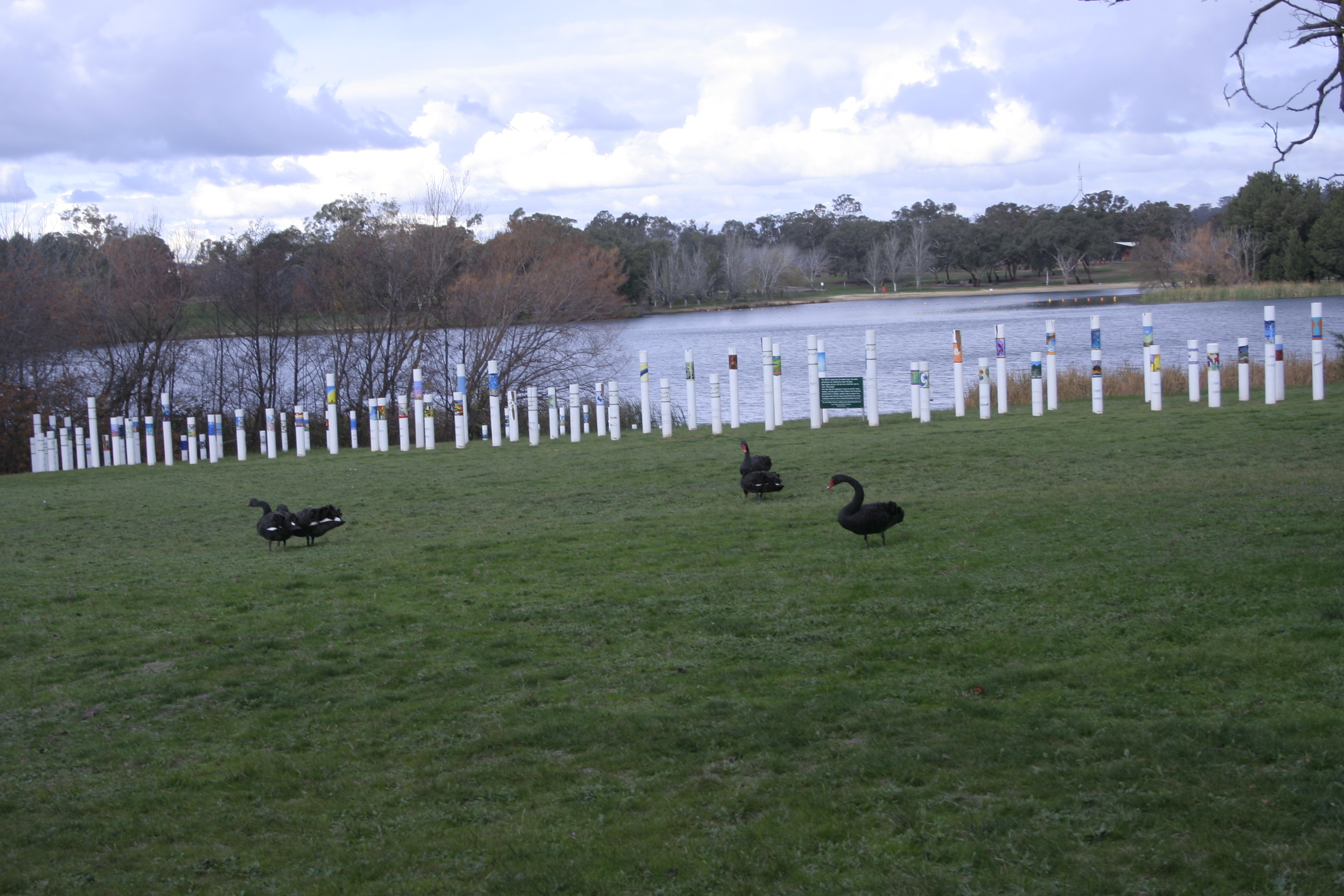
Black swans at SIEV X monument

Weston Park is a park located on a peninsula on the western side of Lake Burley Griffin in Canberra, Australia. In 1963 the park was named after Charles Weston, who had founded the nearby Yarralumla Nursery in 1914. On the western side of the peninsula is Yarramundi Reach and on the eastern side is Tarcoola Reach. The end of the peninsula is called Kurrajong Point.

With water on three sides, children's playgrounds, picnic areas and barbecue facilities, Weston Park has a very pleasant atmosphere and is very popular on weekends and holidays. The park also has a miniature railway.
