= Government House, Canberra =

Official residence of the Governor-General of Australia

Government House
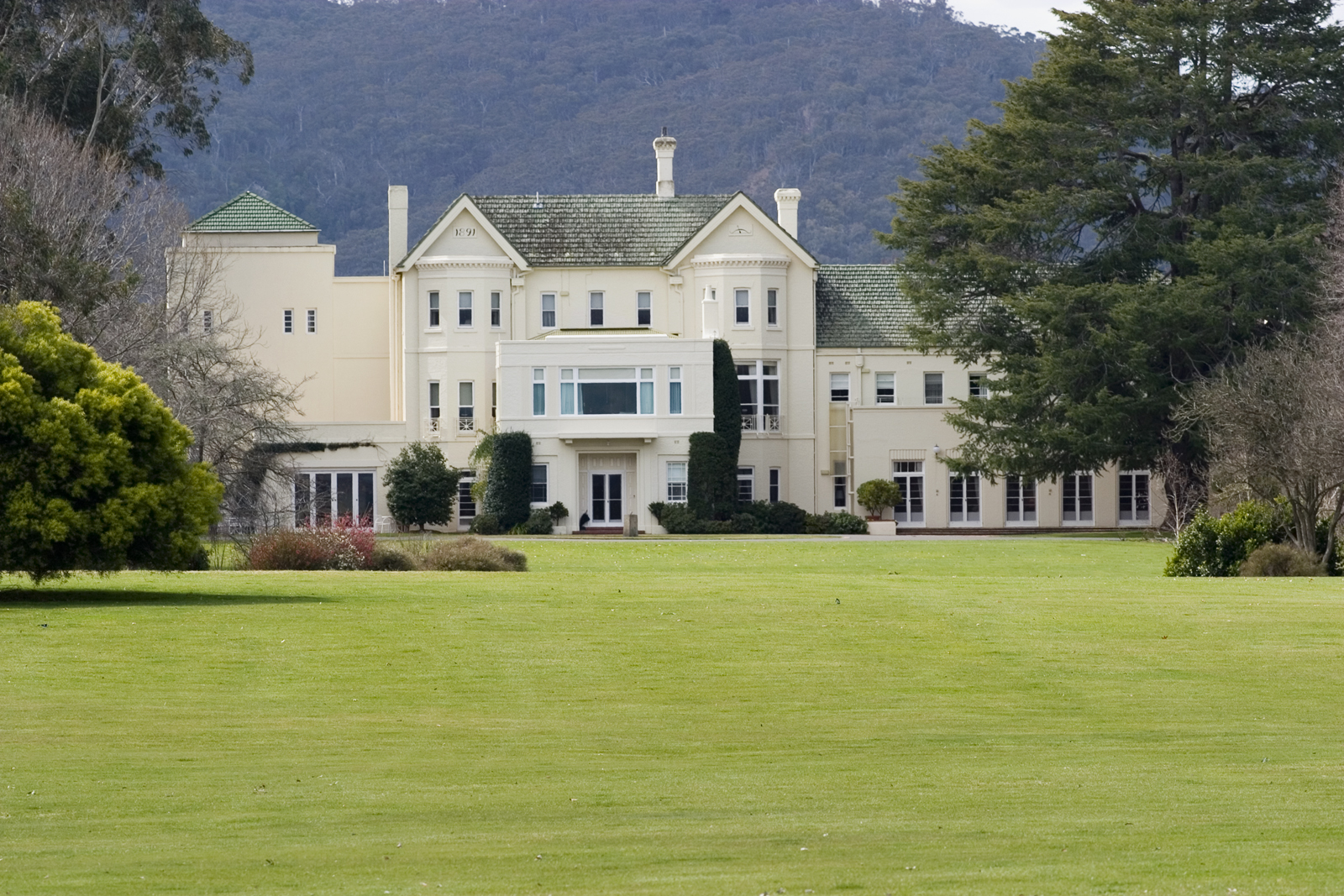
- Government House, viewed garden side
- Interactive map of the Government House area
- Alternative names: Yarralumla

General information
- Status: Completed
- Type: Official residence
- Architectural style: Colonial Georgian revival; Inter-war Stripped Classical
- Location: Yarralumla, Australian Capital Territory, Australia
- Coordinates: 35°18′06″S 149°04′40″E
- Current tenants: Governor-General of Australia, presently Sam Mostyn AC
- Construction started: 1832
- Renovated: 1891; 1927; 1939; 1990s
- Client: Frederick Campbell (grazier)
- Owner: Commonwealth of Australia

Technical details
- Grounds: 54 hectares (130 acres)

Design and construction
- Other designers: Ruth Lane Poole (interiors and furniture); Charles Weston (gardens)

Renovating team
- Architects: John Smith Murdoch (1927); E. H. Henderson (1939); Roger Pegrum (1990s)

Commonwealth Heritage List
- Official name: Yarralumla and Surrounds, Dunrossil Dr, Yarralumla, ACT, Australia
- Type: Listed place
- Criteria: A., B., E., F., G., H.
- Designated: 22 June 2004
- Reference no.: 105381

Government House, colloquially known as Yarralumla, is the official residence of the governor-general of Australia. It is located in the suburb of Yarralumla in the Australian capital city of Canberra, in the Australian Capital Territory. The main residence is set amid 54 hectares (130 acres) of parkland. The house and its associated grounds were added to the Commonwealth Heritage List on 22 June 2004.

At Government House, the governor-general of Australia presides over meetings of the Federal Executive Council, and holds investitures to present honours within the Order of Australia and associated Australian military, bravery and civil decorations. The governor-general also receives visiting heads of state and other dignitaries and the credentials of ambassadors to Australia, and entertains people from all walks of life. The Monarch of Australia also uses Government House when they are in Canberra.

== History ==
American architect Walter Burley Griffin included provision for an impressive, purpose-built Government House in his plans for the modern city of Canberra. It was to be placed in a dedicated government precinct and provided with scenic views taking in Canberra's landscaped open spaces and central lake; but, as with so much of Burley Griffin's planning for the national capital, financial considerations intervened and the envisaged work never eventuated.

The core part of the current vice-regal structure began life as a double-gabled Victorian-era house, erected in 1891 by grazier Frederick Campbell (grandson of politician Robert Campbell) at what was then the hub of a working sheep station. Previously, the site taken up by the present-day Government House was occupied by an elegant, Georgian-style homestead with shady verandahs on two sides, a shingle-clad roof and rows of French windows replete with shutters. The original single-storey homestead had been continuously occupied by the interrelated Murray and Gibbes families from 1837 through to the end of 1881.

=== Private ownership ===
Following the entry of European explorers into the Limestone Plains area, pastoralists followed during the 1820s, and Johnston and Taylor were the first to graze stock in the Yarralumla area. A grant of the land was made to Henry Donnison in 1828, but he soon sold it to William Dawes who in turn sold it to Francis Mowatt in 1832. Mowatt established an agricultural and dairying property and built a homestead. In 1837 Terence Aubrey Murray and Thomas Walker acquired the property. Walker subsequently left the partnership and Murray increased the size of Yarralumla. He held large grazing lands in the Lake George area and became a Member of the Legislative Assembly in the 1840s. As a member of the Legislative Assembly, Murray served as a minister in the New South Wales Government, and was appointed President of the New South Wales Legislative Council in 1862. Murray planted the Himalayan or Deodar Cedar at Yarralumla around 1840, and decorative shrubs and trees among the native eucalypts that dotted the homestead's curtilage.

Augustus Onslow Manby "Gussie" Gibbes purchased the Yarralumla sheep station and its homestead from his brother-in-law, Sir Terence Aubrey Murray, on 1 July 1859 for approximately £20,000. (Note: The purchase price was to be paid in 12 instalments; see NSW Land Titles' Office, old system deeds, book 81, number 300.) "Gussie" Gibbes made improvements to the property and as well as running extensive flocks of sheep on the estate, he bred horses for the Indian market and collected land rents from tenant farmers.

Gussie Gibbes' health declined during the early 1880s. He sold his rural holdings and travelled overseas for an extended period with his niece and housekeeper, Leila Murray. On 8 November 1881, Frederick Campbell — who had been managing the neighbouring Duntroon sheep station for his uncle and aunt — purchased Yarralumla from his friend Gibbes for £40,000. (Note: Campbell made a £10,000 down-payment on the property, discharging the rest of the purchase price by instalments in a process that took him until 1911 to complete: see NSW LTO, old system deeds, book 607, number 942.)

Campbell was of the athletic type, actively involved on the playing field in the early years of Australia's first rugby union clubs Wallaroo Football Club and Sydney University Football Club. As a married man with a growing family that needed to be accommodated, he partially demolished the old Yarralumla homestead in 1890 and, the following year, finished building a three-storey, red-brick house on the site. (Note: NSW Government land-title records show that Campbell borrowed money from Gibbes (and from another one of Gibbes' brothers-in-law, Augustus Berney, a Sydney-based Customs Department officer) to help pay for the building project.) In 1899, Campbell razed what was left of the original homestead, replacing it with a substantial brick extension to the main house. An impressive wooden shearing shed was also built by Campbell in the 1890s to service Yarralumla's flocks of sheep. The shearing shed is situated near the banks of the Molonglo River, below the Scrivener Dam.

=== Government House ===
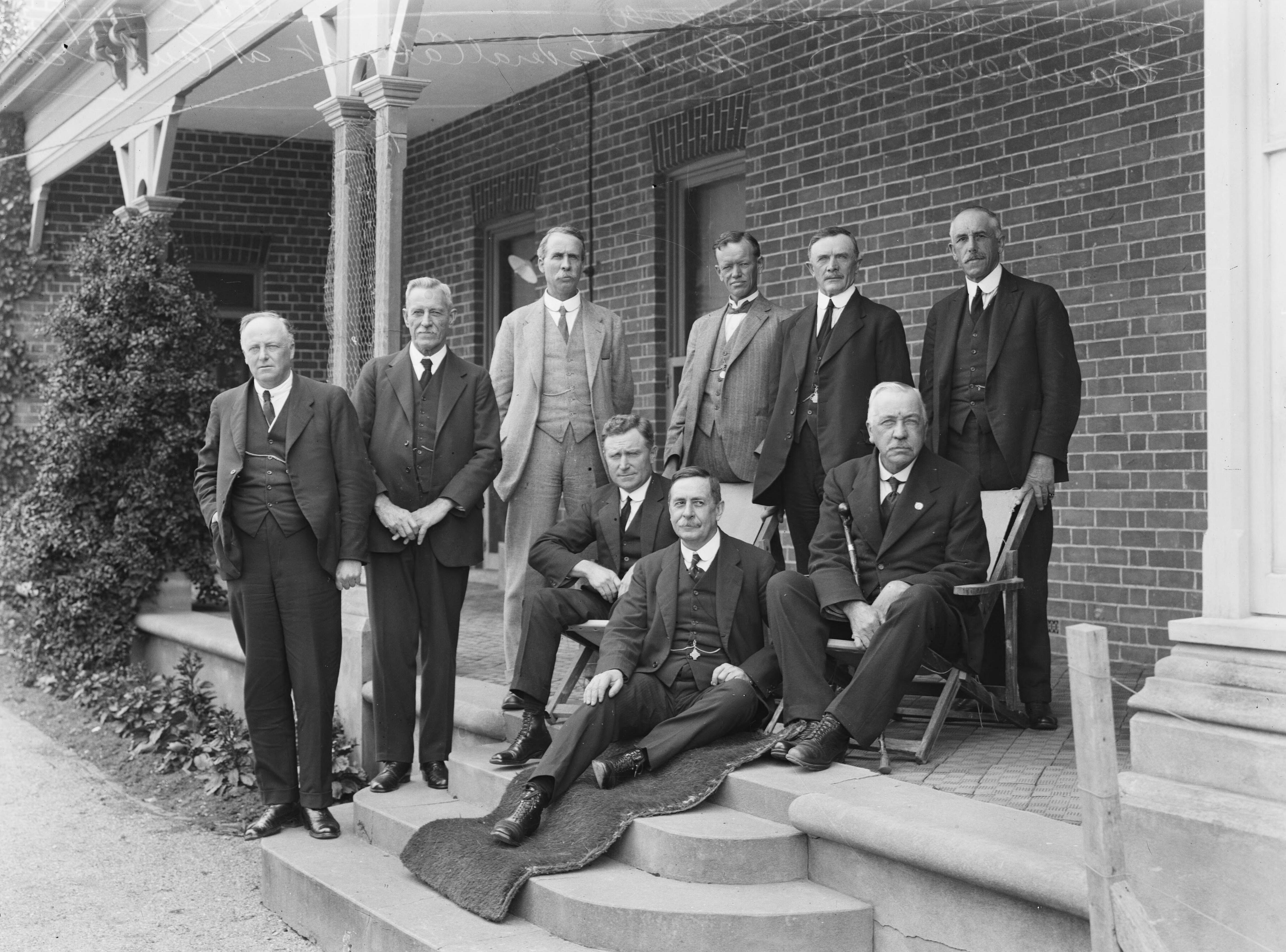
Members of the First Bruce Ministry at Government House in January 1924. This was the first cabinet meeting to take place in Canberra.

The Commonwealth Government bought the Yarralumla estate from Campbell in 1913. It decided to use Campbell's vacated home as a temporary residence for the governor-general of Australia. Consequently, another three-storey block was erected behind the existing one and a new entrance hall was constructed on the southern frontage. A stable block was constructed to the west of the structure and cottages built for staff. For a period of time, the house was used as the residence of John Goodwin, the officer-in-charge of the Federal Capital Territory. Since the 1920s, the building has been extended and refurbished several more times, but the basic structure of the 1891 house can still be seen clearly when viewed from the south.

Lord Stonehaven was the first governor-general to live in the house, being in attendance at the opening of the new Provisional Parliament House (now Old Parliament House) in Canberra in 1927. Australian-born Sir Isaac Isaacs was the first governor-general to live at Government House for the entirety of his term. The house remained relatively small when compared to Government House in Melbourne, and successive governors-general and their wives complained about its inadequacies as a place for formal entertaining. Plans for a much grander — and permanent — vice-regal residence were never implemented as a consequence of the economic hardship caused by the Great Depression of the late 1920s and 1930s. The grave crisis posed to Australia's security during the Second World War also halted further work.

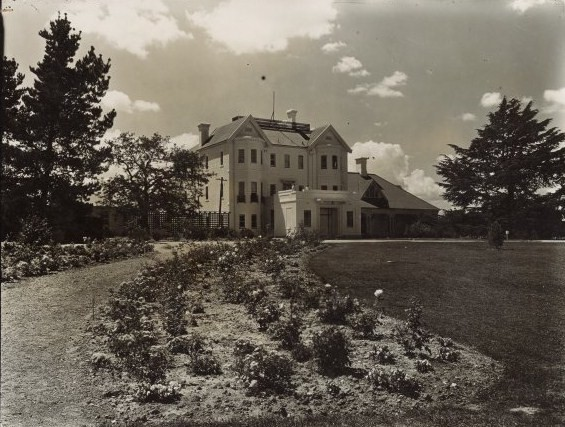
Government House in 1927. Lord Stonehaven was the first governor-general to reside at Yarralumla, moving into the residence that year.

Due to the First World War and the adverse post-war economic conditions that prevailed in its immediate wake, the federal government did not move to Canberra from Melbourne until 1927. It was only at this time that the governor-general began to use Yarralumla as his official seat, albeit on a limited basis at first. However, the Federal Cabinet did meet at Government House (then known as Yarralumla House) on 30 January 1924, on that occasion chaired by the acting Prime Minister, Earle Page. This was still three years before the opening of Parliament House and Canberra becoming the National Capital. Between 1927 and 1930 the governor-general continued to live principally at Melbourne's Government House, residing at Yarralumla only during those periods of the year when the Parliament of Australia was sitting. In 1930, Melbourne's Government House was finally returned to the Victorian State Government for use by the Governor of Victoria.

In 1927, the Duke and Duchess of York (later King George VI and Queen Elizabeth) stayed in the house when they visited Canberra to open the Provisional Parliament House. Prior to their arrival, extensive improvements were made to ensure that the building would provide a standard of accommodation appropriate for members of the royal family. These improvements were overseen by the then Commonwealth Architect, John Smith Murdoch. The interiors of the refurbished house, along with much of their furniture, were designed by Ruth Lane Poole, of the Federal Capital Commission. They are in keeping with the prevailing Inter-war Stripped Classical style, with more formal interiors provided for the official reception rooms, and a lighter scheme prevailing in the private residential rooms. (Note: Ruth Lane Poole was also responsible for the interiors of The Lodge — the official residence of the Prime Minister.)

A private sitting room was built in 1933 at the request of Lady Isaacs over the south entrance porch, which looks south across the gardens to the Brindabella Ranges and the foothills of the Australian Alps beyond.

In 1939, Government House was again extensively renovated and expanded in the Inter-war Stripped Classical style typical of Canberra's early public buildings, to a design by E. H. Henderson, Chief Architect of the Works and Services Branch of the Department of the Interior. Lord Gowrie lived in the residence at this time, and it was not regarded as being large enough to meet the demands made of it. The 1899 Campbell extension was therefore demolished and a new, more substantial replacement erected. The drawing room was made larger, while more bedrooms were installed on the second storey, and a "state entrance" built on the northern side. Further alterations to the existing building were also made, adding a nursery on the third-storey and extending the dining room.

All these changes to Yarralumla had been spurred by the impending appointment of Prince George, Duke of Kent as the next governor-general. He was due to succeed Lord Gowrie in early 1945. However, the Duke died in an aircraft crash in Scotland in 1942 while on active service in World War II, and his elder brother, Prince Henry, Duke of Gloucester, was appointed in his place. The changes were completed in time for the arrival of the Duke and Duchess of Gloucester.

In the 1990s, a new chancery building, designed by Roger Pegrum in an Inter-war Stripped Classical design, was constructed to house the offices of the Official Secretary to the Governor-General and associated administrative staff.

== Grounds ==
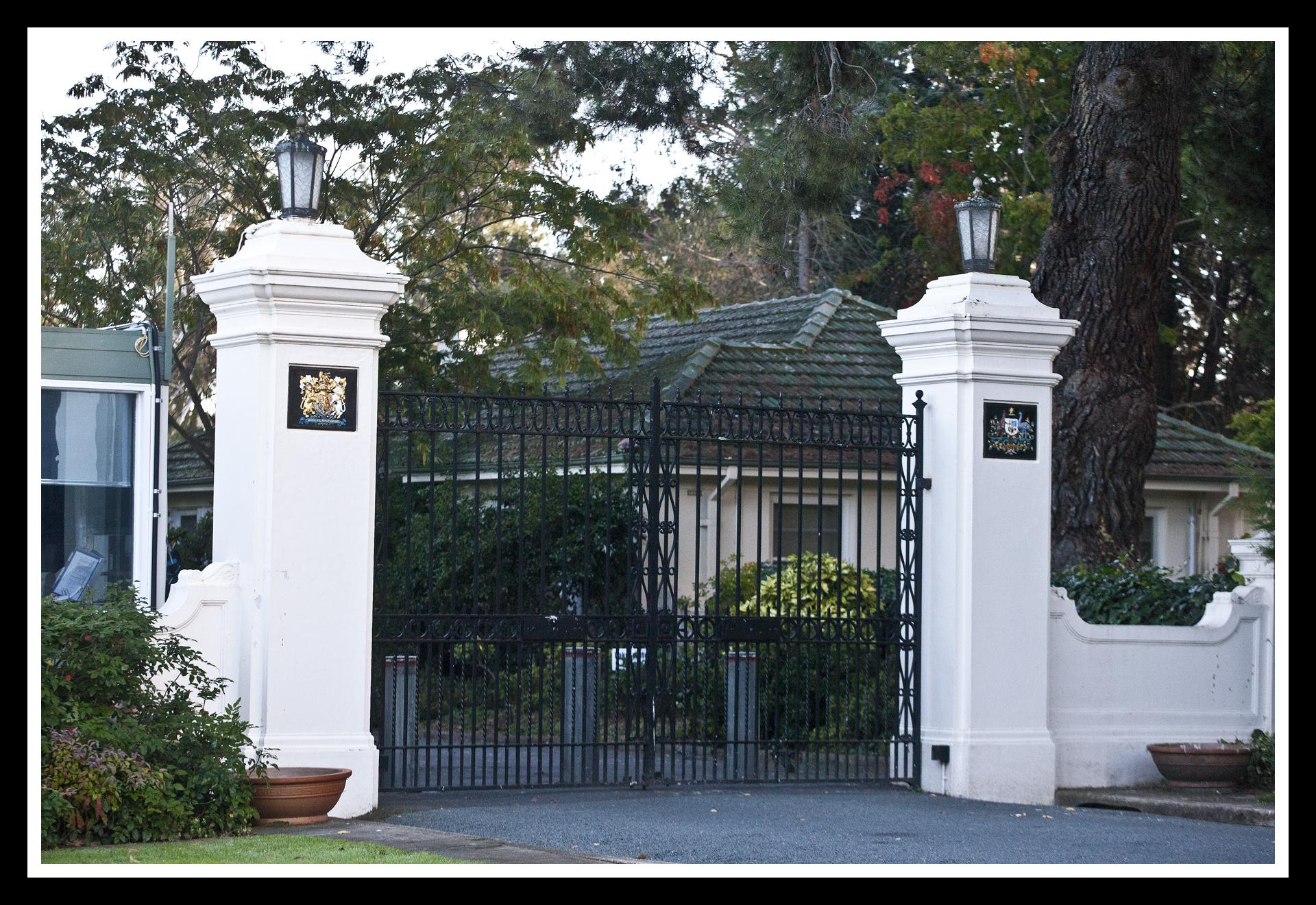
Iron gates decorated with the royal arms and the coat of arms of Australia at the property's entrance

Government House is situated in the south-western part of Canberra, in the suburb of Yarralumla. It is located on the shores of Lake Burley Griffin on a north–south orientation and is reached by Dunrossil Drive — named after the only Australian governor-general to die in office, Lord Dunrossil. At the entrance to the grounds are iron gates, decorated with the Royal and Commonwealth coats of arms, and a gatekeeper's cottage. The curving drive leads to the house through ornamental lawns and gardens.

=== Residence ===
Government House consists of a central brick block, erected by Frederick Campbell in 1890–1891 on the remnants of an 1830s homestead. The house was enlarged in 1899 and again during the 1920s. Further additions were made to it in the 1930s and 1940s. All of these structures were rendered with a layer of cement and painted cream. The roof tiles are green.

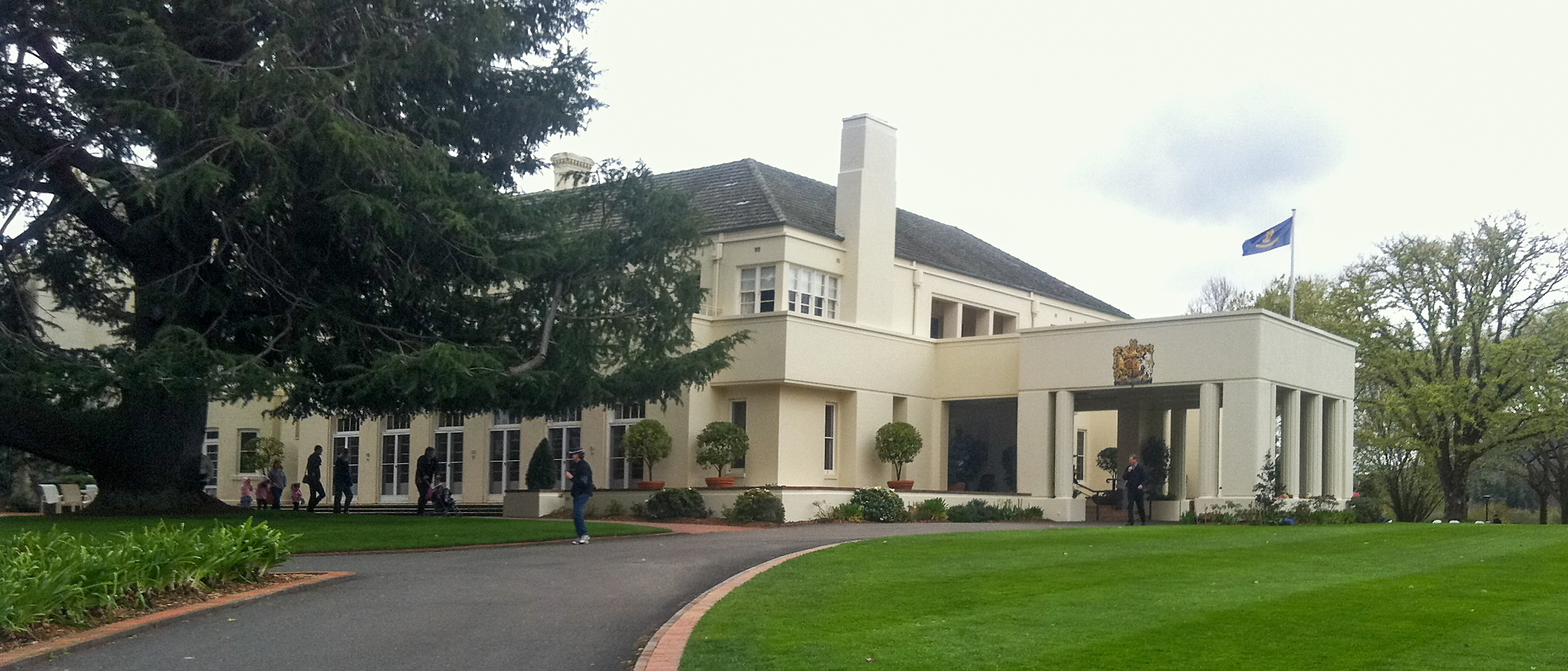
The "State Entrance" and the main doorway to Government House is covered by a porte-cochère

The "State Entrance" to Government House is located on its eastern facade, and is protected by a porte-cochère, within which there is a set of steps leading up to the main entry doors.

Running along the centre of the house is the wood-panelled "State Entrance Hall", lined with Australian artworks and furniture, including a study by multiple Archibald Prize-winner Sir William Dargie for the "Wattle Portrait" of Queen Elizabeth II and a study for a portrait, again by Dargie, of Prince Philip, Duke of Edinburgh.

Official ceremonies, such as the swearing-in of Cabinet ministers, the presentation of honours and the holding of receptions, take place in the drawing room, which is hung with paintings by Australian artists and contains examples of early Australian furniture.

The drawing room leads through to the private entrance, which is composed of a series of rooms leading from the south façade (with views of the Brindabella Ranges) through to the "State Entrance Hall". Again, these rooms are hung with paintings by Australian artists and contain antique furniture and other items of interest.

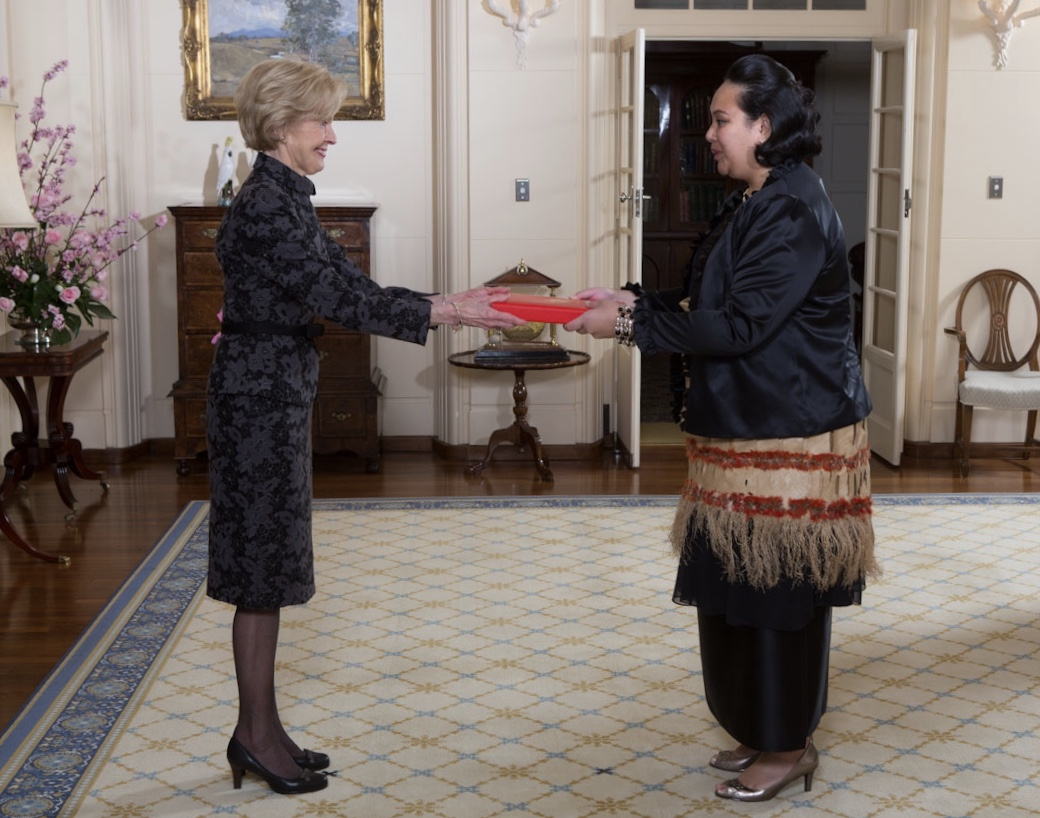
Princess Lātūfuipeka Tukuʻaho, High Commissioner for Tonga, presents credentials to Governor-General Dame Quentin Bryce in the drawing room.

The private entrance is only used by the monarch and the current prime minister. As such, an incoming prime minister enters through the state entrance to receive their commission while they leave through the private entrance. Conversely, where a prime minister comes to Government House to resign after losing an election or the leadership of their party, they enter through the private entrance and exit through the state entrance.

Beyond the private entrance are a morning room and a small dining room. This small dining room features a series of paintings by Australian indigenous artists. These rooms lead back to the "State Entrance Hall".

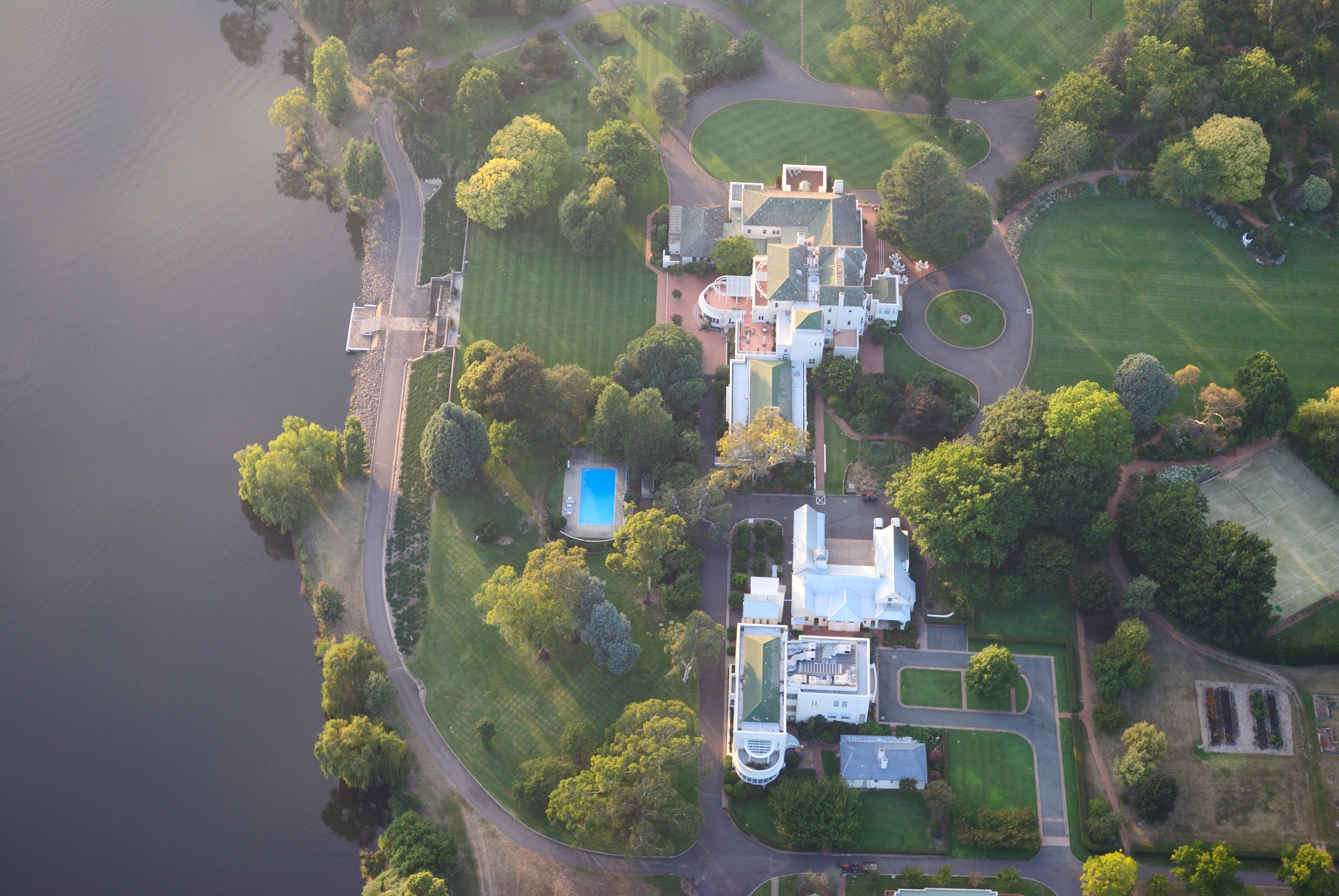
Aerial view of Government House and Lake Burley Griffin adjacent to it

On the lakefront side of the house is the "State Dining Room". It features a large bay window overlooking Lake Burley Griffin, which leads out on to a terrace. Also on the ground floor, and commanding views of the lake, are the governor-general's study, where the vice-regal incumbent works and receives visitors, and a sitting room with an attached vestibule which links with a number of offices and service rooms.

The upper floors of Government House contain the governor-general's private residence and guest rooms.

The furnishings and decoration of Government House represent a wide spectrum of Australian artists and craftspeople, ranging from colonial times to the present day and expressing a rich variety of styles. It also houses a large collection of artworks by Australian indigenous artists. Cultural institutions including the National Gallery of Australia, the National Library of Australia and The Australiana Fund, have lent much of the furniture and art objects gracing the house.

Artists with works displayed in Government House include E. Phillips Fox, Tom Roberts, Sir Arthur Streeton, Sir William Dargie, Margaret Preston, Rupert Bunny, Nicholas Chevalier, William Beckwith McInnes, Elioth Gruner, Sir Lionel Lindsay, Sir Bertram Mackennal, Sir Hans Heysen, Lloyd Rees, Fred Williams, Arthur Boyd, Sir Sidney Nolan, Leonard French, Justin O'Brien, Ray Crooke, John Dowie, Johnny Warangkula Tjupurrula, Margaret Olley, Pro Hart, Yala Yala Gibbs Tjungarrayi, Charlie Tjararu Tjungarrayi and Paddy Japaljarri Sims.

=== Gardens ===
Extensive landscaped grounds surround the house. They were first devised and put in place by the horticulturalist Charles Weston. Many of the trees in the gardens have been planted by visiting dignitaries. The grounds include extensive plantations of trees and sweeping lawns, which provide vistas towards Black Mountain in the north and the Brindabella Ranges in the south.

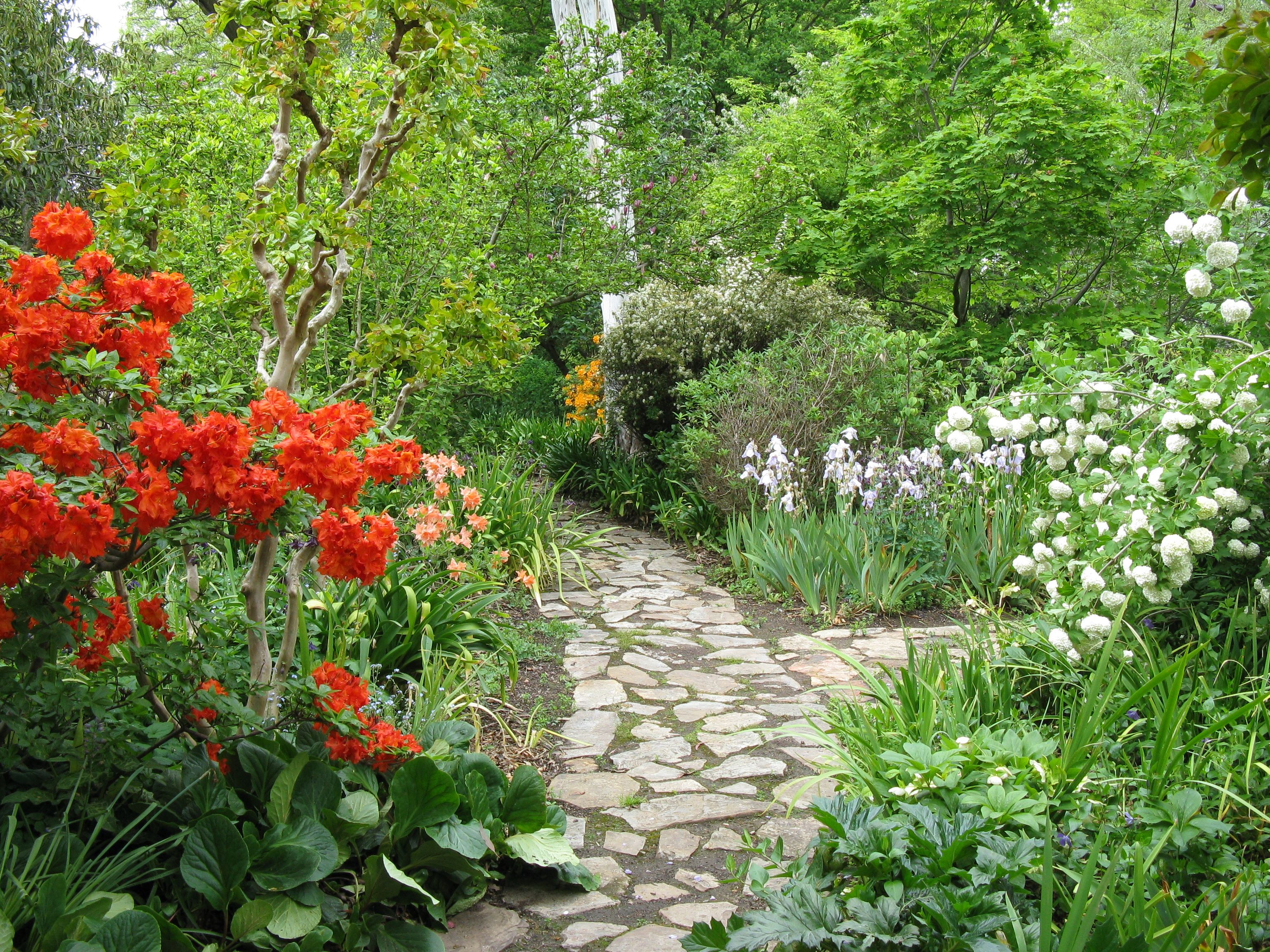
The English Garden on the grounds of Government House, laid out by Lady Gowrie

The "Wild Garden" or "English Garden" was laid out by Lady Gowrie, and includes a memorial to Patrick Hore-Ruthven, the only surviving son of governor-general Lord and Lady Gowrie, who was killed in the Second World War. The design of this garden was influenced by the work of Edna Walling and Paul Sorenson. Other gardens have been laid out by successive governors-general and their spouses. The lakeside lawn and terraces, for instance, were developed at the time Lake Burley Griffin was filled with water in the early 1960s, during the vice-regal tenure of Lord De L'Isle. Further developments to the terraces were undertaken during the term of Sir Ninian Stephen in the 1980s.

A rhododendron grove was designed and planted in the 1970s by Otto Ruzicka, and is called the "Hasluck Garden" after governor-general Sir Paul and his vice-regal consort, Dame Alexandra Hasluck.

In addition, large numbers of bulbs were planted along the eastern side of the "Vista Lawn" to the south of the house in the 1990s at the suggestion of Dallas Hayden, wife of governor-general Bill Hayden. The Bravery Garden was established in the grounds of Government House, suggested by Sir William and Lady Deane and inspired by John Thurgar OAM, MBE and Hedonna Thurgar, founders of the Australian Bravery Association. The garden displays different Australian civilian and military decorations, including the Victoria Cross, and the civilian equivalent, the Cross of Valour, all nestled in plantings of mostly Australian and New Zealand plants. In 2014 a hedge of 'Gallipoli Centenary Rose' was planted.

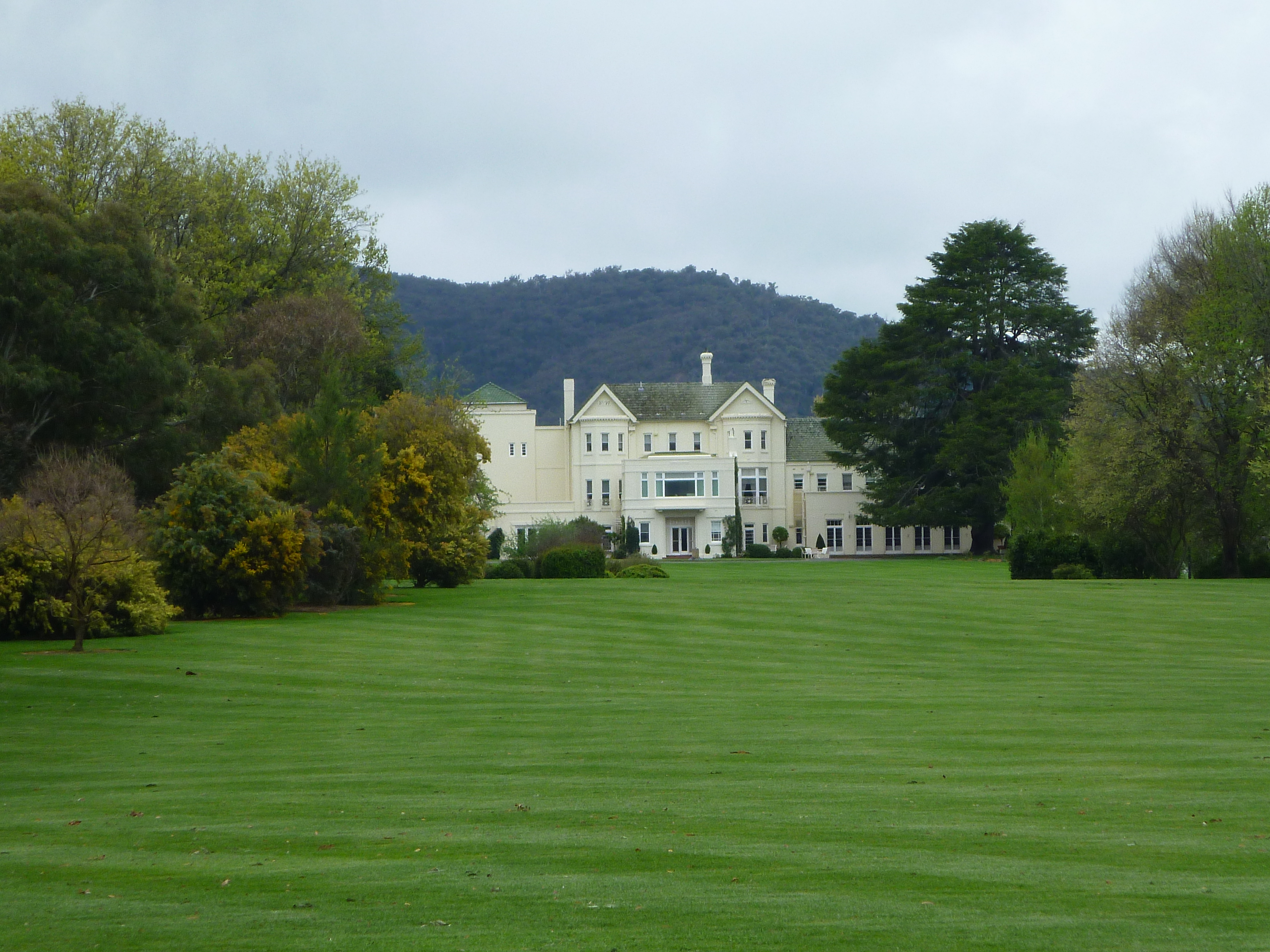
The Vista Lawn is a 450 metres (1,480 ft) lawn that faces the southern entrance of the residence.

About 100 metres (330 ft) south of the house there is a slight depression in Yarralumla's "Vista Lawn". It marks the location of a filled-in brick and cement vault which once contained the bodies of two of the property's colonial-era inhabitants, Elizabeth Gibbes (c. 1790-1874) and her husband, Colonel John George Nathaniel Gibbes (1787-1873). Originally, the subterranean vault was surrounded by a stand of yews and hawthorns. In 1880, the coffins containing the remains of the Colonel and Mrs Gibbes were removed from the vault by their son "Gussie" Gibbes and reinterred at St John the Baptist Church, Reid. In the same churchyard, just a few paces from the Gibbes' burial plot, lies the grave of Lord Dunrossil (1893-1961), Australia's 14th governor-general, who died during his Yarralumla tenure.

== Cultural depictions ==
The heritage-listed elm trees that line Dunrossil Drive inspired the symphonic poem Dunrossil Elms by Australian composer Alexander Voltz, which won the Symphonic Category of the 2024 George Enescu International Competition.

== See also ==
- Government House
- Government Houses of the British Empire and Commonwealth
