= Lennox Gardens =

Urban park in Canberra, Australia

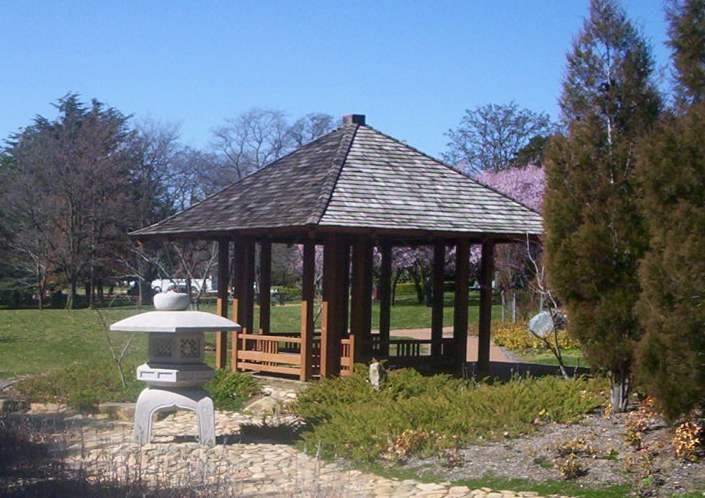
- Canberra-Nara park within Lennox Gardens
- Interactive map of Lennox Gardens
- Location: Yarralumla, Australian Capital Territory
- Coordinates: 35°17′54″S 149°7′19″E
- Website: Official website

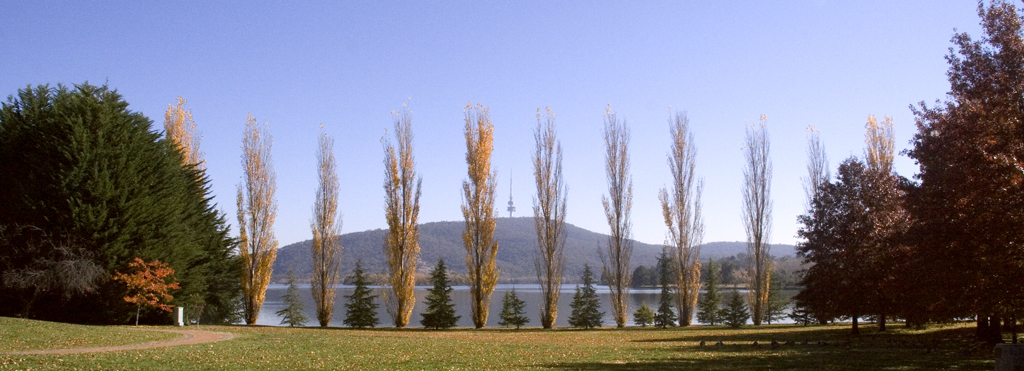
View of Black Mountain

Lennox Gardens, a park in Canberra, Australia, lying on the south side of Lake Burley Griffin, close to Commonwealth Avenue Bridge and Albert Hall in the suburb of Yarralumla. Before the construction of Lake Burley Griffin a road ran through the present garden, this road being one of two main crossing points across the Molonglo River. The name of the road was Lennox Crossing from which the present garden takes its name. The northern segment of the road is still present on Acton peninsula. The garden was officially named in 1963. Lennox Crossing was named after David Lennox, an early bridge builder in NSW and Victoria.

The park in its current condition was established with the filling of Lake Burley Griffin in the 1960s; however the park's history is much older, as it was part of the original Royal Canberra Golf course which is now underneath the lake. The part of the golf course which had not been flooded was named Lennox Gardens.

It has a number of memorials and monuments such as Kasuga stones presented to Canberra by Japan in April 1997, a monument to Australians in the Spanish Civil War, and a stone monument commemorating the centenary of Federation.

Controversially, it also has a monument dedicated to the Jewish National Fund.

It also has a Wisteria pergola sponsored by Totalcare industries in celebration of the Nara sister city relationship.

In 2018 the Canberra Rotary Peace Bell was unveiled in the spirt of Peace in our Cities and homes. This bell is one of 27 in the world with the first World Peace bell unveiled in the forecourt of the United Nations in New York in 1954. The UN Peace Bell was donated by Choyoji Nakagawa, a former Japanese soldier, and that bell and all 27 World Peace bells are struck on the UN International Day of Peace 21 September each year.

Located within the park is the Canberra-Nara Peace Park (not to be confused with Canberra Peace Park), a park which symbolises the friendship between Canberra and the sister city of Nara, Japan.
