= Yarralumla Woolshed, Australian Capital Territory =

Heritage building in Australia

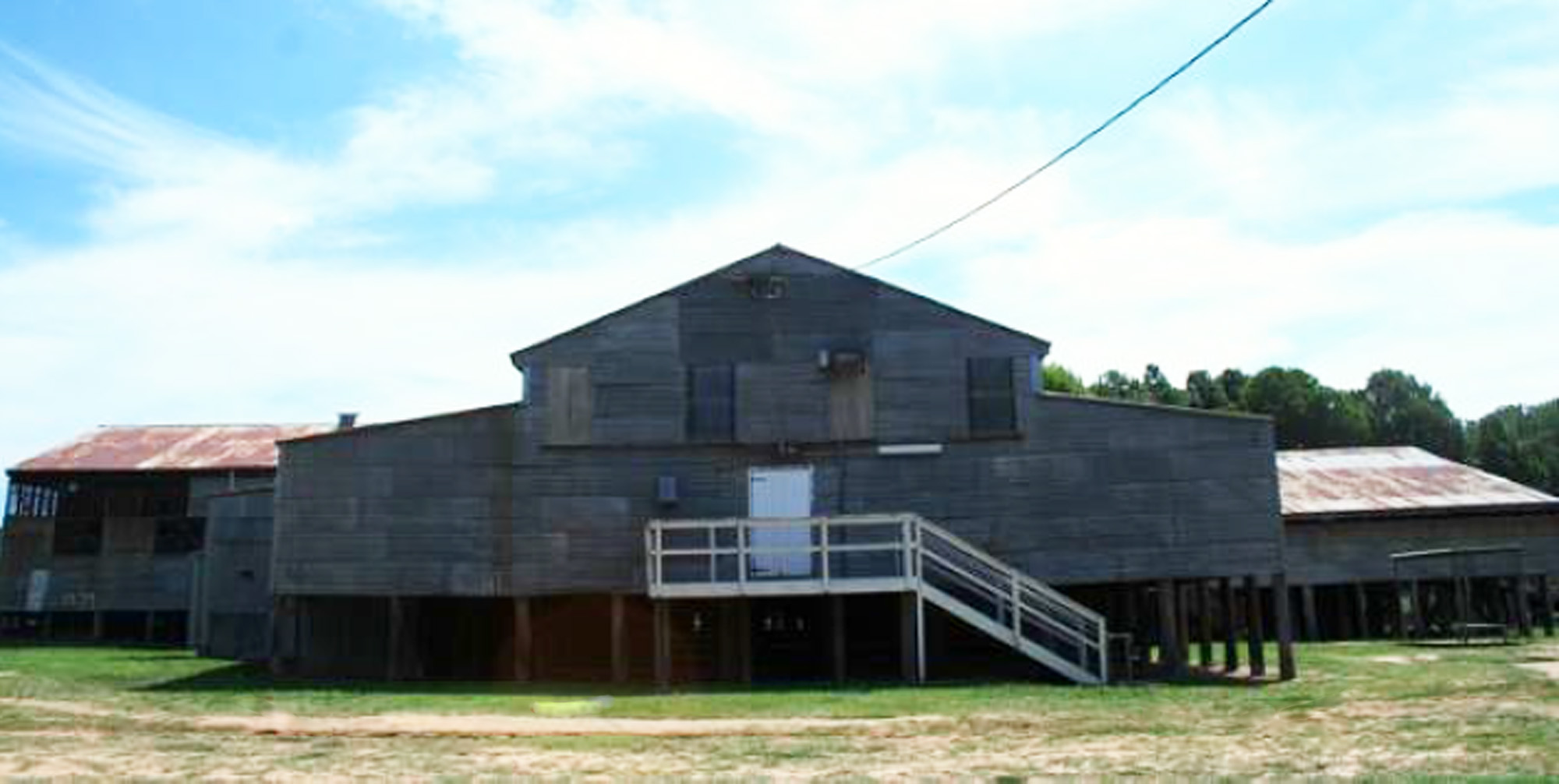
Yarralumla Woolshed

The Yarralumla Woolshed in the Australian Capital Territory is a building of historical significance and is listed on the ACT Heritage Register. It is a symbol of Canberra's growth from pastoral town to major city. The shed was built in 1904 by Frederick Campbell who at that time owned Yarralumla Homestead which is now Government House. Today the woolshed is owned by the ACT Government and is an important community social centre and a venue for folk concerts, bush dances and is available for weddings.

== Early history ==
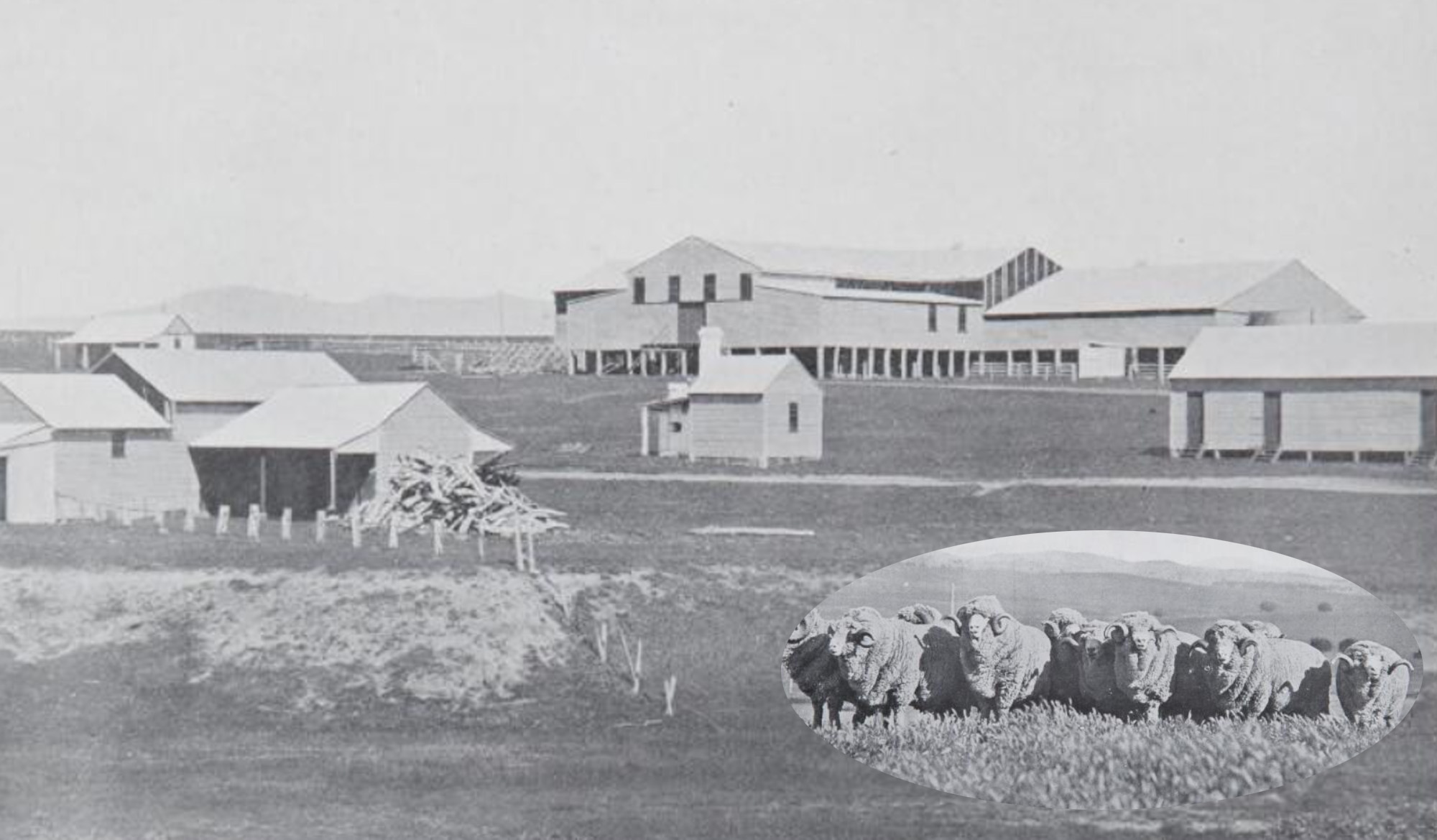
Yarralumla Woolshed in 1910. The inset shows the marino sheep at Yarralumla at this time.

Frederick Campbell (1846 – 1928) who built Yarralumla Woolshed came from a wealthy pastoral family. His grandfather was Robert Campbell who owned Duntroon and several other large properties. He bought the Yarralumla Estate in 1881 and made major improvements and additions to the area. In 1898 a reporter from the Australasian Pastoralist's review visited Yarralumla and said that Mr Campbell had 32,000 merinos and 2000 crossbred sheep.

His merino sheep were regarded as one of the best in New South Wales. A photo of them as an inset is shown on the right. There was a woolshed on the property before the current building but it was not adequate for Frederick Campbell's needs. So in 1904 he asked the builder Frederick Young who had previously built Yarralumla Homestead to construct the woolshed. A feature article was written about the Yarralumla Estate in 1910 which describes the building. It said.

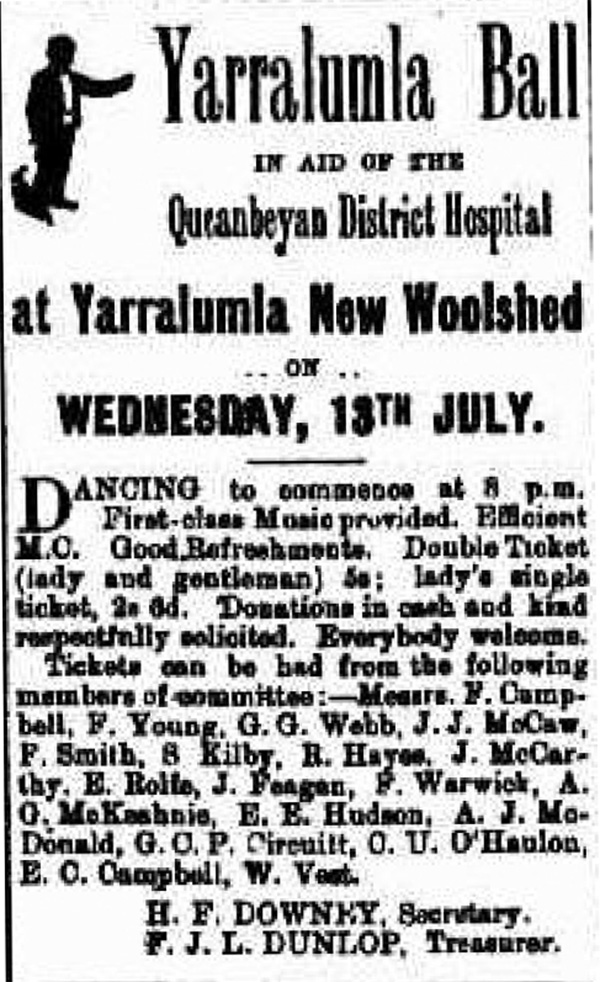
Advertisement for the Ball at Yarralumla Woolshed in 1904

"The shearing shed is one of the most recent improvements. It was built in 1904 and has accommodation sufficient to shelter 5000 sheep at shearing time. The building is designed on most modern principles so that time and labour are saved during the busiest time of the year. The wide openings facilitate working the sheep and enable the shed to be filled in the shortest space of time. There are twenty stands of Wolseley shearing machines and close to the shed is a well-constructed sheep dip."

The photo of the woolshed that accompanied this feature article is shown. Soon after its construction the building was used for community activities. In July 1904 a ball was held to raise funds for the hospital. The event was described in the newspapers.

"Scarcely a neighbourhood was not represented; having all travelled distances requiring the use of horses and vehicles, the conveyances lined up around the shed presented a pleasing and most busy aspect. Inside the building every comfort had been thoughtfully arranged. Between the spacious walls of one of the most up-to-date and commodious woolsheds in the southern districts, and to the strains of music, violin, piano, and cornet - which blended like a miniature orchestra, the large gathering passed the night in convivial merriment.

The woolshed, which is not yet completed, is in the hands of Mr. Fred Young, a Queanbeyan contractor, and reflects very great credit upon Mr. Fred. Campbell, its architect, and in years to come-as it has been built to, stay - the stable workmanship of the contractor will bear good evidence that he was a man of trade. The music was supplied by Miss M. Noonan (Cooma), piano; Mr. Loughnan, violin; and Mr. James Elliott (Cooma), cornet. A large improvised dining room was arranged in one end of the shed, where midnight supper was partaken."

In 1913 the Commonwealth Government acquired the whole Yarralumla Estate and the Campbell family moved to Tumut.

== Later history ==
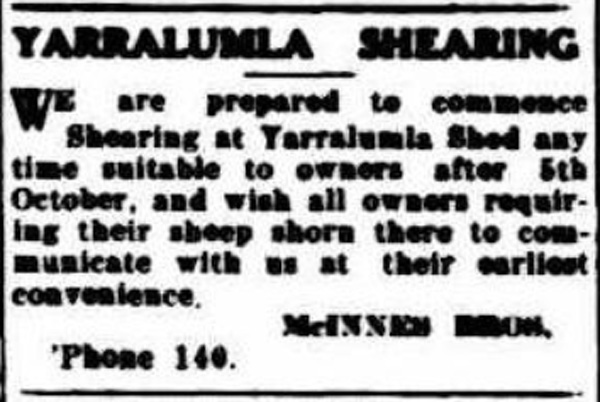
Advertisement for shearing services at the Yarralumla Woolshed by the McInnes Brothers in 1925

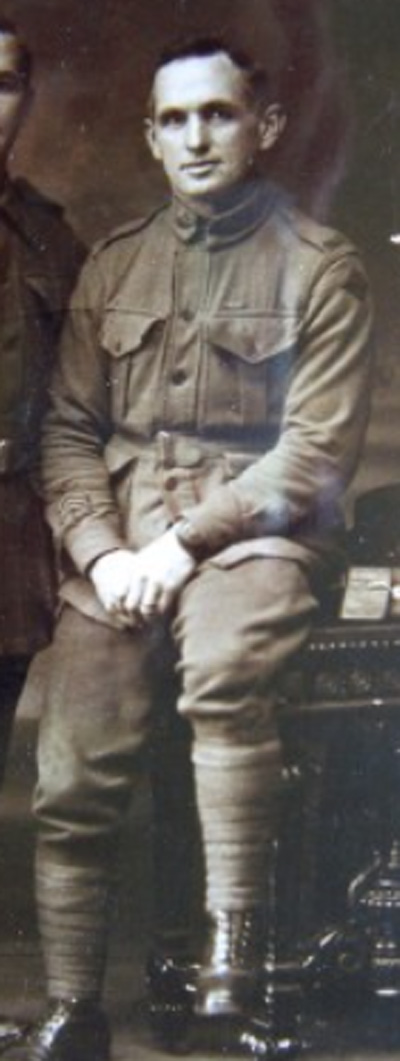
George McInnes of McInnes Brothers who was also a shearer

After the Government bought the property in 1913 the woolshed continued to be used for shearing sheep. At first the Government advertised it to sheep owners as being available "at a minimum charge" but later it was leased to various companies. In 1927 the then Governor-General Lord Stonehaven who was resident in the Yarralumla Homestead which had been converted to Government House argued that the Woolshed should be retained because of its link with the wool industry.

The company which had the longest association with Yarralumla Woolshed was the McInnes Brothers. One of the brothers, Andrew, was a shearer at the shed in its early days. Another was George Lochart Nairn McInnes who was also a shearer and who owned the property “Riverview” in Tuggeranong which later became the suburb of Gordon. His photo is shown.

The McInnes Brothers commenced leasing the building from 1920. The terms of their leasing contract are shown at this reference. They owned a property called “Kowen” near Queanbeyan and had numerous other business interests in the district including the operation of a butchery in Queanbeyan. They were the sons of John McInnes (1840-1901) whose father was a pioneer of the district.

The McInnes Brothers started their shearing contractor business in 1904. They hired teams of shearers and supplied them with the necessary equipment. They then either sent the teams to individual properties in the district to shear the sheep or they kept them at the Yarralumla Woolshed and the farmers brought their sheep here to be sheared. An advertisement for this latter activity is shown. The Mcinnes family continued their association with the shed until the 1960s. An article in the Canberra Times of 1967 featured the shearing contractor Les McInnes, the son of Andrew McInnes, at the Yarralumla Woolshed.

After 1967 shearing ceased at the Woolshed and since the 1970s the building has become an important Canberra community social venue.
