= Charles Weston (horticulturalist) =

Australian horticulturist

Charles Weston MBE
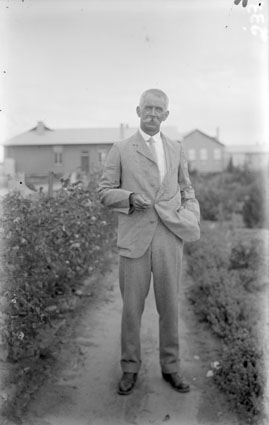
- Weston at Yarralumla nursery, 1921
- Born: Thomas Charles George Weston; 14 October 1866; Middlesex, England
- Died: 1 December 1935 (aged 69); Turramurra, New South Wales, Australia
- Occupation: Horticulturist

Charles Weston MBE, born Thomas Charles George Weston (14 October 1866 – 1 December 1935) was an Australian horticulturist and was responsible for the afforestation of Canberra.

Weston was born in Middlesex, England. He trained as a horticulturist in the United Kingdom and moved to New South Wales in 1896. He was employed as a gardener at Admiralty House in Sydney from 1898 to 1908 and as the superintendent at Federal Government House, Sydney until 1912. He managed the State Nursery, at Campbelltown between 1912 and 1913, and was appointed officer-in-charge of afforestation, Canberra in that year. He held that position until 1926.

To increase Canberra's biodiversity, scientific breeding trials were orchestrated by Weston in collaboration with the city's designer Walter Burley Griffin. He also established the first plantation forest on Mount Stromlo. Nearly 1.2 million trees were put in between 1921 and 1924. Weston Park, a large park in Canberra, is named in his honour, as is a eucalypt, and a creek, street, and district of the Capital. In 2015 it was announced that the name of a new primary school in the Molonglo Valley district of the Australian Capital Territory would also commemorate his name. He died in Turramurra and his ashes were scattered in front of Old Parliament House in Canberra.
