= Egyptian Room =

Egyptian Room may refer to:

- Egyptian Club (also known as Egyptian Room), a lesbian bar in Portland, Oregon
- Egyptian Room (Indianapolis), an event space at the Old National Centre in Indianapolis
- Egyptian Room, Royal Arch Masonic Temple, Sydney, Australia
