= Commonwealth Parliament (disambiguation) =

Commonwealth Parliament may refer to

- Parliament of Australia, the federal parliament of the Commonwealth of Australia, as opposed to the parliaments of the Australian states
- Commonwealth Parliament (England), during the Commonwealth of the 1650s
- Sejm of the Polish–Lithuanian Commonwealth

== See also ==
- Commonwealth
- Parliament
- Commonwealth Youth Parliament of the Commonwealth of Nations
- Commonwealth Heads of Government Meeting of the Commonwealth of Nations
- CIS Interparliamentary Assembly of the Commonwealth of Independent States
- Commonwealth of Catalonia 1914–1925 deliberative assembly
- Parliament of the United Kingdom, often called the "Imperial Parliament" of the British Empire, predecessor of the Commonwealth of Nations
