= Michael Poole (politician) =

British Falkland Islands politician (born 1984)

The Honourable Michael Poole
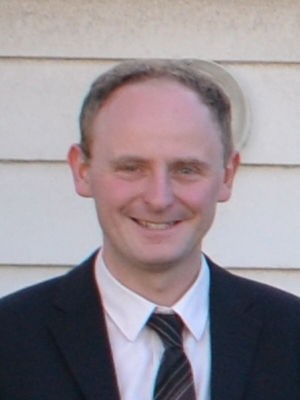

Member of the Falkland Islands Legislative Assembly for Stanley
- In office 7 November 2013 – 9 November 2017
- Preceded by: Dick Sawle
- Succeeded by: Roger Spink

Personal details
- Born: 4 October 1984 (age 41)
- Party: Nonpartisan

Michael Poole (born 4 October 1984) is a British, Falkland Islands politician who served as a Member of the Legislative Assembly for the Stanley constituency from 2013 to 2017. Poole was the first member of the Legislative Assembly to have been born after the Falklands War.

Prior to his election Poole was a Senior Economist and Statistical Analyst in the Policy Unit of the Falkland Islands Government. He had previously worked as a manager in the King Edward VII Memorial Hospital in Stanley and was a representative of a fishing industry association. In 2012 Poole travelled with a group of young islanders to promote the Falkland Islanders' right to self-determination at a meeting of the Special Committee on Decolonization in New York City and later at the Commonwealth Youth Parliament in London.

Poole stepped down from the Legislative Assembly at the 2017 general election. In August 2018 it was announced he had been appointed Development Manager at the Falklands Development Corporation.
