= Prossy =

Prossy is a given name. Notable people with the name include:

- Prossy Akampurira (born 1987), Ugandan politician
- Prossy Tusabe, Ugandan swimmer
- Prossy, a nickname for Priscilla Hiss

== See also ==
- Prossy, a character in the play Candida
