= Commonwealth Parliamentary Association =

Organization to support good governance

- Logo
- Headquarters: London

Leaders
  - Patron: Charles III
  - Chair: Catherine Fife
  - Secretary-General: Stephen Twigg

Establishment
  - Empire Parliamentary Association: 1911
  - Commonwealth Parliamentary Association: 1948

The Commonwealth Parliamentary Association (CPA), previously known as the Empire Parliamentary Association, is an organisation which works to support good governance, democracy and human rights.

In 2024, King Charles III, Head of the Commonwealth became the patron of the CPA in succession to Queen Elizabeth II. The vice-patronship rotates amongst the Heads of State and Heads of Government of the Commonwealth nations who host its forthcoming annual Commonwealth Parliamentary Conference. The Association's supreme authority is the General Assembly, constituted by delegates to the annual Commonwealth Parliamentary Conference. The business and activities of the CPA are managed by an Executive Committee, which reports to the General Assembly. The CPA's funds are derived from membership fees paid by its branches, as well as from two trust funds and benefactors.

The official publication of the Commonwealth Parliamentary Association is The Parliamentarian, the Journal of Commonwealth Parliaments which was first published in January 1920. The organisation administers the Commonwealth Women Parliamentarians (CWP), a network across the Commonwealth which promotes greater representation for women in Parliament; the CPA Small Branches network, representing Parliaments and Legislatures with populations below 1 million people; the Commonwealth Parliamentarians with Disabilities (CPwD) network; and the Commonwealth Youth Parliament, an annual gathering of young people hosted by a Commonwealth Parliament.

The Commonwealth Parliamentary Association (CPA) currently has almost 180 branches and is divided into nine regions: Africa, Asia, Australia, British Islands and Mediterranean, Canada, Caribbean, Americas and Atlantic, India, Pacific, and South-East Asia. The CPA Headquarters Secretariat is based in London.

== History ==
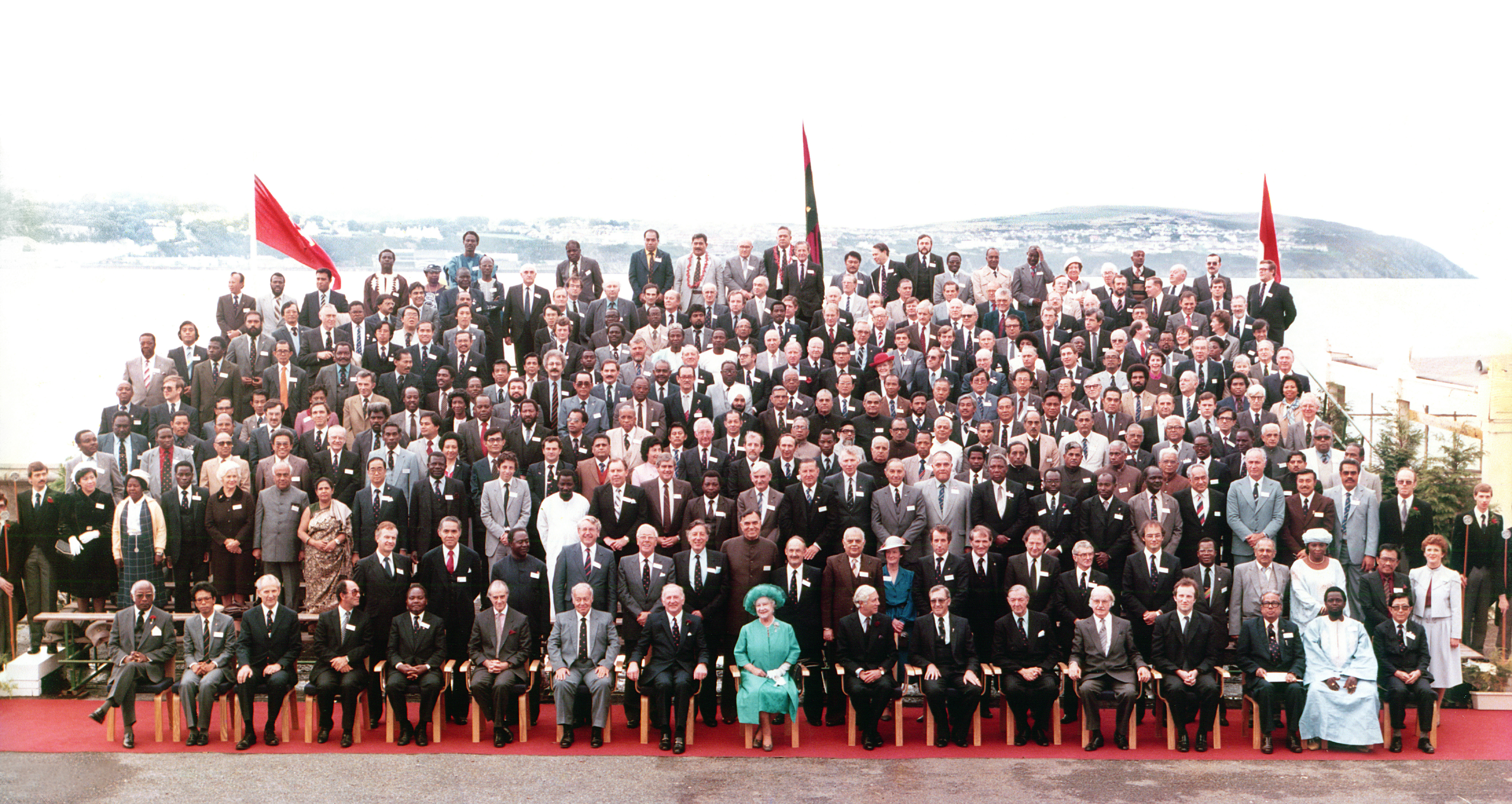
CPA conference, Isle of Man, October 1984

The CPA was founded as the Empire Parliamentary Association in 1911, with its first branches being Australia, Canada, Newfoundland, New Zealand, South Africa and the United Kingdom, the latter branch administering the Association as a whole. In 1948 the Association changed its name to the current Commonwealth Parliamentary Association, and invited all branches to participate in the organisation's administration.

In 1989, Queen Elizabeth II became the patron of the Commonwealth Parliamentary Association, although she had been involved with the Association since her Coronation in 1953. In 2024, King Charles III, Head of the Commonwealth became the patron of the CPA.

== Officers ==
The office of Chairperson of the CPA Executive Committee is held by Hon. Christopher Kalilia, MP of the National Assembly of Zambia since November 2024.

Previous CPA Chairpersons have included: Ian Liddell-Grainger of the Parliament of the United Kingdom (2021-2024), Emilia Monjowa Lifaka, Deputy Speaker of the National Assembly of Cameroon (2017-2021); Shirin Sharmin Chaudhury, Speaker of Bangladesh Parliament of (2014–2017), who succeeded Alan Haselhurst (2011–2014), formerly Chairman of Ways and Means of the UK Parliament.

The position of CPA Vice-Chairperson is currently held by Hon. Carmel Sepuloni, MP, Deputy Leader of the Opposition and Member of the New Zealand Parliament.

Since October 2025, the CPA Treasurer is Senator Hon. Sue Lines, President of the Australian Senate.

Since October 2025, the Chairperson of the Commonwealth Women Parliamentarians is Catherine Fife, MPP from the Legislative Assembly of Ontario, Canada. Previous CWP Chairpersons include: Zainab Gimba, MP from the House of Representatives (Nigeria); Shandana Gulzar Khan, MNA from the National Assembly of Pakistan; Noraini Ahmad, MP from the Parliament of Malaysia; Rebecca Kadaga, MP from the Parliament of Uganda; Alix Boyd Knights, House of Assembly of Dominica; Kashmala Tariq, National Assembly of Pakistan; Lindiwe Maseko, Parliament of South Africa and Gauteng Provincial Legislature.

Since November 2024, the Chairperson for the CPA Small Branches is Hon. Valerie Woods, Speaker of the House of Representatives of Belize. Previous CPA Small Branches Chairpersons include: Joy Burch, previously MLA and Speaker of the Australian Capital Territory Legislative Assembly, Niki Rattle, former Speaker of the Parliament of the Cook Islands and Angelo Farrugia, Speaker of the Parliament of Malta.

Since October 2025, the Chairperson of the Commonwealth Parliamentarians with Disabilities (CPwD) is Senator Hon. Isaiah Jacob, a Member of the Malaysia Senate Dewan Negara. Previous CPwD Chairpersons include Laura Kanushu, MP from the Parliament of Uganda, Dennitah Ghati, HSC from the National Assembly (Kenya), and Kevin Murphy (Canadian politician), former Speaker of the House of Assembly of Nova Scotia.

== Secretaries-General ==
The CPA's 8th Secretary-General is Stephen Twigg. He was appointed in August 2020 for a four-year term and this was renewed in 2024 for another four years. Twigg was elected to the Parliament of the United Kingdom as a Member of Parliament from 1997 to 2005 (Enfield Southgate) and from 2010 to 2019 (Liverpool West Derby). During his parliamentary career, he held several senior positions including chairing the International Development Select Committee, Minister for Schools and a range of Shadow Front Bench roles.

Previous Secretaries-General have been: Karimulla Akbar Khan, UK/Guyanese Lawyer (2016-2019); William F. Shija, former Minister Tanzania Parliament (2007–2014); Denis Marshall, former Minister New Zealand Parliament (2002–2006); Arthur Donahoe, former Speaker Nova Scotia House of Assembly (1993–2001); David Tonkin, former Premier South Australia (1986–1992); Sir Robin Vandervelt from South Africa (1961–1985); Sir Howard d’Egville (1949–1960).

== Members ==
Members of the CPA are listed below. Both national and subnational parliaments are included.

Members	National and Sub-National Parliaments
Alderney	States of Alderney
Anguilla	Parliament of Anguilla
Antigua and Barbuda	Parliament of Antigua and Barbuda; Barbuda Council
Australia	Parliament of Australia.; Australian Capital Territory Legislative Assembly; Parliament of New South Wales; Northern Territory Legislative Assembly; Parliament of Queensland; Parliament of South Australia; Parliament of Tasmania; Parliament of Victoria; Parliament of Western Australia
The Bahamas	Parliament of the Bahamas
Bangladesh	Parliament of Bangladesh
Barbados	Parliament of Barbados
Belize	Parliament of Belize
Bermuda	Parliament of Bermuda
Botswana	Parliament of Botswana
British Virgin Islands	House of Assembly of the British Virgin Islands
Cameroon	National Assembly of Cameroon
Canada	Parliament of Canada; Legislative Assembly of Alberta; Legislative Assembly of British Columbia; Legislative Assembly of Manitoba; Legislative Assembly of New Brunswick; Newfoundland and Labrador House of Assembly; Legislative Assembly of the Northwest Territories; Nova Scotia House of Assembly; Legislative Assembly of Nunavut; Legislative Assembly of Ontario; Legislative Assembly of Prince Edward Island; National Assembly of Quebec; Legislative Assembly of Saskatchewan; Yukon Legislative Assembly
Cayman Islands	Parliament of the Cayman Islands
Cook Islands	Parliament of the Cook Islands
Cyprus	House of Representatives of Cyprus
Dominica	House of Assembly of Dominica
Eswatini	Parliament of Eswatini
Falkland Islands	Legislative Assembly of the Falkland Islands
Fiji	Parliament of Fiji
Gambia	National Assembly of the Gambia
Ghana	Parliament of Ghana
Gibraltar	Gibraltar Parliament
Grenada	Parliament of Grenada
Guernsey	States of Guernsey
Guyana	National Assembly of Guyana
India	Parliament of India; Andhra Pradesh Legislature; Arunachal Pradesh Legislative Assembly; Assam Legislative Assembly; Bihar Legislature; Chhattisgarh Legislative Assembly; Delhi Legislative Assembly; Goa Legislative Assembly; Gujarat Legislative Assembly; Haryana Legislative Assembly; Himachal Pradesh Legislative Assembly; Jammu and Kashmir Legislative Assembly; Jharkhand Legislative Assembly; Karnataka Legislature; Kerala Legislative Assembly; Madhya Pradesh Legislative Assembly; Maharashtra Legislature; Manipur Legislative Assembly; Meghalaya Legislative Assembly; Mizoram Legislative Assembly; Nagaland Legislative Assembly; Odisha Legislative Assembly; Puducherry Legislative Assembly; Punjab Legislative Assembly; Rajasthan Legislative Assembly; Sikkim Legislative Assembly; Tamil Nadu Legislative Assembly; Telangana Legislature; Tripura Legislative Assembly; Uttarakhand Legislative Assembly; Uttar Pradesh Legislature; West Bengal Legislative Assembly
Isle of Man	High Court of Tynwald
Jamaica	Parliament of Jamaica
Jersey	States of Jersey
Kenya	Parliament of Kenya
Kiribati	House of Assembly
Lesotho	Parliament of Lesotho
Malawi	Parliament of Malawi
Malaysia	Parliament of Malaysia; Johor State Legislative Assembly; Kedah State Legislative Assembly; Kelantan State Legislative Assembly; Malacca State Legislative Assembly; Negeri Sembilan State Legislative Assembly; Pahang State Legislative Assembly; Penang State Legislative Assembly; Perak State Legislative Assembly; Perlis State Legislative Assembly; Sabah State Legislative Assembly; Sarawak State Legislative Assembly; Selangor State Legislative Assembly; Terengganu State Legislative Assembly
Maldives	People's Majlis
Malta	Parliament of Malta
Mauritius	Parliament of Mauritius
Montserrat	Legislative Assembly of Montserrat
Mozambique	Parliament of Mozambique
Namibia	Parliament of Namibia
Nauru	Parliament of Nauru
New Zealand	Parliament of New Zealand
Nigeria	Parliament of Nigeria; Abia State; Adamawa State; Akwa Ibom State; Anambra State; Bauchi State; Bayelsa State; Benue State; Borno State; Cross River State; Delta State; Ebonyi State; Edo State; Ekiti State; Enugu State; Gombe State; Imo State; Jigawa State; Kaduna State; Kano State; Katsina State; Kebbi State; Kogi State; Kwara State; Lagos State; Nasarawa State; Niger State; Ogun State; Ondo State; Osun State; Oyo State; Plateau State; Rivers State; Sokoto State; Taraba State; Yobe State; Zamfara State
Niue	Niue Assembly
Pakistan	Parliament of Pakistan: Provincial Assembly of Balochistan; Provincial Assembly of Khyber Pakhtunkhwa; Provincial Assembly of the Punjab; Provincial Assembly of Sindh
Papua New Guinea	Parliament of Papua New Guinea; Bougainville House of Representatives
Rwanda	Parliament of Rwanda
Saint Helena	Legislative Council of Saint Helena
Saint Kitts and Nevis. Also known as Saint Christopher and Nevis.	National Assembly; Nevis Island Assembly
Saint Lucia	Parliament of Saint Lucia
Saint Vincent and the Grenadines	House of Assembly of Saint Vincent and the Grenadines
Samoa	Legislative Assembly of Samoa
Sark	Sark#Chief Pleas
Seychelles	Parliament of Seychelles
Sierra Leone	Parliament of Sierra Leone
Singapore	Parliament of Singapore
Solomon Islands	National Parliament of the Solomon Islands
South Africa	Parliament of South Africa; Eastern Cape Provincial Legislature; Free State Provincial Legislature; Gauteng Provincial Legislature; KwaZulu-Natal Provincial Legislature; Limpopo Provincial Legislature; Mpumalanga Provincial Legislature; Northern Cape Provincial Legislature; North West Provincial Legislature; Western Cape Provincial Parliament
Sri Lanka	Parliament of Sri Lanka
Tanzania	Parliament of Tanzania; Zanzibar House of Representatives
Tonga	Legislative Assembly of Tonga
Trinidad and Tobago	Parliament of Trinidad and Tobago; Tobago House of Assembly
Turks and Caicos Islands	Turks and Caicos Islands House of Assembly
Tuvalu	Parliament of Tuvalu
Uganda	Parliament of Uganda
United Kingdom	Parliament of the United Kingdom; Scottish Parliament; Senedd Cymru (Welsh Parliament); Northern Ireland Assembly
Vanuatu	Parliament of Vanuatu
Zambia	Parliament of Zambia

== Additional links ==
- The CPA Secretariat Headquarters CPA HQ – you will also find links to The Parliamentarian, the Journal of Commonwealth Parliaments, published by the CPA. Link to The Parliamentarian
- The Africa Region of the CPA CPA Africa
- The British Islands and Mediterranean Region and UK Branch of the CPA is based in Westminster CPA UK
- The Canadian Region of the CPA CPA Canada
- The Australia Region of the CPA CPA Australia
- The Caribbean, Americas and Atlantic Region of the CPA CPA CAA
- American Institute of Parliamentarians – similar association for United States.
