= King George V Memorial =

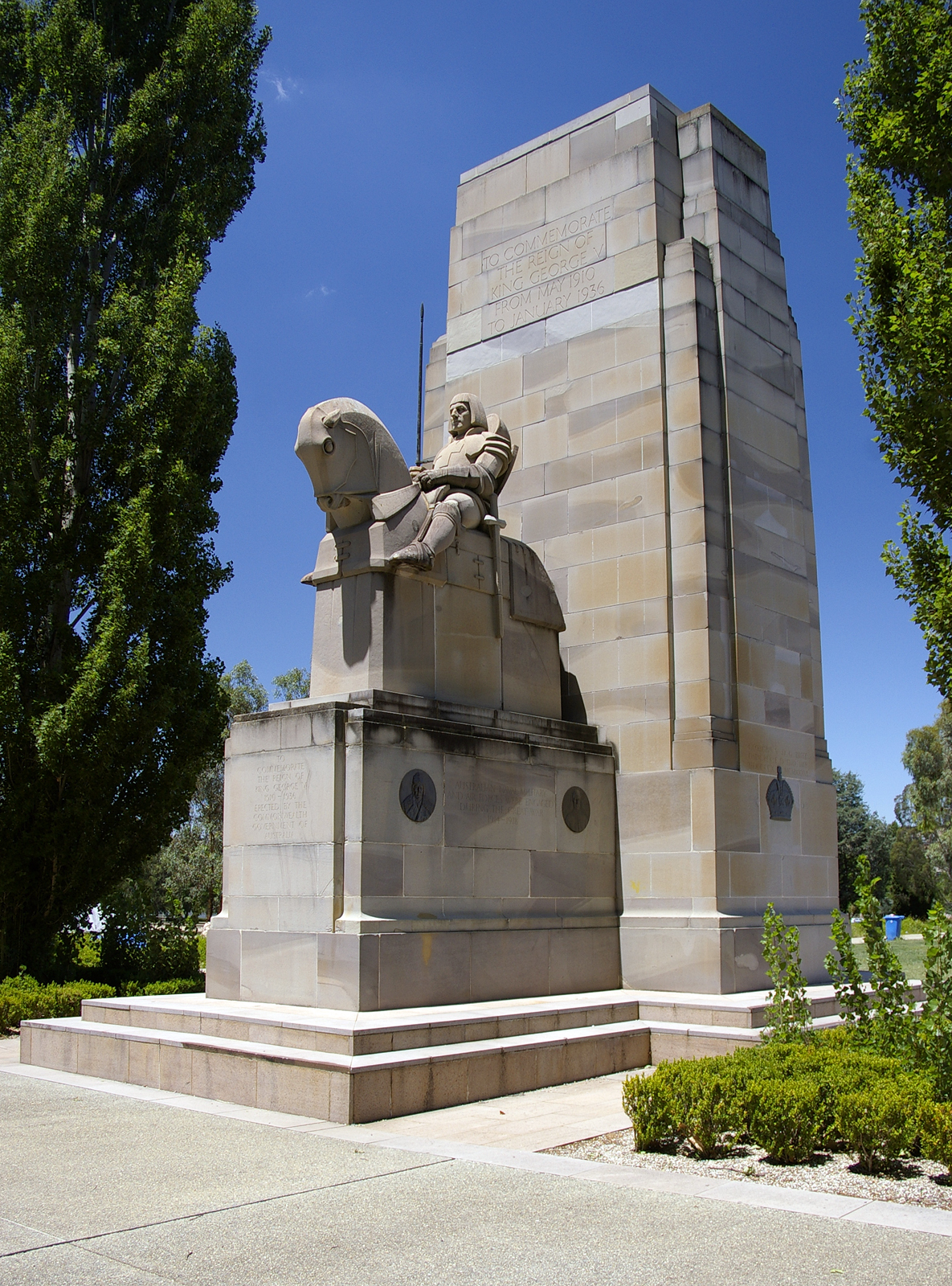
The western face of the King George V Memorial, showing the statue depicting Saint George

The King George V Memorial has been located outside Old Parliament House, Canberra since the 1940s. Commissioned in 1936 and largely completed by 1941, it took until 1953 to officially unveil the monument due to delays to the final elements of its construction which resulted from the Second World War. The Memorial was originally located directly in front of the-then Parliament House, but was moved to its current location in 1968.

== History ==
The memorial was commissioned by the Australian Government in 1936 to commemorate King George V, who had been Australia's head of state from 1910 until his death that year. The Government sought submissions for the design of the monument, and a proposal submitted by sculptor Rayner Hoff and architect Harry Foskett was selected. However, Hoff died in 1937 before work began on the memorial, and John E Moorfield was selected to complete the memorial using Hoff's design.

The memorial includes a bronze statue of King George V on one of its faces. A stone statue of Saint George mounted on a horse is also located on the rear face, and commemorates George V's leadership of the British Empire during the First World War. The Museum of Australian Democracy's website states that:

The King George V memorial is not just a memorial to the King. It is also a war memorial, commissioned before the Australian War Memorial was completed. The monument has two distinct sides – the King George side, which honours both the reign of the monarch and the Australian federation, and the Saint George side, honouring Australia’s contribution to the First World War.

Completion of the memorial was delayed by the Second World War. While it was largely complete by 1941, the casting of the statue of George V and bronze plaques to be mounted on the Memorial did not proceed as the models could not be shipped to the United Kingdom where they were to be cast. These elements of the memorial finally arrived in Australia in 1952. The King George V Memorial was officially unveiled on 4 March 1953.

The memorial was originally located directly opposite Parliament House, with the statue of George V facing the Parliament and that of Saint George facing the Australian War Memorial. This location had been selected by the Government against the views of Hoff and Foskett, who preferred a site away from the direct axis between the Parliament and the War Memorial. In 1968 the memorial was moved to its current location just off the axis so that the view of the Australian War Memorial from the parliament was no longer obstructed. The Minister of the Interior Doug Anthony, gained Prime Minister Robert Menzies' agreement to begin work on the project after convincing him that the memorial was "not ... good statuary" and spoiled the view from parliament. Menzies successor as Prime Minister, Harold Holt, publicly spoke in support of moving the memorial in 1967, describing it as an "excrescence" and joking that he hoped it would be destroyed "if we are so unfortunate as to have an enemy attack". At the time the memorial was moved it was a popular tourist attraction. It was also often used as a meeting point by Canberrans.

The King George V Memorial has been heritage listed since 2004. During 2015 it was restored at a cost of $326,000; these works included installing features to prevent it from being used by skateboarders. At this time, the Canberra Times reported that the memorial was a "revered site for the city's skaters and has even featured in promo videos for international pro skate teams as they toured Australia".

Some Indigenous Australian residents of Canberra called for the memorial to be removed in 2020 on the grounds that it is "inappropriate" to have a British Empire-era monument adjacent to the Aboriginal Tent Embassy.
