= Rayner Hoff =

Australian-British sculptor (1894–1937)

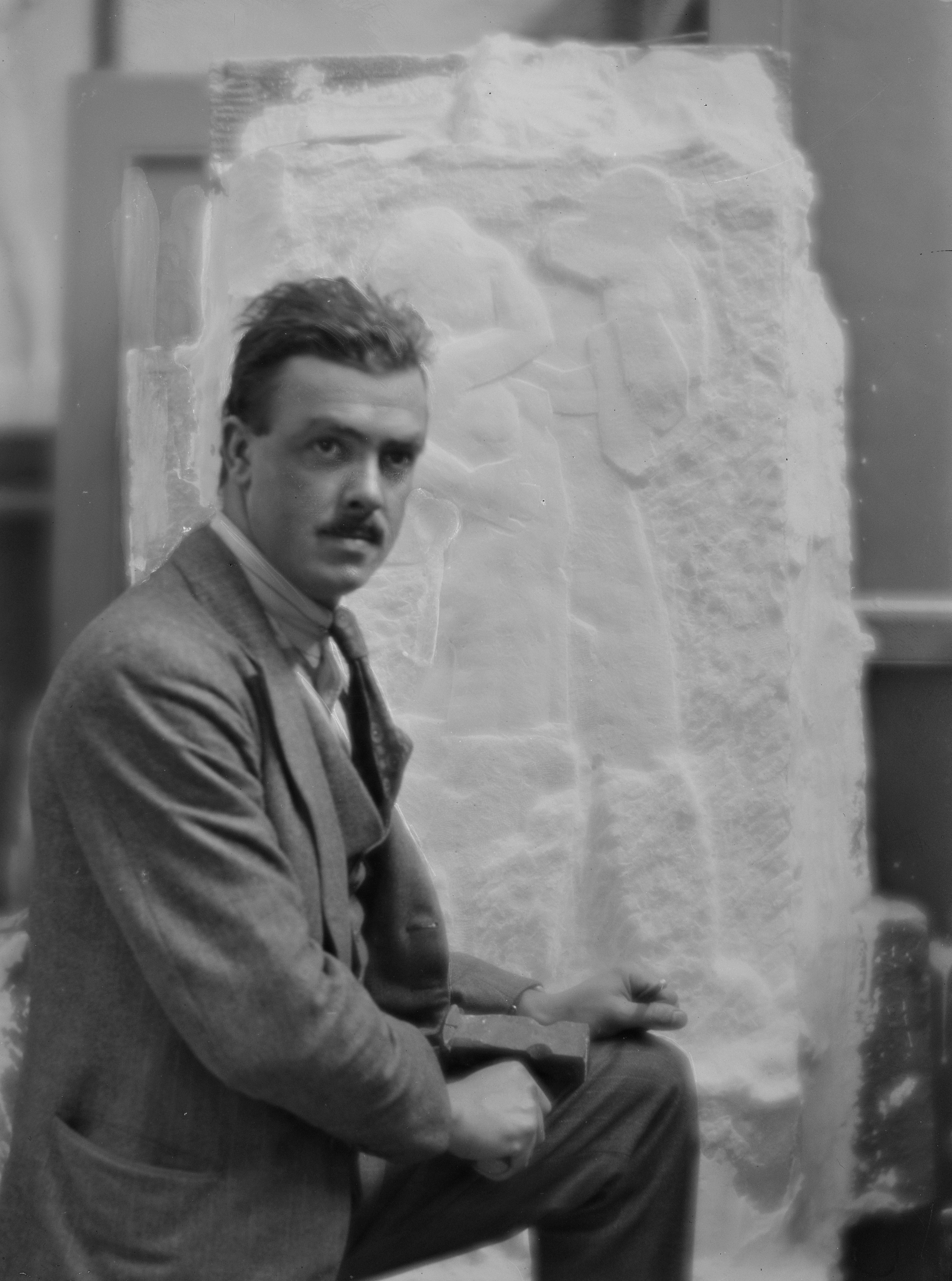
- Hoff in 1923 or 1924
- Born: George Rayner Hoff; 27 November 1894; Braddan, Isle of Man
- Died: 19 November 1937 (aged 42); Waverley, New South Wales, Australia
- Known for: sculpture, particularly for war memorials
- Notable work: Anzac Memorial, Hyde Park, Sydney; King George V Memorial, Old Parliament House, Canberra; William James Farrer Monument, Queanbeyan

George Rayner Hoff (27 November 1894 – 19 November 1937) was a British-born sculptor who mainly worked in Australia. He fought in World War I and is chiefly known for his war memorial work, particularly the sculptures on the Anzac War Memorial in Sydney.

== Early life and training ==
Hoff was born in the parish of Braddan on the Isle of Man, the son of George Hoff, an English-born stone and wood carver of Dutch descent. The family later moved to Nottingham. Hoff began helping his father on architectural commissions at a very young age and attended the Nottingham School of Art. During World War I, he was in the British Army and fought in the trenches in France, an experience from which he was to draw most passionately in the creation of his various war memorials. Later in the war, he made maps based on aerial photographs.

Returning from the trenches following the War he enrolled in the Royal College of Art in London studying under Francis Derwent Wood for three years. In 1922, Hoff won the British Prix de Rome which allowed him the opportunity to study in Rome.

== Australian work ==
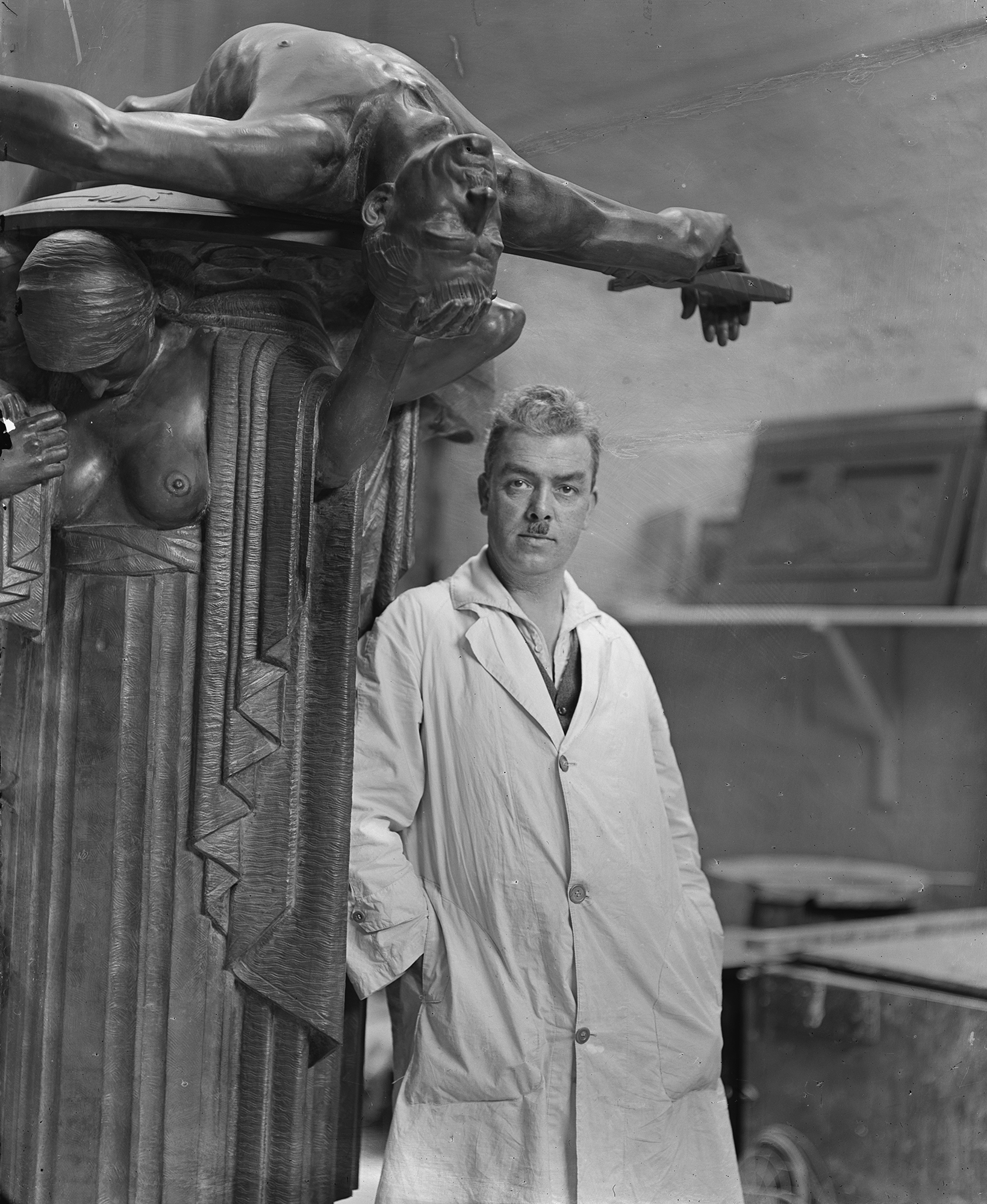
Portrait of sculptor Rayner Hoff, Sydney, ca. 1934, by Harold Cazneaux

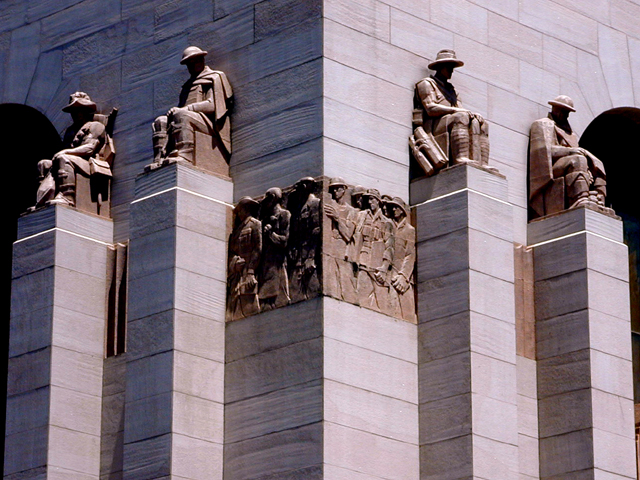
Detail of monumental sculptures and reliefs, ANZAC War Memorial (1934), Hyde Park, Sydney.

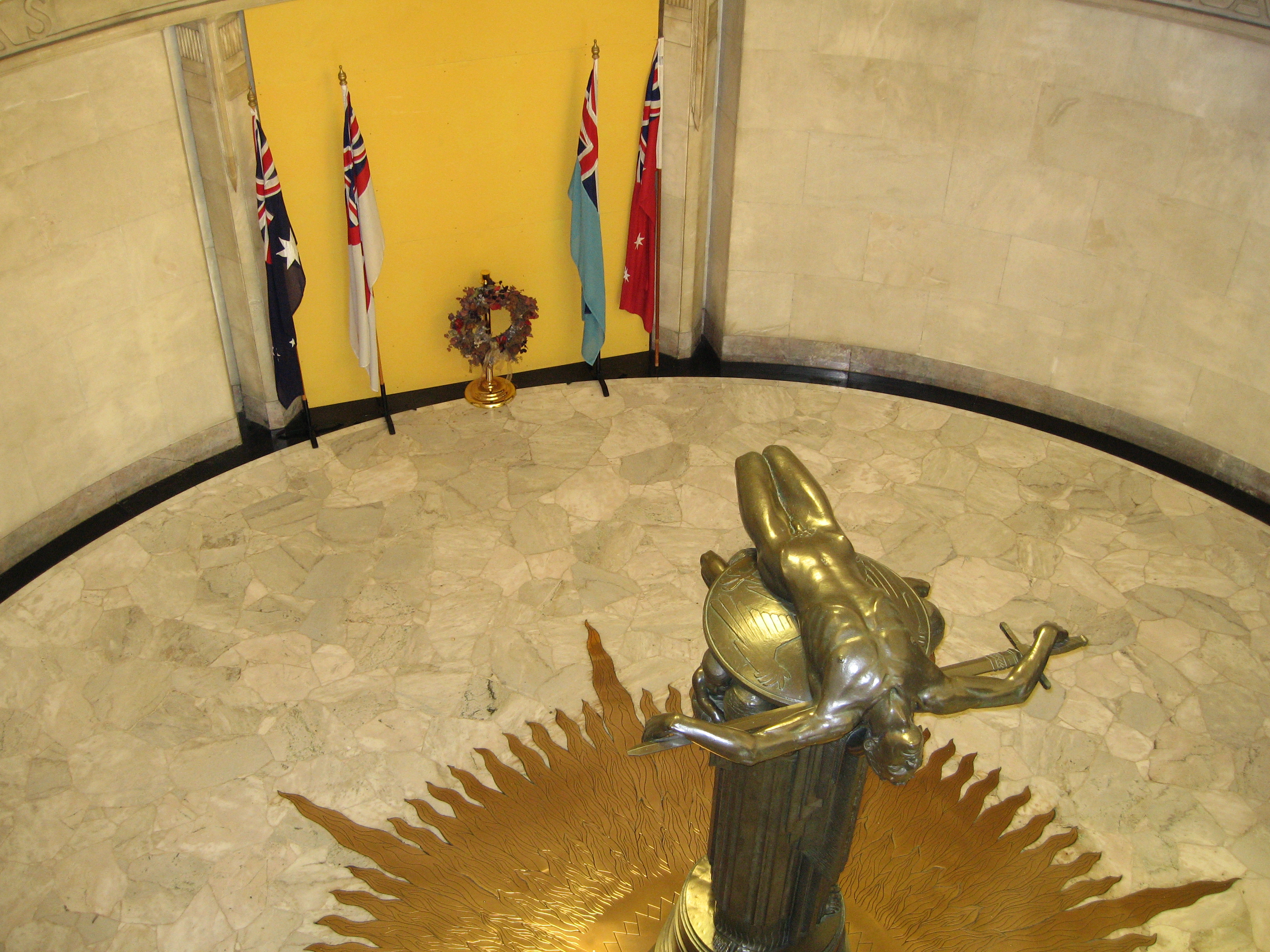
Sacrifice, Anzac War Memorial

The 1972 Holden logo evolved from the original designed by Hoff in 1928 (left).

His modelling is in a lyrical, classical art-deco manner which effortlessly combines sensuous curves with geometric line patterns.

Among his works is the emblem of the Holden Australian car company, a stylised 'Lion and Stone' symbol representing a legend of man's invention of the wheel.

== Architectural sculpture ==
The Anzac War Memorial, completed in 1934, is the main commemorative military monument in Sydney, designed by C. Bruce Dellit, has an exterior adorned with monumental figural reliefs and sculptures by Rayner Hoff, and is arguably the finest Art Deco structure in Australia.

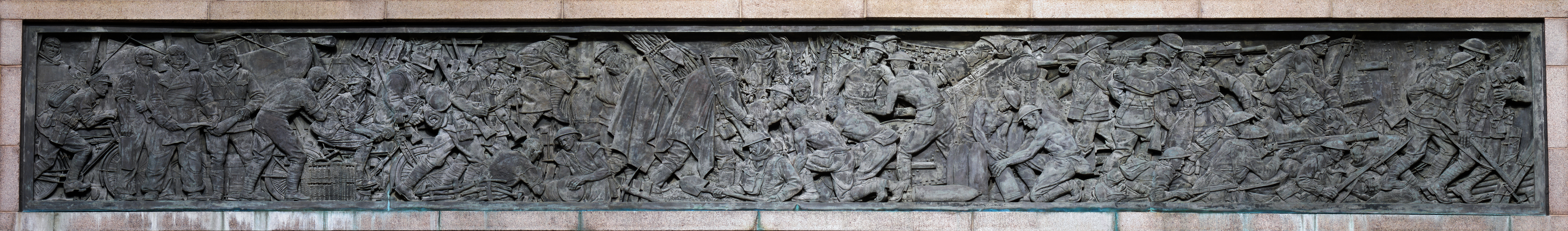
A ten-metre-long bronze relief, over the west door of the Sydney ANZAC War Memorial. These two sculptures illustrate the functions and activities of elements of the Australian Imperial Forces overseas.

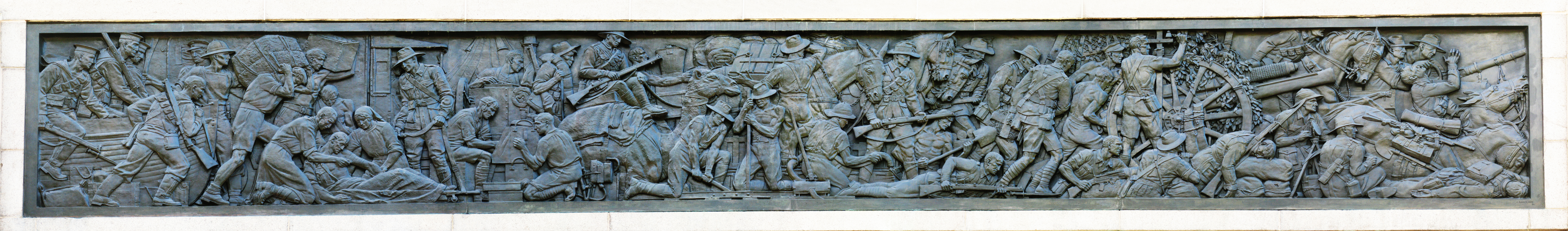
The other bronze relief, over the east door.

- Medallions for various University of Sydney buildings, 1924
- Egyptian Room, Royal Arch Masonic Temple at 23-35 New Canterbury Road, Petersham 1927.
- The Spirit of Womanhood, National War Memorial, Adelaide, South Australia, 1927–30
- Figures and panels, Anzac War Memorial, Hyde Park, Sydney, Australia, 1931–34
- Theatre Arts & Pan Liberty Theatre, Sydney, Australia, 1934
- Ride of the Valkyries relief panel, Hotel Manly, Manly, Australia, 1935
- Panels, Hotel Sydney, Sydney, Australia, 1935
- Relief panels, City Mutual Life Insurance building, Sydney, Australia, 1936
- Mercury, Transportation House, Sydney, Australia, 1938

== Other works ==
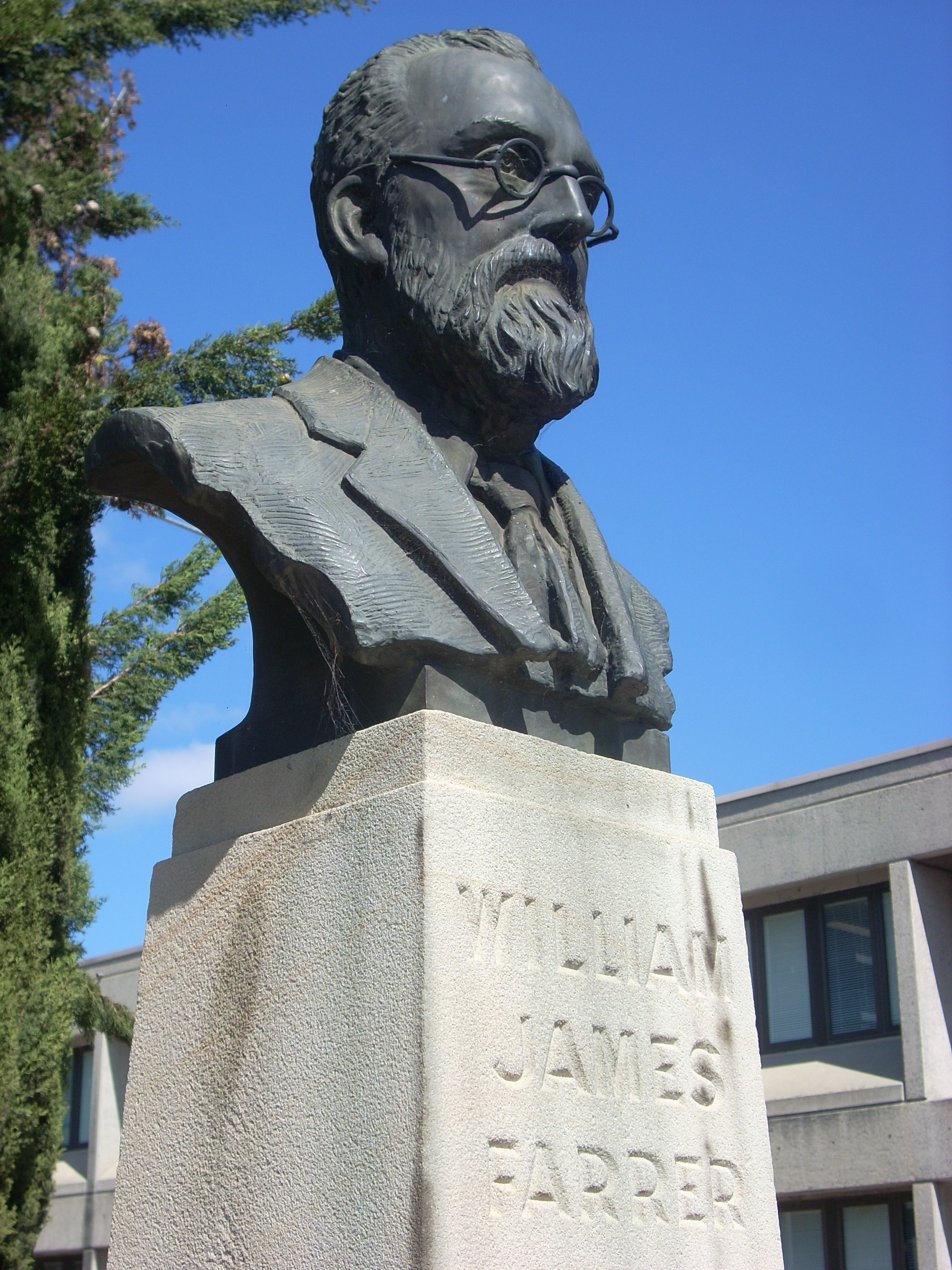
William Farrer bust

- War memorial panels, Dubbo, New South Wales
- Australian Venus, Art Gallery of New South Wales, 1927
- Sacrifice, figure inside Anzac Memorial, Hyde Park, Sydney, 1934
- Thomas Ranken Lyle Medal for outstanding research by an Australian mathematician or physicist, first awarded in 1935.
- Bust of William Farrer in Queanbeyan, New South Wales, 1937
- King George V Memorial, Canberra, 1937-53 (designed by Hoff and finished by John Moorefield following Hoff's death)
- Bronze memorial plaque to John Irvine Hunter in Wesley College, University of Sydney
- Sir John Sulman Medal for the NSW Chapter of the Royal Australian Institute of Architects, 1934

== Death ==
Hoff died on 19 November 1937, eight days before his 43rd birthday, and was survived by his wife and two daughters.
