= Dick Sawle =

British Falkland Islands politician (born 1954)

The Honourable Dick Sawle JP
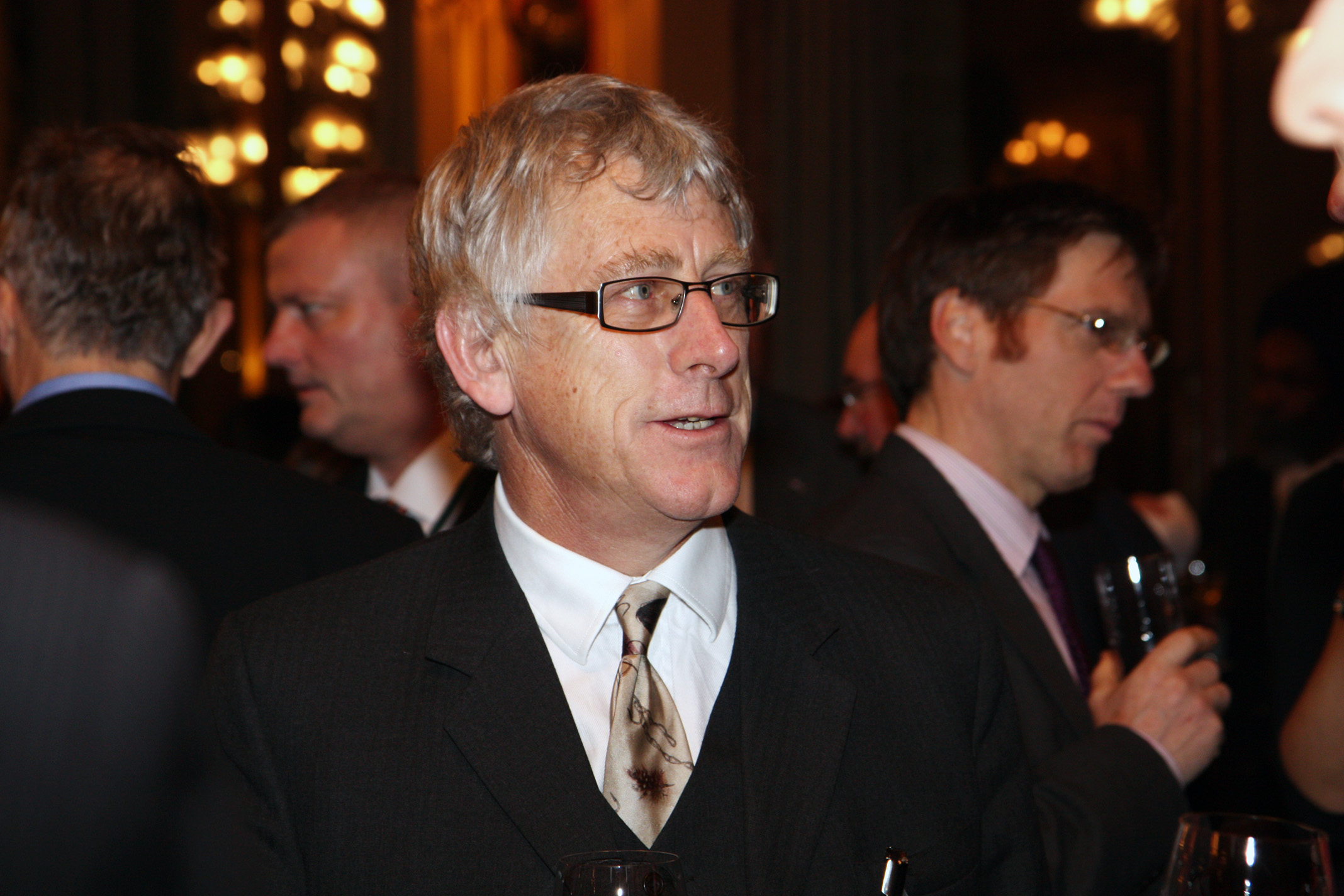

Member of the Falkland Islands Legislative Assembly for Stanley
- In office 5 November 2009 – 7 November 2013
- Preceded by: John Birmingham
- Succeeded by: Michael Poole

Personal details
- Born: 1954 (age 71–72) Sheffield, England
- Party: Nonpartisan
- Spouse: Judith
- Children: Jamie and Felicity
- Education: University of Liverpool

Richard Sawle (born 1954) is a British born, Falkland Islands politician, who has been Complaints Commissioner since 15 January 2014 and previously served as a Member of the Legislative Assembly for the Stanley constituency from 2009 until 2013.

Sawle was born in Sheffield and brought up in Leyland, Lancashire. He went on to study Spanish, South American Studies and Egyptology at the University of Liverpool. In 1986 Sawle emigrated to the Falkland Islands, working as a teacher at Stanley Senior School for the next two years. In 1988 he married Judith and they founded the fishing company Seaview Ltd. Sawle became a Justice of the Peace in 1999, and in 2009 he retired from his company and was elected to the Legislative Assembly.

Following the 30th anniversary of the Falklands War in 2012 and the sovereignty referendum in 2013, Sawle began a campaign to promote the interests of the Falkland Islanders internationally. This included attending parliamentary and business meetings in Brazil, Uruguay, and other Latin American nations. Sawle also appeared on Newsnight, The Daily Politics and wrote an editorial in The Guardian to further promote the Falklands in the UK. Sawle did not stand for re-election in the 2013 general election. In January 2014 Sawle was appointed Complaints Commissioner for the Falklands by Governor Nigel Heywood.
