= Laura Kanushu =

Ugandan politician

Laura Kanushu Honorable
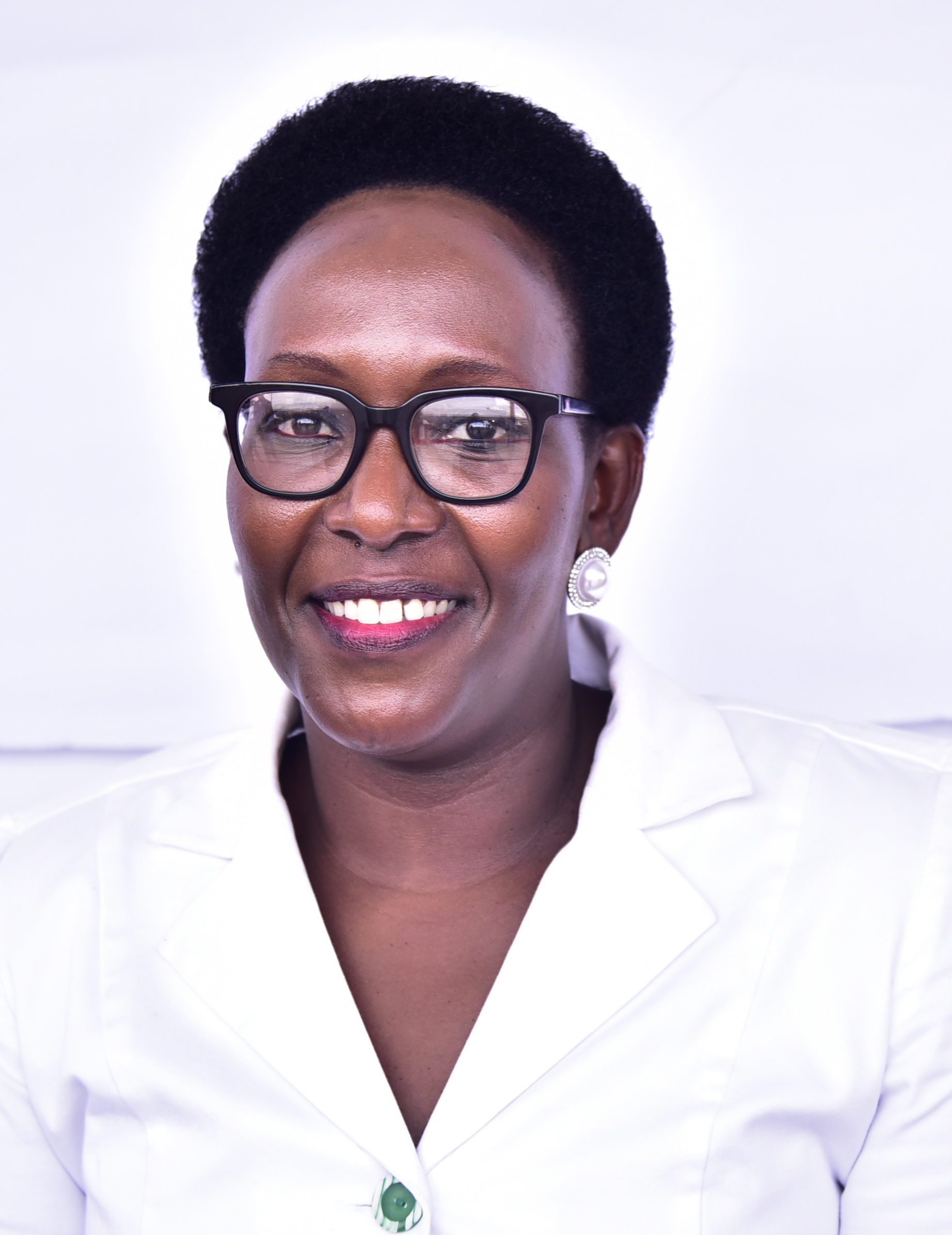
- Laura Kanushu

Member of Parliament for People with Disabilities
- Incumbent
- Assumed office 2021

Personal details
- Party: National Resistance Movement
- Occupation: Lawyer, Politician, Human Rights Advocate

Laura Kanushu is a Ugandan lawyer, politician and legislator, representing persons with disabilities in the parliament of Uganda. She is a member of the National Resistance Movement (NRM) a party under the chairmanship of Yoweri Kaguta Museveni, President of the Republic of Uganda.

== Background and education ==
Kanushu did a Bachelors of Law degree from the Makerere University Law School.

== Career ==
=== Advocacy for People With Disabilities ===
Laura Kanushu is a human rights advocate especially for people with disabilities. She is the executive director of Legal Action for People with disabilities (LAPD).

=== Politics ===
She is an executive member of the Uganda women Parliamentary Association (UWOPA) as Person with Disabilities representative. She has addressed the discrimination and structural barrier faced by people with disabilities in education, public infrastructure and legal access. She has spoken publicly about the challenges disabled students face in accessing university facilities and the importance of inclusive law and policy.

As an MP, Kanushu has been involved in legislative committees that deal with social development and governance: She is the Deputy Chairperson of the Committee on Gender, Labour and Social Development.

In the parliament of Uganda, Kanushu is a member of the committee on rules, privileges and discipline. She is also a member of the Gender Labour and Social development committee.

In 2023, she was named a member of a select parliamentary committee to investigate operations at the National Social Security Fund(NSSF) an inquiry into governance and fund management.

=== Policy advocacy ===
Kanushu has used her Parliamentary platform to advocate for social protection measures and disability inclusive policies. For example, she highlighted the need for serve disabilities grant a proposed monthly support for families caring for children with profound disability to improve livelihoods and reduce barriers to education and care.

She has also advocated for improved economic empowerment programs targeting women and Persons with disabilities, welcoming government initiatives such as the GROW project aimed at supporting women in business.

Kanushu has spoken out on health and inclusion issues like the need for inclusive HIV service and address stigma and improve access to care for PWDs.

== See also ==
- List of members of the tenth Parliament of Uganda
- Hellen Adoa
- Prossy Akampurira
- Beatrice Akello Akori
- Grace Akello
