= Egyptian Room, Royal Arch Masonic Temple =

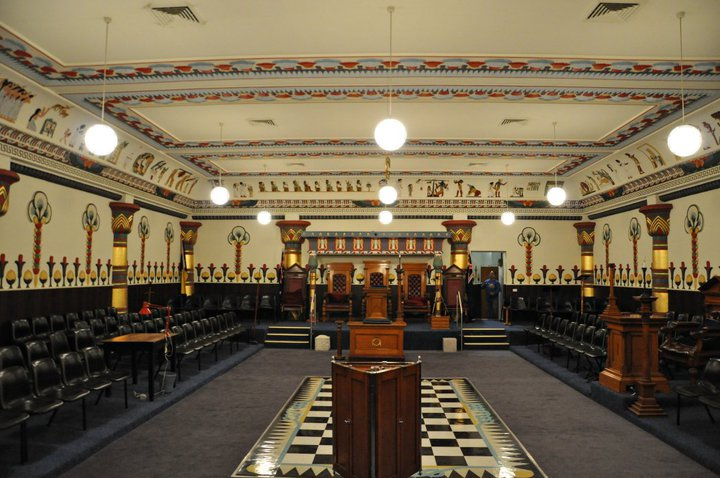
- The Egyptian room, Freemason Hall in Petersham, 2014

- Location within Sydney Location within Australia
- 33.8958°S 151.1550°E
- Location: 23-35 New Canterbury Road, Petersham, Inner West Council, Sydney, New South Wales, Australia

History
- Built: 1927

Site notes
- Architect: A. Phipps Coles

New South Wales Heritage Register
- Official name: Egyptian Room Scottish Temple; The Egyptian Room within the Scottish Royal Arch Temple; Masonic Temple
- Type: state heritage (built)
- Designated: 2 April 1999
- Reference no.: 118
- Type: Hall Masonic
- Category: Community Facilities
- Builders: Sculptor: Rayner Hoff; Charles Everett (decoration); G. R. Lumb and Sons (plaster modelling)

The Egyptian Room, Royal Arch Masonic Temple is a heritage-listed Masonic Lodge meeting room at 23-35 New Canterbury Road, Petersham, New South Wales, a suburb of Sydney, Australia. It was designed by A. Phipps Coles. Originally built in 1927 for the Scottish Royal Arch Temple in College Street, Sydney, it was re-erected in 1977 at the Royal Arch Temple in Petersham. Craftsmen who worked on the room included Rayner Hoff (sculptor), Charles Everett (decoration) and G. R. Lumb and Sons (plaster modelling). It was added to the New South Wales State Heritage Register on 2 April 1999.

== History ==
The Egyptian Room was originally built within the Scottish Royal Arch Temple at 22-24 College Street, Sydney (now replaced by Anzac House) in 1927, on the basis of a design by the architect Mr A. Phipps Coles. The sculptor was Mr G Rayner Hoff, best known for his work on the Sydney War Memorial. The decorator was Charles Everett and the plaster modelling was undertaken by G.R. Lumb and Sons. Painters from Lumb and Sons painted the original vignettes.

When the original Masonic Temple in College Street was to be demolished in 1969 the plaster work was carefully removed and placed in storage. The Grand Superintendent, Dr F.J. Radcliff, planned the relocation of the Egyptian Room and eventually a suitable space was found in the Royal Arch Temple in Petersham. The Egyptian Room was re-erected in 1977 by craftsmen from G.R. Lumb and Sons, the firm which had originally constructed it.

The Egyptian Room was classified by the National Trust of Australia (NSW) in August 1979.

Following its National Trust classification the Supreme Grand Chapter of Royal Arch Freemasons of Scotland nominated the interior of the Egyptian Room for a Permanent Conservation Order in October 1979. Following consideration by the Heritage Council of NSW a Permanent Conservation Order was placed over it on 12 December 1980. It was transferred to the State Heritage Register on 2 April 1999.

== Description ==
Located within the Scottish Royal Arch Masonic Temple is the "Egyptian Room" that is decorated in the style of Ancient Egypt, with a magnificent frieze reproducing illustrations from the Papyrus of Ani, an Egyptian funerary text of about 1450 BC. The decorations are sculpted in low relief plaster and painted in rich colours carefully chosen for their authenticity.

The major feature of the Egyptian Room is the frieze which depicts the funeral procession and burial rites of the scribe, Ani, together with the after-death trials of his soul before the gods. These scenes come from a version of what is popularly known as "The Book of the Dead", but which, in fact is entitled "The Book of Coming Forth By Day" - that is, the day of the after-life. Such papyri were intended as "guide books" for the soul in its after-death condition so that it could negotiate the perils which it would be encountering in the world beyond the grave. The Egyptian texts, which have been found in tombs from around 1600 to 1300 BC assume that the dead person's ka (or spirit body) will encounter various trials (including demons of various forms), before facing judgement and (hopefully) resurrection into a new life.

The Papyrus of Ani, from which the vignettes around the Room have been accurately reproduced, was acquired by the British Museum about 1935 and had been written in the 18th Dynasty (about 1450 BC) for Ani, "Veritable royal scribe, scribe and accountant of the offerings of all the gods, governor of the granary of the Lords of Abydos, scribe of the offerings of the Lords of Thebes". His wife Tutu, a member of the royal college of singers in the temple of Amen-Ra at Thebes had died some years before him, but she appears in some of the vignettes.

Selections from the papyrus, which measures some seventy-eight feet - were made for reproduction around the Egyptian Room. They trace the experience of the soul of Ani from his funeral (represented on the left hand wall) to his judgement in the entrance of the Hall of Truth (represented in the east).

That section of the frieze in the east, over the throne for the Master of the Lodge, shows the judgement in which the dead man's soul, represented by his heart, was placed on a balance and weighed against truth and righteousness (Maat), represented by a feather.

The balance is held by the jackal-headed god, Anubis. If Ani's heart is heavier than the feather he is condemned. However, if he is found righteous "His heart is found righteous coming forth from the balance" and he is taken before Osiris in the Hall of Truth.

The decoration throughout the rest of the Room is also based on Egyptian sources. For example, over the Junior Warden's Chair (in the centre of the right-hand wall) is a relief reproducing a Stele (or tomb-tablet) of the 20th Dynasty (about 1200 BC) which shows a worshipper making an offering to Osiris as god of the underworld.

Around the room stand pillars in classical Egyptian design. Gold-leaf features prominently in the decorations.

=== Modifications and dates ===
- 1927 - original construction at 22-24 College Street, Sydney
- 1969 - placed in storage
- 1977 - re-erected in the Royal Arch Masonic Temple, Petersham

== Heritage listing ==
The Egyptian Room of the Royal Arch Temple at Petersham is unique for its superb decorative frieze which faithfully reproduces illustrations from the text of the Papyrus of Ani, an Egyptian Funerary text dating from about 1450 B.C. The decorations are finely sculpted in low relief plaster and picked out in rich authentic colours, while lotus headed columns support decorative bands of stylised Egyptian motifs and ornaments.

The Egyptian Room decorative theme has some precedent in Masonic memorial chambers but the scale and level of elaboration is unique in Australia. The survival of such rich and extensive decoration is rare, not only in Masonic Temples but in large scale interiors generally.

The Egyptian Room, Royal Arch Masonic Temple was listed on the New South Wales State Heritage Register on 2 April 1999.
