= Commonwealth Youth Parliament =

The Commonwealth Youth Parliament is an annual gathering hosted by the Commonwealth Parliamentary Association (CPA). It brings together young people aged 18–29 from across the Commonwealth of Nations to discuss issues of democracy and governance.

Each member parliament of the Commonwealth Parliamentary Association has the opportunity to nominate up to two delegates to attend the Commonwealth Youth Parliament.

The Commonwealth Youth Parliament rotates annually through the nine regions of the Commonwealth Parliamentary Association.

The 1st Commonwealth Youth Parliament was held in Manchester, United Kingdom in 1997 and the 2nd Commonwealth Youth Parliament returned to Manchester, United Kingdom from 22-24 November 2000.

The 3rd Commonwealth Youth Parliament was held in Brisbane, Australia, hosted by the Parliament of Queensland from 19 to 23 April 2005.

The 4th Commonwealth Youth Parliament was held at the Parliament of the United Kingdom in Westminster, United Kingdom from 6 to 10 September 2011 and the 5th Commonwealth Youth Parliament returned to Westminster from 4 to 7 December 2012.

The 6th Commonwealth Youth Parliament was held in 2014 in Mmabatho, South Africa and the 7th Commonwealth Youth Parliament was held in November 2015 in Darwin, Australia hosted by the Northern Territory Legislative Assembly.

The 8th Commonwealth Youth Parliament was held in British Columbia, Canada in 2016. The 9th Commonwealth Youth Parliament was hosted by the States of Jersey in 2018.

In 2019, the 10th Commonwealth Youth Parliament was hosted by the Delhi Legislative Assembly in India. The 11th Commonwealth Youth Parliament in 2022 was hosted by the Parliament of Trinidad and Tobago.

The 12th Commonwealth Youth Parliament was hosted by the New Zealand Parliament in Wellington from 2 to 5 September 2024.
