= Prossy Akampurira =

Ugandan politician

Prossy Akampulira Mbabazi
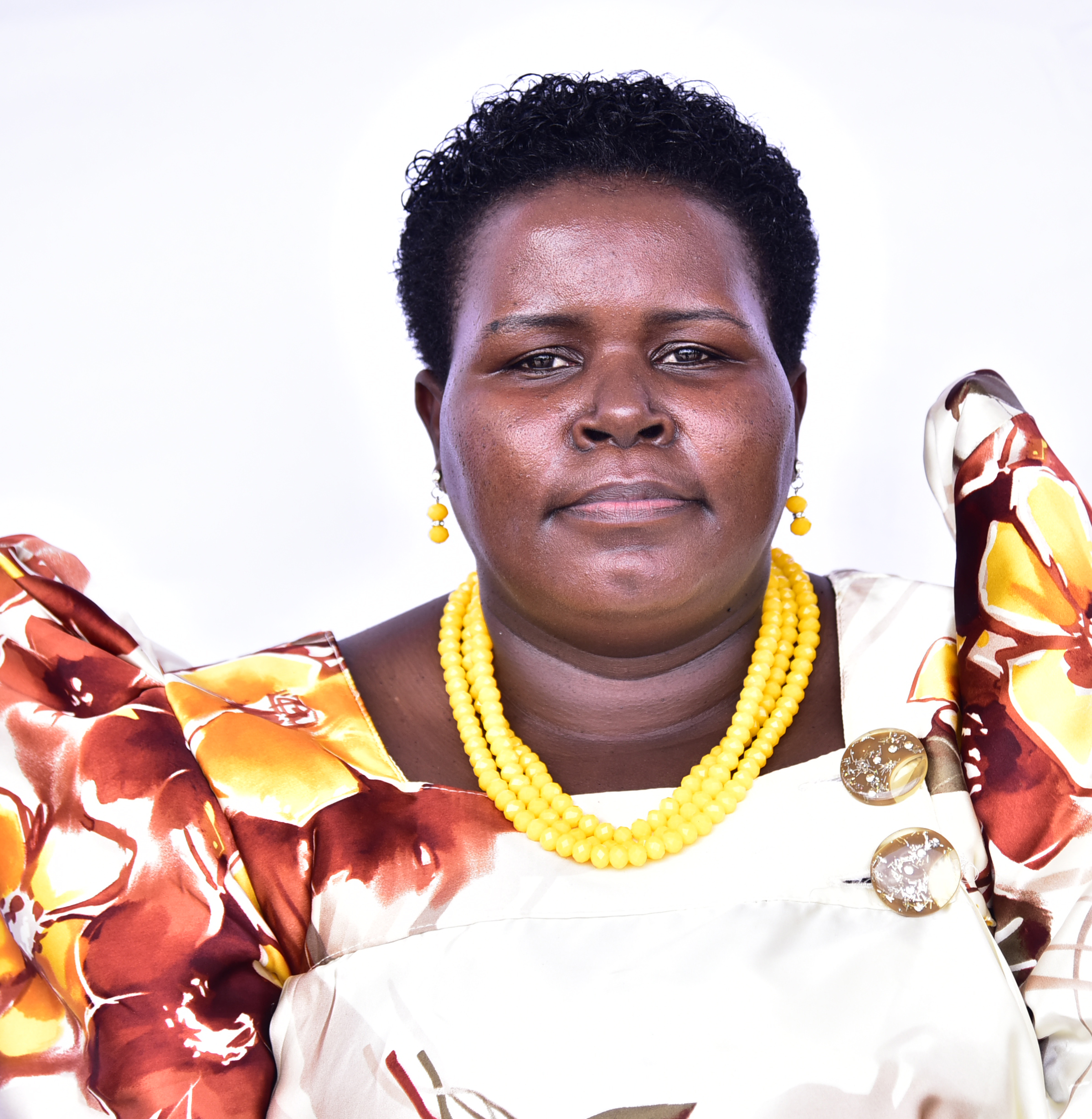
- Citizenship: Ugandan
- Education: Makerere University
- Years active: 2016-todate
- Known for: Politics
- Title: Member of Parliament

Prossy Akampurira Mbabazi (born 8 December 1987) is a Ugandan politician and woman member of parliament. In 2016, she was elected as a woman representative in parliament for Rubanda district, re-elected for the 2nd term in office in the 2021 Uganda General elections.

She is a member of the ruling National Resistance Movement political party.

== Early life and education ==
Prossy was born on 8 December 1987. She completed her primary school education in 2000 at Rubaga Girls primary school, In 2004 Prossy completed her Uganda Certificate of Education (UCE) for lower secondary education at St Mary's secondary school. She completed her advanced secondary level known as Uganda Advanced Certification of Education (UACE) in 2007 at Hana Mixed Secondary school. In 2013, she graduated from Makerere University with a Bachelor's degree of Science in Education in Kampala.

== Other responsibilities ==
| Job Title | Organisation | Period Of Work | |
|---|---|---|---|
| Member of Parliament | Parliament of Uganda | 2016 to 2021 | 2021-todate |
| Business Director | FREAM Investments Ltd | 2012–2016 | |
| Teacher | Kajjansi Progressive S.S. | 2010–2012 | |

== See also ==
- List of members of the eleventh Parliament of Uganda
- List of members of the tenth Parliament of Uganda
- Rubanda District
