= Kingston Foreshore Redevelopment =

Coordinates: 35.3127°S 149.1461°E

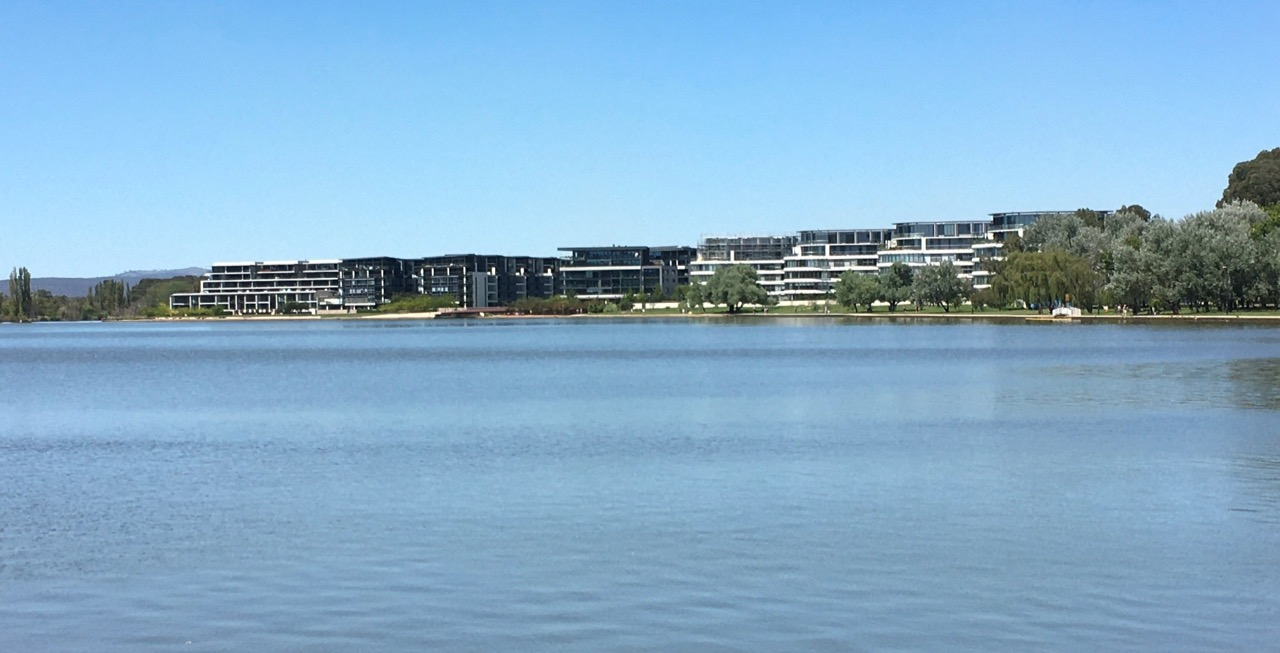
View of Kingston Foreshore from Bowen Park.

The Kingston Foreshore Redevelopment is a major urban renewal program in the suburb of Kingston on the southern shore of Lake Burley Griffin in Canberra, the capital of Australia.

This meant that at the start of the 21st century, the layout of the lake was significantly altered for the first time since its construction, on the southern shore of the East Basin, which was planned in 1997. A bidding process was enacted, and six construction firms were shortlisted for the contract in early 2003. In April 2007, the government awarded the contract, worth 1 billion dollars, to McMahon Contractors. Construction began in July.

Multimillion-dollar luxury apartment complexes were built in the suburb of Kingston, with properties selling for record-breaking prices. After a dispute over the environmental impact of the development, due to a lack of tree and wastewater recycling facilities in the area, building works commenced. In 2007, work started to reclaim land from the lakebed to form a harbour, which is expected to turn the area into an entertainment hub.

It is expected that 1,700–1,800 dwellings or apartments will be constructed and that 7,000 square metres will be set aside for retail, 30,000 square metres for office blocks and 14,000 square metres for arts and cultural uses, while 19 hectares will be open to the public. Construction is expected to be complete by 2010, with a new island being created in the harbour.

The Kingston Powerhouse, which used to provide the city's power supply, was converted into the Canberra Glassworks in 2007, 50 years after the electricity generators stopped. The institution is the only Australian facility completely dedicated to contemporary glass art. A 22 m high tower of glass and light named Touching Lightly, will be built at Kingston after being approved by the government in April 2009. It was selected from 42 submissions. An environmentally friendly structure it uses light emitting diodes, and is expected to be completed in mid-2009 at a cost of $450,000.
