= Forrest, Australian Capital Territory =

Suburb of Canberra, Australia

Forrest
- Suburb
- Coordinates: 35°19′05″S 149°07′30″E
- Country: Australia
- State: Australian Capital Territory
- City: Canberra
- District: South Canberra
- Location: 5 km (3.1 mi) S of Canberra CBD; 12 km (7.5 mi) W of Queanbeyan; 96 km (60 mi) SW of Goulburn; 293 km (182 mi) SW of Sydney
- Established: 1926

Government
  - Territory electorate: Murrumbidgee
  - Federal division: Canberra

Area
  - Total: 1.57 km^{2} (0.61 sq mi)
- Elevation: 590 m (1,940 ft)

Population
  - Total: 1,827 (SAL 2021)
  - Density: 759/km^{2} (1,970/sq mi)
- Postcode: 2603
- Gazetted: 20 September 1928
Suburbs around Forrest
Yarralumla	Capital Hill	Barton
Deakin	Forrest	Kingston
Red Hill	Red Hill	Griffith

Forrest (postcode: 2603) is a suburb of Canberra, Australian Capital Territory, Australia. Forrest is named after Sir John Forrest, an explorer, legislator, federalist, Premier of Western Australia, and one of the fathers of the Australian Constitution. Streets in Forrest are named after explorers and governors. According to the Australian Bureau of Statistics, Forrest is the second most socio-economically advantaged location in Australia after the neighbouring suburb of Barton.

Forrest is one of the few suburbs in Canberra built to the original Canberra plans. It contains many circular and geometric patterns in its streets and can be quite confusing to drive in. Forrest was renamed from the earlier suburb Blandfordia (the name of the Christmas Bell) and gazetted as a suburb in 1928. South Blandfordia became part of the new suburb of Griffith at the same time.

The original residents of Forrest were mostly senior public servants who were moved from Melbourne.

== Demographics ==
In the 2021 census, the population of Forrest was 1,827; 0.4% were Indigenous and 72.1% were born in Australia. 36.5% of dwellings were separate houses (compared to the Australian average of 72.3%), 16.9% were semi-detached, row or terrace houses (Australian average: 12.6%) and 46.6% were flats, units or apartments (Australian average: 14.2%). 42.5% of the population were professionals, compared to the Australian average of 24.0%. 20.5% worked in central government administration, compared to the Australian average of 1.1% and the Canberra-wide average of 17.1%. The median weekly personal income for people aged 15 years and over was $1,816, compared to the median Australian income of $805. The weekly median family income was $4,532, as compared to the Australian weekly median family income of $2,120.

== Education ==
Forrest Primary School is situated in Hobart Avenue in Forrest. It caters for students in years P-6. The students wear red and yellow. The school celebrated its fiftieth anniversary on 4 April 2008.

Forrest residents get preference for:

- Forrest Primary
- Telopea Park School (for high school)
- Narrabundah College

== Suburb amenities ==
The suburb includes part of the Manuka shopping centre. The suburb also contains a government run primary school.

Forrest together with the eastern part of Deakin and the northern part of Red Hill (sometimes called "old Deakin" and "old Red Hill"), represents the most prestigious residential area in Canberra. Most of the area is detached dwellings in which a 1600 m^{2} block would be on the small side, and 2000 m^{2} blocks are not atypical.

== Notable places ==
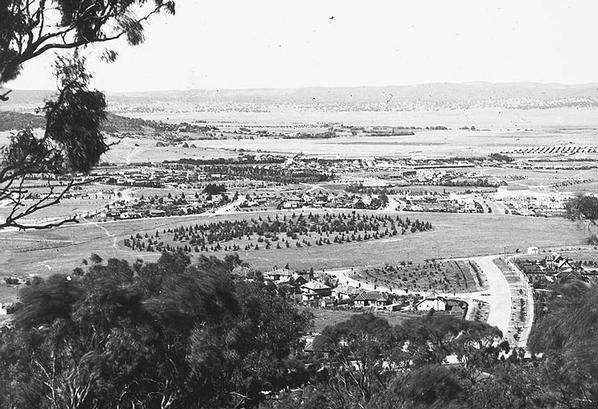
The view from Red Hill across Collins Park and Eastlake (now Kingston) about 1927 or 1928. Rous Crescent and Moresby Streets can be seen in the foreground

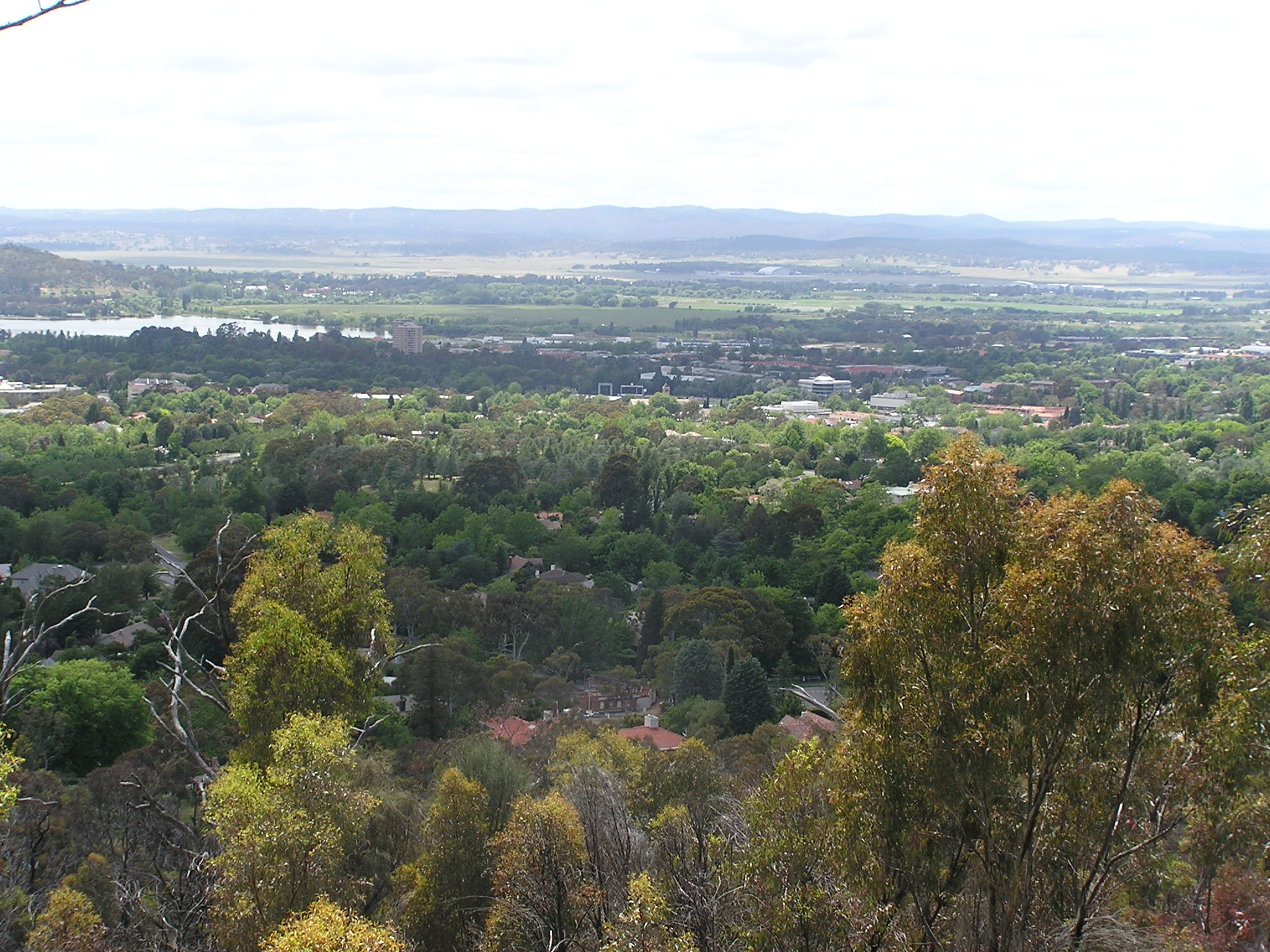
A similar view in November 2005

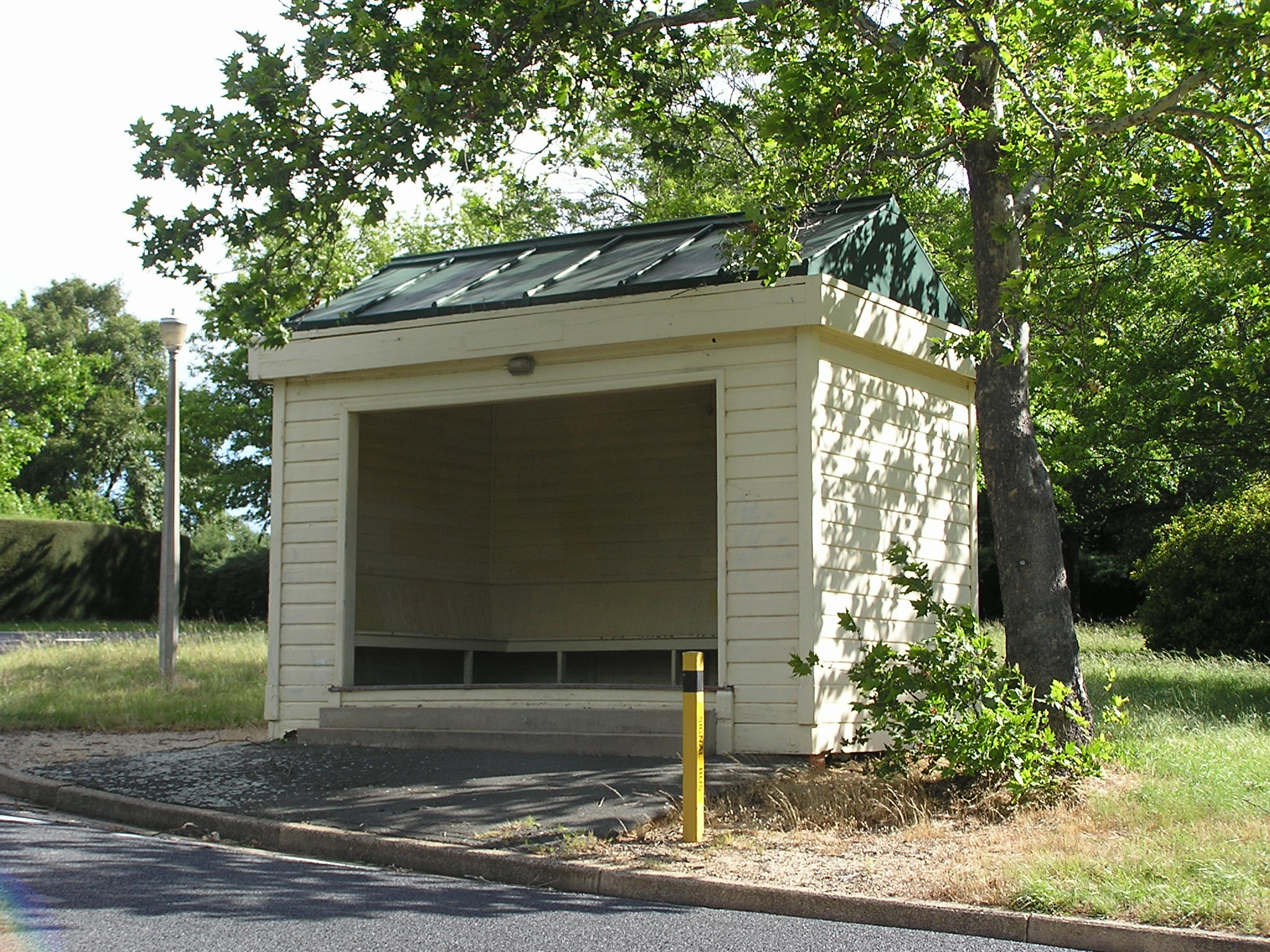
Bus shelter on Arthur Circle

Forrest includes several areas that are listed by the ACT Heritage Council, covering most of the suburb:

- The Blandfordia 4 Precinct, bounded by Arthur Circle, Moresby Street, Mugga Way, Melbourne Avenue and Empire Circuit, which was developed as three separate residential subdivisions between 1926 and 1965, on Garden City principles.
- The Blandfordia 5 Precinct (this is mostly in Griffith, but includes houses north of Furneaux Street between Arthur Circle and Bougainville Street), the first stage of which was developed in 1926 and 1927 to meet the urgent need for housing for public servants for the opening of the provisional Parliament House in Canberra in 1927. It was planned by Sir John Sulman (and departs from Walter Burley Griffin's intent for the area) and the planting was guided by Thomas Charles Weston.
- The Forrest Housing Precinct (bounded by National Circuit, Hobart Avenue, Arthur Circuit, Empire Circuit and Melbourne Avenue), a Garden City precinct that was mostly developed in 1926 and 1927.
- The Forrest Fire Station Precinct, bounded by Canberra Avenue, Empire Circuit, Manuka Circle and Fitzroy Street, which was built in 1938.
- Manning Clark's house, 11 Tasmania Circle, which was designed by Robin Boyd and is an early example of the Boyd Peninsula House design. It was the residence of the historian, Manning Clark.
- The Burns Memorial, which has been a memorial for over 60 years, symbolising the contribution of those of Scottish descent to Australia's settlement and development and the loyalty and affection in which Scottish communities in Australia held the poet Robert Burns and Scotland at the time.
- St Christopher's Cathedral Precinct, which has been the centre of Catholic worship and education in the Archdiocese of Canberra and Goulburn since 1928.
- Federal Capital Commission (FCC) Type 15 House, 15 Arthur Circle, which was designed in 1926 and, according to the Heritage Council, "comprises the only example of a Federal Capital Commission (FCC) Type 15 residence to have been built in Canberra, being rare as both as a two-storey residence and demonstrating the architectural style of the English Arts and Crafts movement". It is one of four houses of the type that were designed by FCC architects under the influence of Charles Voysey, but the others have been substantially altered.
- St Andrew's Church Precinct, which was opened in 1934 and is one of the largest and most ornate Inter-War Gothic style buildings in the ACT. It has stained glass windows by Norman Carter and John Radecki.
- Free Serbian Orthodox Church, 32 National Circuit, is, according to the Heritage Council, "a successful modern reminder of traditional Serbian church planning." Its murals, which were produced by one elderly artist over a period of nearly 16 years, are also considered noteworthy.

=== Forrest Housing Precinct ===
The Forrest Housing Precinct is subject to conservation measures to preserve its character. Important values being preserved in the suburb are:

- The majority of the precinct was constructed in 1926 – 27 to meet the urgent need to provide housing for public servants prior to the opening of the provisional Parliament House in 1927.
- The Melbourne firm Oakley, Parkes and Scarborough won a 1924 competition to design the housing for the precinct.
- The street layout is directly derived from Griffin's 1913 plan which defined the major axes of Melbourne and Hobart Avenues radiating from Capital Hill and concentric circles. The road layout and subdivision pattern of the precinct are mirrored on the opposite side of Melbourne Avenue.
- The public domain landscaping of the precinct is associated with Thomas Charles Weston, Superintendent of Parks, Gardens and Afforestation, Canberra 1913–1926. Weston's use of Australian native species was an unusual practice for this period.
- The precinct is also a repository of a small number of compatible privately built dwellings designed by early local architects including Kenneth H Oliphant, one of Canberra's first independent architects. Oliphant's work has contributed notably to the character of the urban architecture of Canberra.

=== Street furniture ===
The remnants of street furniture, that is, street signs, fire hydrants and footpath lighting and other elements (including kerbs and gutters and examples of brick drains), are valued for their contribution to the aesthetic of a twentieth-century 'Garden City' planned subdivision. The furniture of the Garden City precincts (Blandfordia 4 and 5 and the Forrest Housing precincts) is now protected.

=== Forrest Fire Station Precinct ===
These buildings are in the block bounded by Canberra Avenue, Empire Circuit, Manuka Circle and Fitzroy Street. They were completed in 1938 and include a former fire station. The buildings are considered important examples of Australian Early Modern Architecture and illustrate a distinctive comparison with the "Federal Capital Architecture" that dominated in Canberra in the 1920s and 30s.

=== Tennyson Crescent Christmas lights ===
The Richards' family home in Tennyson Crescent took out the Guinness World Record for the most lights on a residential property on 4 December 2011. Electricity at the house lights more than half a million Christmas lights. The lighting display opened to visitors, with gold coin donations accepted to raise money for SIDS and Kids ACT.

== Notable people ==
Notable people from or who have lived in Forrest include:

- John Cumpston, CMG, first Director-General of the Australia Department of Health
- Harry Wyatt Wunderly, instrumental in the management and reduction of tuberculosis

== Geology ==
Mount Painter Volcanics, dark grey to green grey dacitic tuff, is found in all except the northeast side. There are a few outcrops of sediments in amongst the volcanics containing shale and sandstone. On the northeast a patch of Ordovician Pittman Formation greywacke outcrops along Canberra Avenue. Black Mountain Sandstone is near St Andrew's church in the north north east. Canberra Formation, calcareous shale, is found in the north. The Deakin Fault runs from State Circle to Manuka separating the Mount Painter Volcanics from the other sediments.
