= St Paul's Church, Manuka =

Church in Griffith, ACT, Australia

St Paul's, Manuka
- St Paul's Church in 2026
- St Paul's, Manuka
- 35°19′13″S 149°08′09″E
- Location: Griffith, ACT
- Country: Australia
- Denomination: Anglican
- Website: stpaulsmanuka.org.au

History
- Status: Parish church
- Dedication: Paul the Apostle
- Consecrated: 1939

Architecture
- Heritage designation: ACT: Listed #157; National: Historic #17894
- Designated: ACT: 2011, National: 1992
- Groundbreaking: 1938

Administration
- Diocese: Canberra and Goulburn
- Parish: St Paul's

Clergy
- Rector: Revd Dr Ben Edwards

St Paul's Church is an Anglican church in the suburb of Griffith in Canberra, Australia. Founded in 1939, it is part of the Anglican Diocese of Canberra and Goulburn. It is listed in the Australian Capital Territory Heritage Register as an "...excellent example of an Inter-War Gothic church with Art Deco influences". It was the first place in Australia to install a combination organ and has the only unrestricted peal of bells in the Australian Capital Territory. It was the first Anglican church to be built following the foundation of Canberra as the national capital (St John's in Reid having been consecrated in 1845, before Canberra's foundation) and is the first Anglican parish in South Canberra. It is situated on the corner of Canberra Avenue and Captain Cook Crescent, opposite Manuka Oval and the Manuka shops.

== History ==
The parish was formed as a district of St John the Baptist Church in Reid in 1914, and a corrugated iron hall was erected on the south side of Canberra at Eastlake (later renamed Kingston) to serve the needs of the nearby workmen's camps. The hall was much used in the 1920s, and a regular congregation gathered there each Sunday with a Sunday school. In the 1930s, there was an active choir, football and cricket teams associated with the congregation. In 1933, a building fund was commenced for a permanent church on a new site. However, as that was during the Great Depression, progress was slow. A design by Sydney architects Burcham Clamp and Son was approved in 1938 and W. J. Perry, a parishioner, successfully tendered to construct it.

The foundation stone for the new church was laid by the Governor-General, Baron Gowrie, on 11 December 1938. The church was dedicated on 6 August 1939, five days after the 25th anniversary of the holding of the first Anglican service in the St Paul's Hall at Kingston. It was the first Anglican church to be built in the district since the 1840s. Initially St Paul's was part of the parish of St John's; the parish of St Paul, Canberra, was proclaimed formally on 26 March 1950. Neville Chynoweth (later the Bishop of Gippsland) was the rector from 1971 to 1974. An organ loft was built in 1988 for Queen Elizabeth II's Australian Bicentenary visit.

== Architecture ==
The church is built of red brick in a style that blends Art Deco and Gothic Revival. The original structure included only the nave but has since been enlarged twice. In 1956 a new sanctuary and unusual bell tower were added. In 2001 two more bays were added to the nave, making it the largest Anglican church in Canberra. Its size and location, as well as the absence of an Anglican cathedral in the national capital, mean that it is often called upon to host major diocesan and national services as well as its parish functions.

=== Bells ===
The church tower contains the only ring of change ringing bells in the Australian Capital Territory. St Paul's is the only representative from the territory in the Australian and New Zealand Association of Bellringers. The eight bells came from a variety of sources, including several cast especially in England and were installed in 2003.

=== Organ ===
The first organ was installed in 1970, the first three-manual organ in Canberra, built primarily from second hand pieces and with many missing pipes. After significant damage due to rain the organ was moved and greatly renovated in 1990.

The church now boasts the first combination (or hybrid) organ in Australia, in which the three manual pipe organ has been substantially augmented by custom digital electronic ranks. "It has 24 pipe stops and 34 electronic, for a total of 57 stops (one stop contains both an electronic and a pipe rank)." In 2009 a new four manual console was installed. In 2012 further enhancements were made to the organ, including the addition of the Trumpets Royal stop and the installation of a new sound box and further pipe ranks for the choir division.

== Bibliography ==
- The History of St. Paul's Church Manuka, 1938-1988. Narrabundah, A.C.T.: The Church. 1988. ISBN 0731655540.
- Braggett, Eddie J. (2010). Camps, settlements and churches : a history of Anglican centres of worship in the inner-south of Canberra. 1913-2010. Barton, A.C.T.: Barton Books. ISBN 9781921577048.
