= Griffith, Australian Capital Territory =

Suburb of Canberra, Australia

Griffith
- Suburb
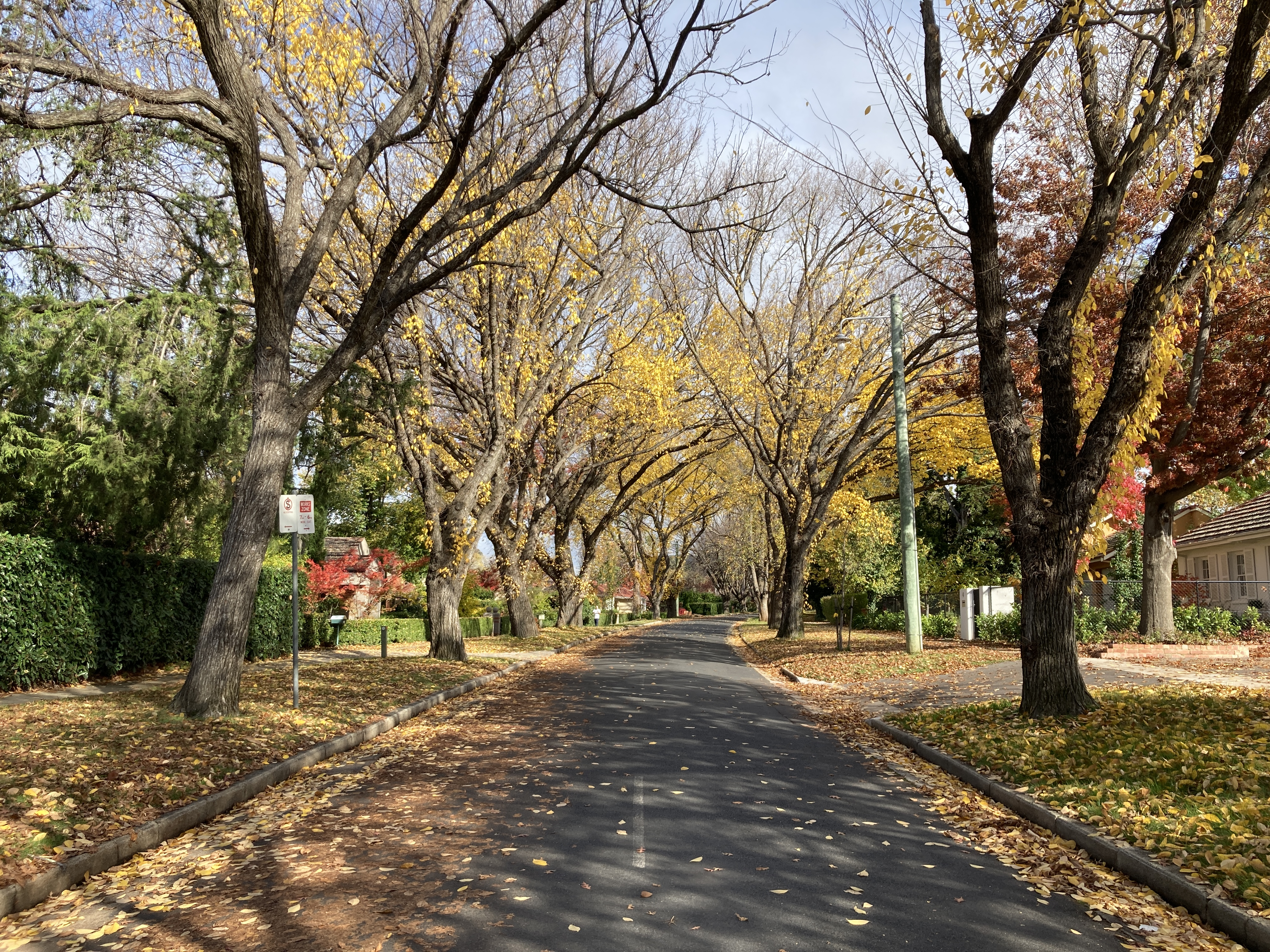
- Grant Crescent in 2022

- Coordinates: 35°19′29″S 149°08′14″E
- Country: Australia
- State: Australian Capital Territory
- City: Canberra
- District: South Canberra
- Location: 7 km (4.3 mi) S of Canberra CBD; 11 km (6.8 mi) W of Queanbeyan; 98 km (61 mi) SW of Goulburn; 295 km (183 mi) SW of Sydney
- Established: 1927

Government
  - Territory electorate: Kurrajong
  - Federal division: Canberra

Area
  - Total: 2.75 km^{2} (1.06 sq mi)
- Elevation: 587 m (1,926 ft)

Population
  - Total: 5,328 (SAL 2021)
- Postcode: 2603
- Gazetted: 20 September 1928
Suburbs around Griffith
Forrest	Barton	Kingston
Red Hill	Griffith	Fyshwick
Red Hill	Narrabundah	Narrabundah

Griffith is an early inner-south suburb of Canberra, Australian Capital Territory, Australia.

Griffith contains the Manuka Shopping Centre, one of the earliest shopping areas built in Canberra. Noted buildings in the suburb include the Russian Embassy and St Paul's Anglican Church. Griffith, sized at approximately 3 km², is one of Canberra's oldest suburbs, with several of its streets designed according to Walter Burley Griffin's original designs for Canberra. The suburb has 20 parks covering nearly 12% of the total area.

== History ==
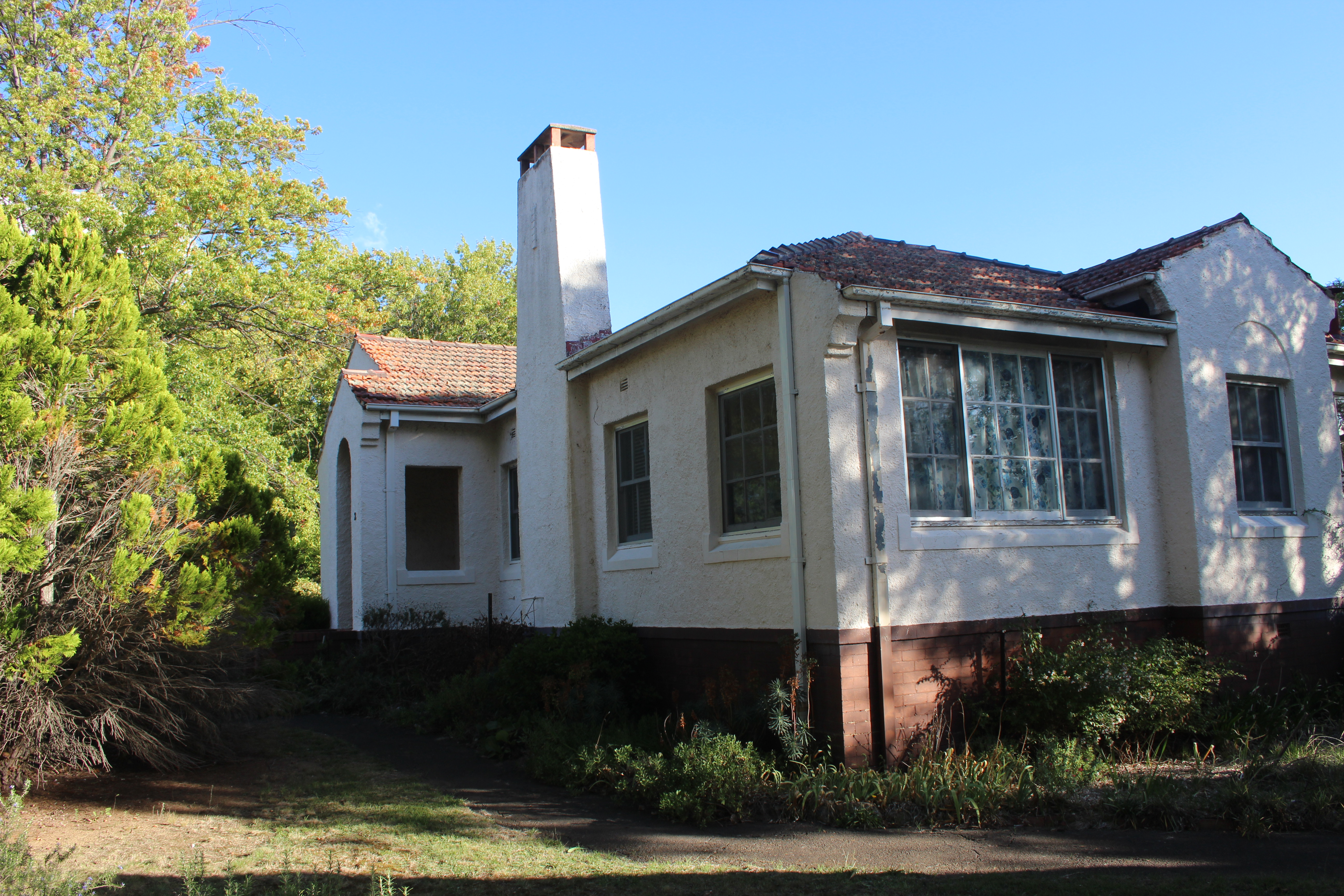
House at corner of Murray and Grant Crescents

Settlement of the Blandfordia 5 Precinct southwest of Manuka began in 1926 and 1927. In 1928, southern Blandfordia (named after the Christmas Bell) was renamed Griffith and northern Blandfordia became Forrest. Griffith is named after Sir Samuel Griffith, who was chosen in 1903 as the first Chief Justice of the High Court of Australia and retained his position until retirement in 1919. Streets in Griffith are named after explorers.

Griffith includes several areas that are listed by the ACT Heritage Council:

- A post-colonisation Ngambri-Ngunnawal campsite is registered on Flinders Way. According to the ACT Heritage Council, "the traffic island at the intersection of Hayes Crescent, Durville Crescent and Flinders Way is associated with Aboriginal use of the area prior to and following European settlement and includes one of the most recently used traditional Ngunnawal camping grounds [used in the 1940s-1950s]."
- The Blandfordia 5 Precinct (bounded by Bougainville and Furneaux streets, Arthur Circle Monaro Crescent and Flinders way, but including houses north of Furneaux Street in Forrest), the first stage of which was developed on Garden City principles in 1926 and 1927 to meet the urgent need for housing for public servants for the opening of the new Parliament House in Canberra in 1927. It was planned by Sir John Sulman (and departs from Walter Burley Griffin’s intent for the area) and the planting was guided by Thomas Charles Weston.
- Griffith Oval No. 1 at the corner of Captain Cook Crescent and Austin Street, the home ground of the Eastern Suburbs Rugby Union Club, which is ringed by mature trees planted between the 1930s and the 1950s.

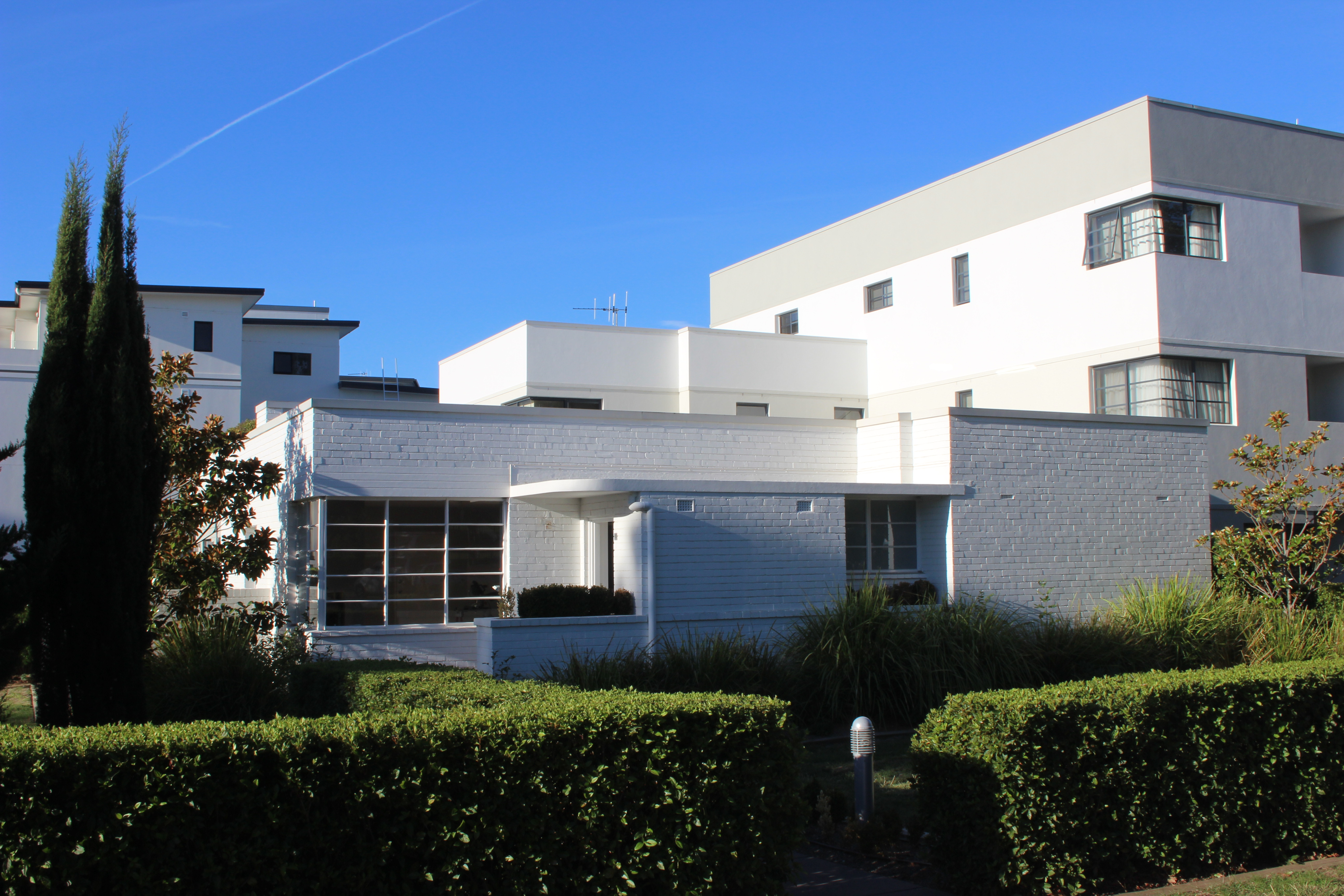
The art deco Whitley House at the corner of Canberra Avenue and Cunningham Street with modern flats behind and to the right

- The Whitley Houses at the corner of Canberra Avenue and the corner of Cunningham Street and Burke and Leichhardt streets, modernist houses designed by Cuthbert Whitley and built in 1939, considered by the ACT Heritage Council to be "among the first government designed and built single-storey detached houses in the Functionalist style in Australia." The Heritage Council has permitted flats to be built behind the houses, but views of the houses from the streets have been partially preserved.
- St Paul’s Church on the corner of Canberra Avenue and Captain Cook Crescent, which the Heritage Council considers to be an excellent example of an Inter-War Gothic church with Art Deco influences. The church was designed by Sydney Architects Burcham Clamp and Son and dedicated on 6 August 1939.
- The former Petrov residence at 7 Lockyer Street, which was occupied by Vladimir Mikhaylovich Petrov and his wife, Evdokia prior to the Petrov Affair. The Heritage Council considers that "the house and its grounds preserve the outward picture of suburban normality and domesticity that the Petrovs presented to 1950s Canberra, a picture that belied the important ramifications their defection had in Australia and internationally. Their defection was a defining event of the Cold War in Australia".

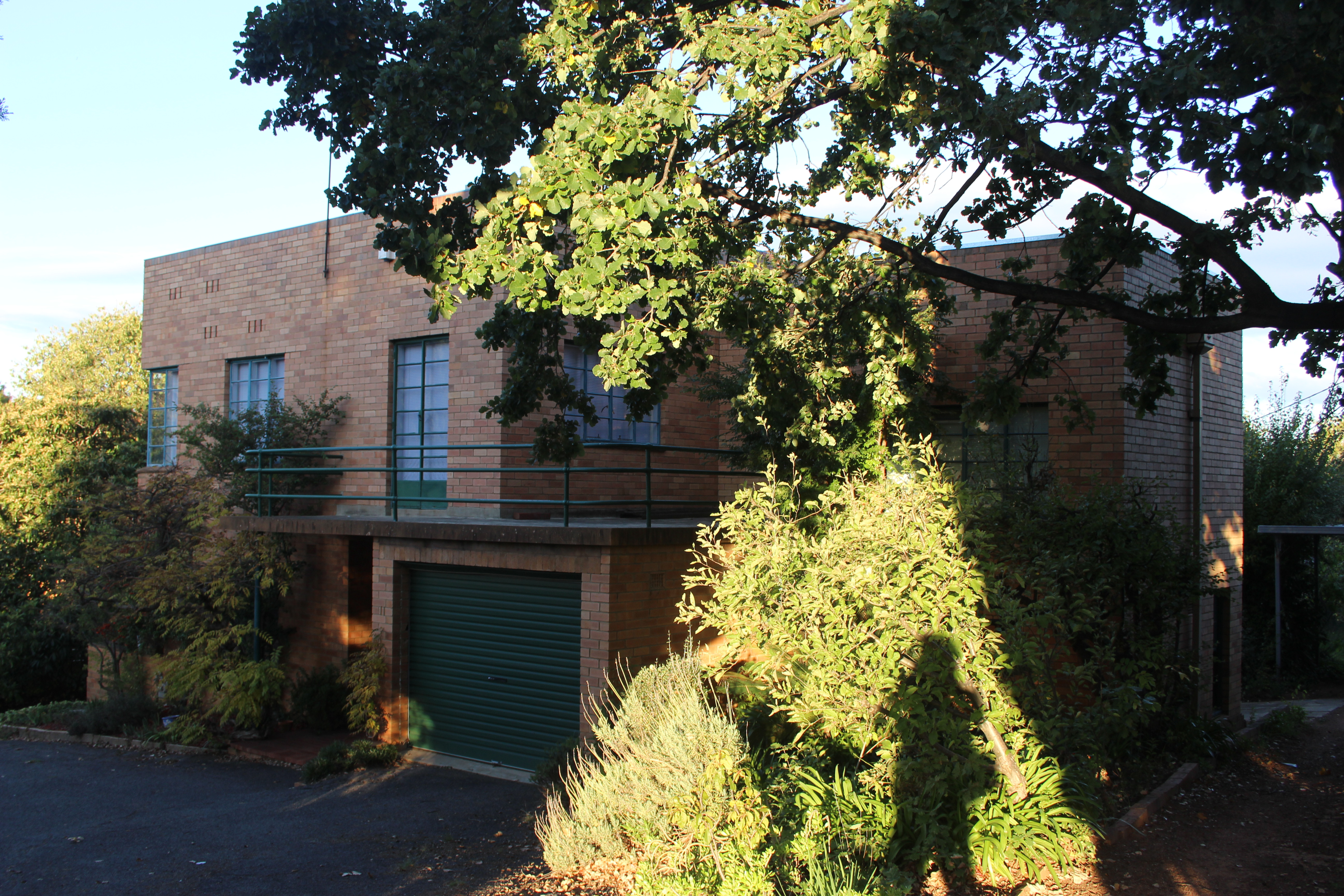
Evans Crescent House

- The Evans Crescent Housing at 7–11 Evans Crescent, which the ACT Heritage Council considers to be an "excellent example of Inter-War Functionalist Style housing which, at the time of its construction in 1940 was relatively new in Australia."
- The Canberra Services Club at 14 Manuka Circle, which the ACT Heritage Council considers to be historically significant for its association with the provision of hospitality to service personnel by Canberra volunteers during World War II. Lady Gowrie, the wife of the Governor General, played a major role in establishing it, including fund-raising. The Services Club burnt down in April 2011, but it has been decided to rebuild it.
- Manuka Swimming Pool on Manuka Circle, which was completed in 1930. The ACT Heritage Council considers it to be "an important component of the body of 'Federal Capital' style public buildings associated with the establishment of Canberra as the National Capital."
- Dairy Farmers Co-Operative complex at the corner of Wentworth Avenue and Mildura Street, which was completed in 1938 and 1952. It is an example of industrial architecture in the Inter-War Functionalist style, designed by Ken Oliphant.
- The Kingston/Griffith Garden City heritage precinct, sections 15, 16 and 17 of Kingston and section 22 of Griffith, bounded by Dawes, Howitt, Cunningham and Kennedy streets, Burke Crescent, Leichhardt and Cunningham streets and Canberra Avenue. The Garden City housing in the precinct is in Kingston and the section in Griffith is a sports ground.
- The former Griffith Child Welfare Centre at 30 Manuka Circle, which was opened in 1937. The Heritage Council considers it to be important as the first permanent baby health centre in the ACT.
- The Manuka Oval and Caretaker’s Cottage, which began to be developed as a sports ground in the early 1920s and began to be developed as a formal enclosed oval in March 1929. The Heritage Council considers that it is "significant for its continual use as a Canberra sporting facility, retaining an array of features such as the historic tree plantings, the oval, the Caretaker's Cottage and the later scoreboard which tell the story of its development as a popular sporting venue."

== Demography ==
At the 2021 census, Griffith had a population of 5,328 people, including 1.3% Indigenous people. The major industry of Griffith's citizens was central government administration and 41.7% of Griffith workers were professionals, 23.0% were managers and 11.6% were clerical and administrative workers. The median Griffith citizen was 38 years old, earning a mean weekly gross personal income of approximately $1,572 per week, compared to the ACT mean of $1,203 and the Australian mean of $805.

66.9% of people were born in Australia. The next most common country of birth was England at 4.2%. 76.6% of people spoke only English at home. The most common responses for religion were No Religion (48.4%) and Catholic (17.8%).

== Politics ==
Griffith is located within the federal electorate of Canberra, which is currently represented by Alicia Payne in the House of Representatives. In the ACT Legislative Assembly, Griffith is part of the electorate of Kurrajong, which elects five members on the basis of proportional representation, currently two Labor, one Green, one Liberal and one Independent.

== Geology ==
Rocks in Griffith are from the Silurian period. Mount Painter Volcanics dark grey to green grey dacitic tuff is found to the south west of the Deakin Fault. Canberra Formation, calcareous shale is in the north east of the Deakin Fault. The Deakin Fault is named after the suburb, and in the suburb it runs from Canberra Avenue at Manuka to Frome Street. The Deakin fault is an important fault running in the north west direction across most of Canberra.

== Education ==
Griffith residents get preference for:

- Depending on the address, Forrest Primary or Red Hill Primary
- Telopea Park School (for high school)
- Narrabundah College

Griffith is home to Canberra's first private Catholic boys school, St Edmund's College, a Christian Brothers school opened in 1954. There are 5 other schools located in the suburb.

The Russian Embassy School in Canberra, a Russian primary school operated by the Ministry of Foreign Affairs of Russia, is located on the grounds of the Embassy of Russia in Canberra in Griffith. It provides a free education to Russian diplomat families and accepts other children on a tuition basis.

== Notable places ==
The Canberra South Bowling Club on the corner of Austin and La Perouse Streets was designed by the architect Harry Seidler and completed in 1959 and demolished in 2014 to make way for high density apartments.
