= Manuka, Australian Capital Territory =

Neighbourhood of Canberra, Australia

Manuka
- Suburb
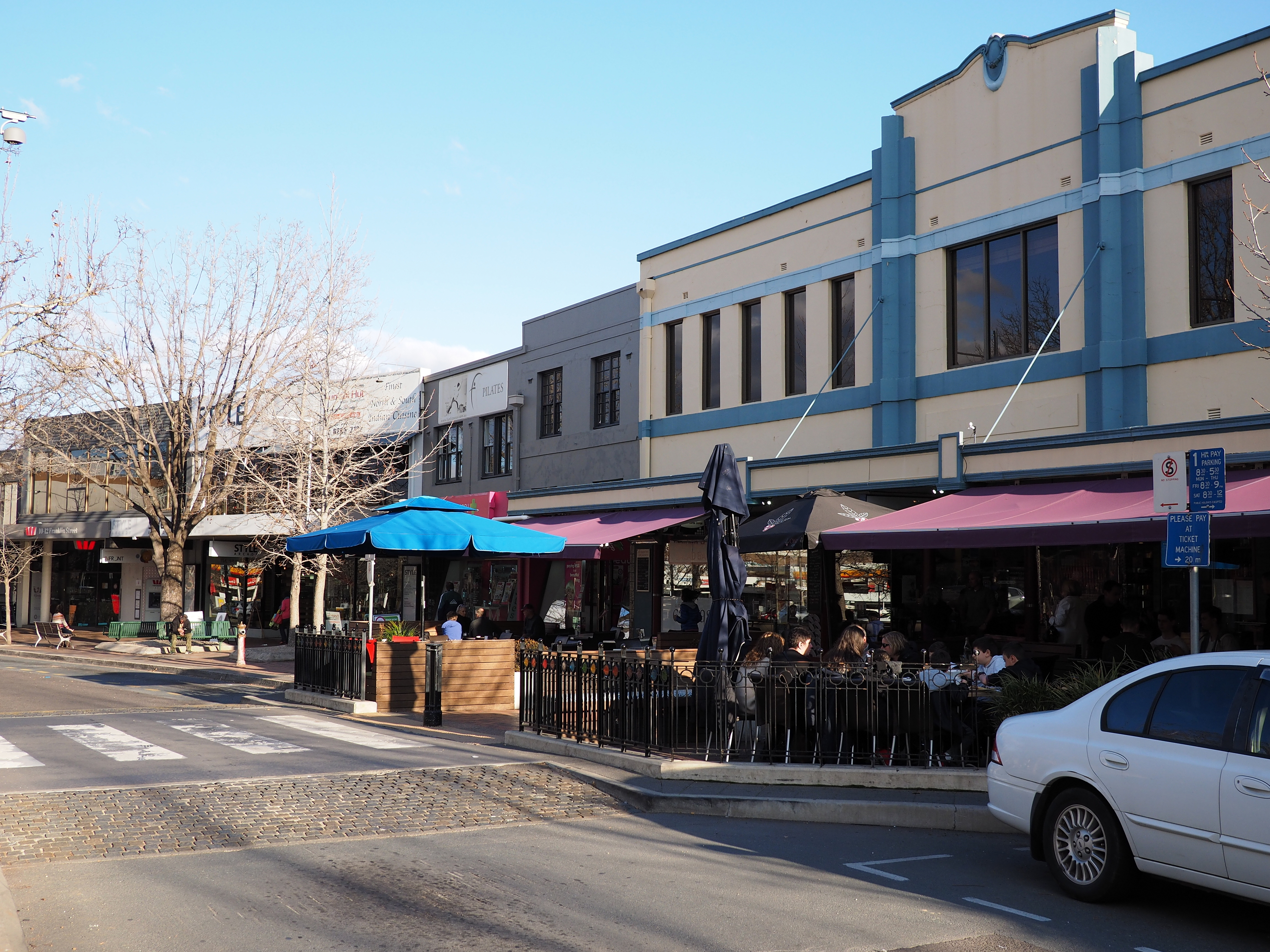
- Franklin Street in Manuka in 2015

- Coordinates: 35°19′12″S 149°07′59″E
- Country: Australia
- State: Australian Capital Territory
- City: Canberra
- District: South Canberra
- Location: 7 km (4.3 mi) S of Canberra CBD; 11 km (6.8 mi) W of Queanbeyan; 98 km (61 mi) SW of Goulburn; 295 km (183 mi) SW of Sydney
- Established: 1927

Government
  - Territory electorate: Kurrajong
  - Federal division: Canberra

Area
  - Total: 2.75 km^{2} (1.06 sq mi)
- Elevation: 580 m (1,900 ft)
- Postcode: 2603
- Gazetted: 20 September 1928
Suburbs around Manuka
Forrest	Barton	Kingston
Red Hill	Manuka	Griffith
Red Hill	Symonston	Narrabundah

Manuka (/ˈmɑːnəkə/ MAH-nə-kə) is an area in the Inner South district of Canberra, Australia, covering parts of the suburbs of Griffith and Forrest. Manuka Shops, Manuka Oval, Manuka Swimming Pool, and Manuka Circle take their name from the park in the area.

== Origin of name ==
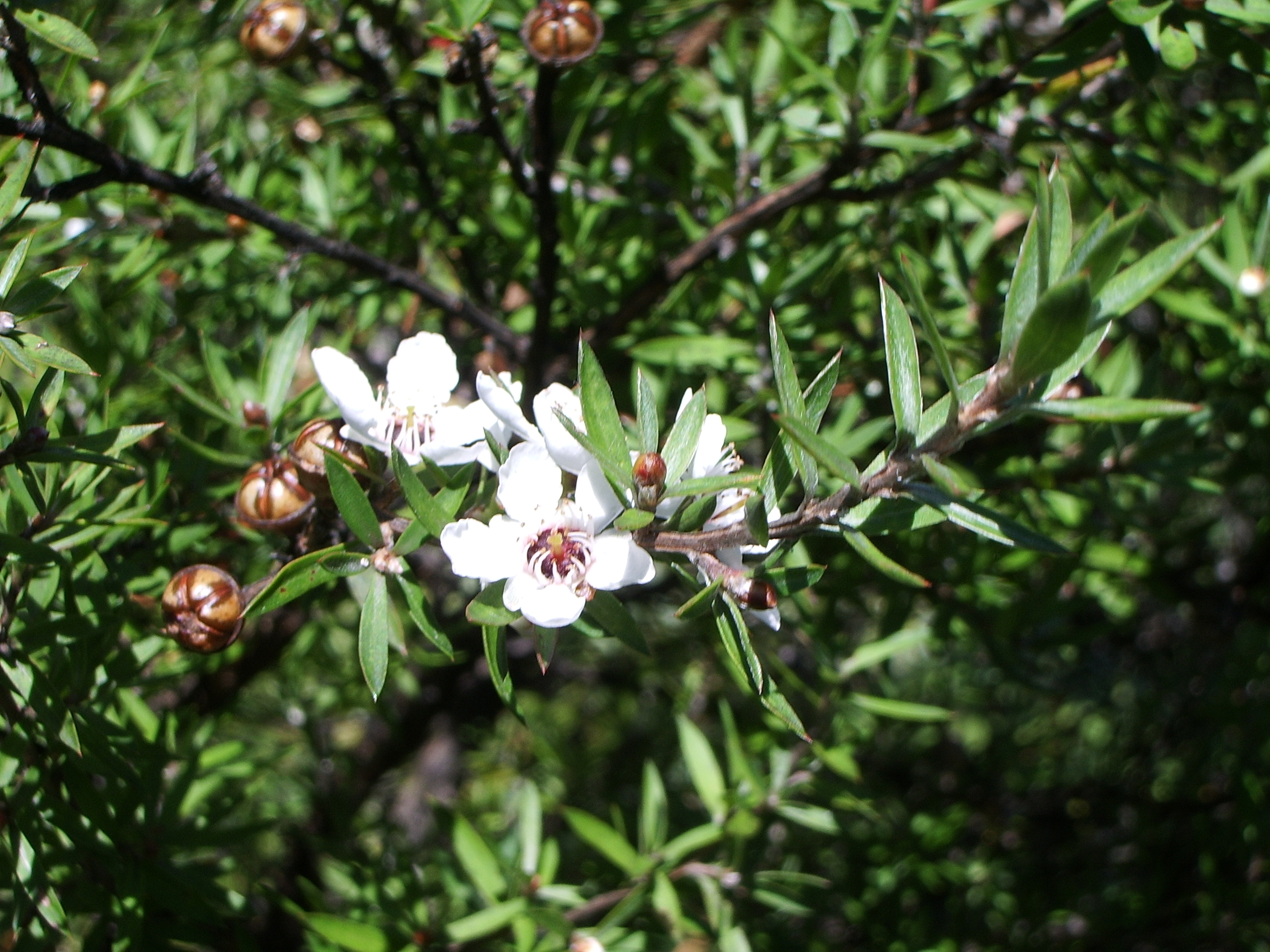
Leptospermum scoparium, the flowers and leaves of the Manuka tea tree

The precinct is named after Manuka Circle, the street which forms the northern boundary of the precinct. Manuka Circle was on Walter Burley Griffin's original plan for Canberra and named after the Leptospermum scoparium, a flowering tree native to New Zealand and south-eastern Australia. The name Manuka is pronounced by most local Canberrans differently from the tree after which both street and suburb are named: /ˈmɑːnəkə/ (compared to /mɑːˈnuːkə/ for the tree). The common name of the tree species comes from the Māori word for it, mānuka, and is sometimes written with the macron included, as mānuka, in New Zealand English.

When Griffin drew up his plans in 1912, there was still some optimism that New Zealand might join the Federation of Australia. Griffin's plans included eight avenues radiating out from Capital Hill named after the capitals of the six states, the capital of the Northern Territory and the capital of New Zealand. Before the name Wellington Avenue was gazetted it was realised that New Zealand was not going to become part of a federation of Australasia and the name was replaced by Canberra Avenue. Griffin planned that the state capital city avenues were terminated with a park named after the generic botanical name for a native plant from that particular site; for example, Telopea Park is named after the waratah, the floral emblem of New South Wales, and is at the end of Sydney Avenue, named after the capital of New South Wales. Another remnant of Griffin's nomenclature was the Wellington Hotel, formerly on the corner of Canberra Avenue and National Circuit which was demolished in 1984 and replaced by the hotel known in 2005 as "Rydges Capital Hill Canberra".

== History ==
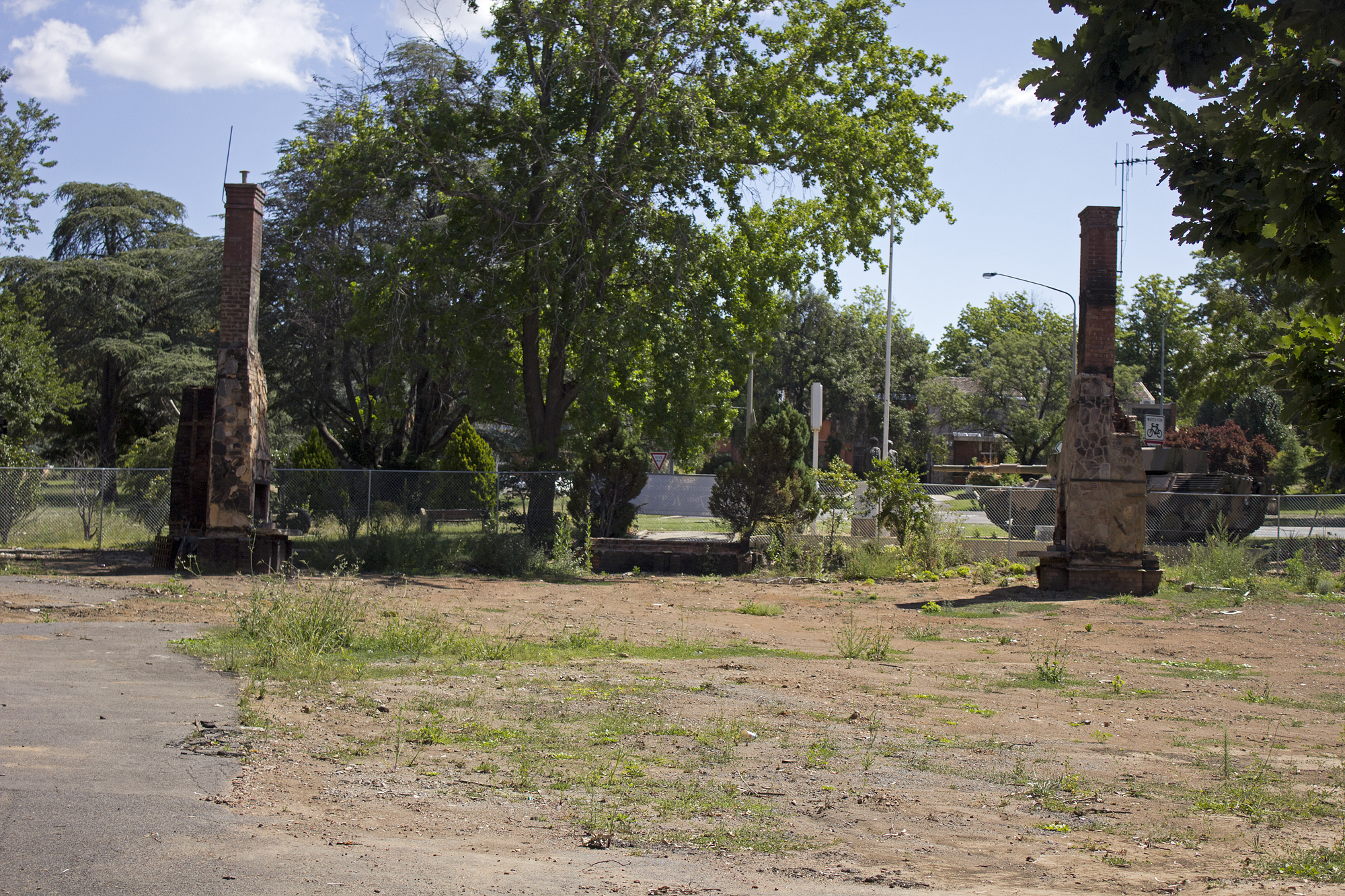
Ruins of the Canberra Services Club

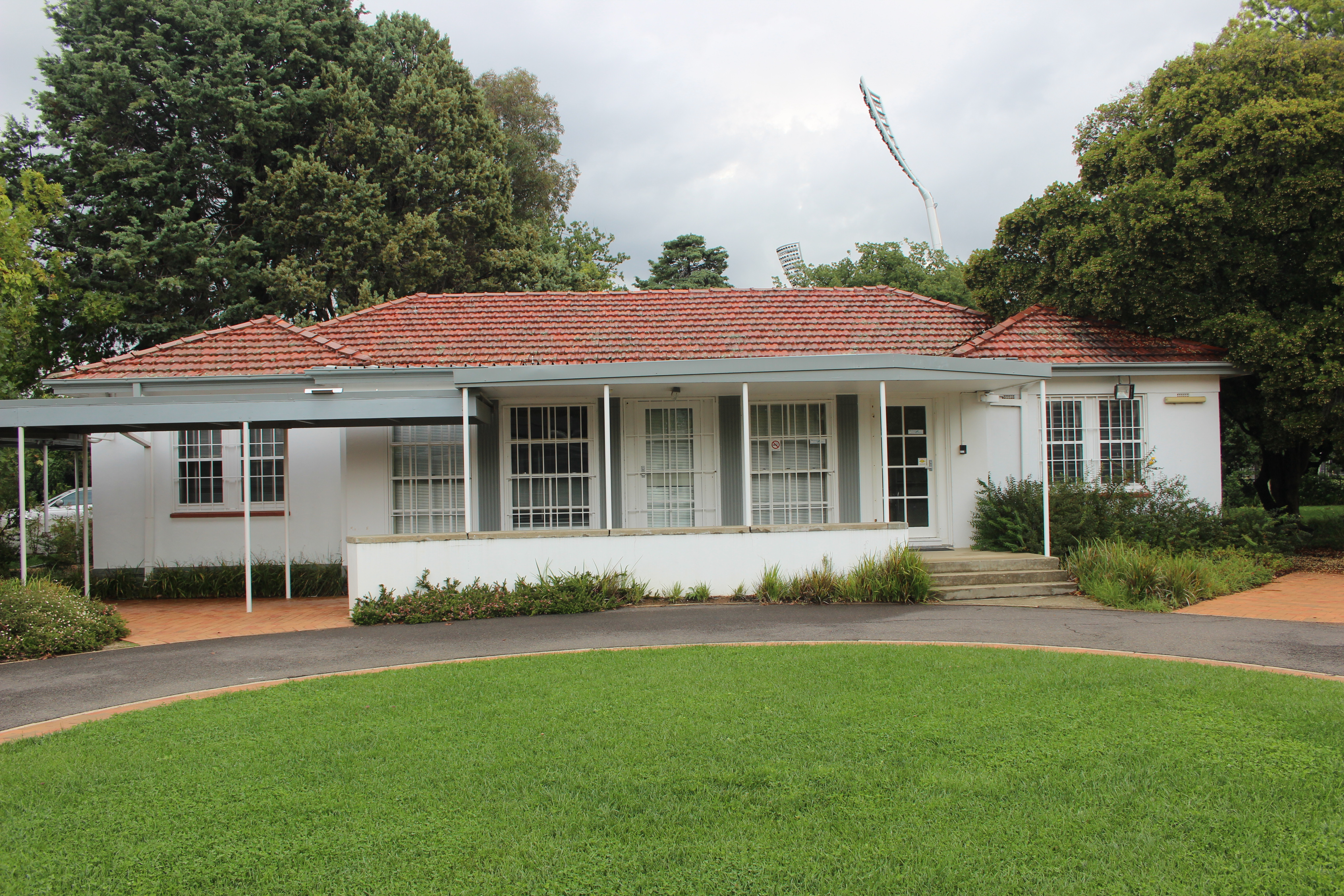
Former Griffith Child Welfare Centre

Business allotments for Manuka were included in the first auction of city leases in December 1924. At the same time leases were sold in the city, Braddon, Kingston, Forrest and Red Hill. Lessees were required to erect buildings of approved design on the blocks within three years. The decision to develop business centres at both Kingston (then called Eastlake) and Manuka, which were within one-half mile (800 m) of each other had been made in the absence of Sir John Sulman, the chair of the Federal Capital Advisory Committee. He later recorded his disapproval of the decision. Sulman had designed Manuka and it was intended to be the principal commercial centre on the south side.

The decision to allow the development of Eastlake meant that in Manuka investment lagged and building was slow. Eastlake was preferred by residents as a business centre because of the bigger shops and closer proximity to more homes, as well as being closer to the previously only substantial shop in the Territory, which was near Canberra railway station. The opening of the Capitol Theatre, and the convent school associated with St Christopher's Catholic Cathedral, allowed the Manuka businesses to develop competitively.

Manuka includes several areas that are listed by the ACT Heritage Council:

- St Christopher's Cathedral Precinct, which has been the centre of Catholic worship and education in the Archdiocese of Canberra and Goulburn since 1928.
- St Paul’s Church on the corner of Canberra Avenue and Captain Cook Crescent, which the Heritage Council considers to be an excellent example of an Inter-War Gothic church with Art Deco influences. The church was designed by Sydney Architects Burcham Clamp and Son and dedicated on 6 August 1939.
- The Manuka Oval and Caretaker’s Cottage, which began to be developed as a sports ground in the early 1920s and began to be developed as a formal enclosed oval in March 1929. The Heritage Council considers that it is "significant for its continual use as a Canberra sporting facility, retaining an array of features such as the historic tree plantings, the oval, the Caretaker's Cottage and the later scoreboard which tell the story of its development as a popular sporting venue."
- Manuka Swimming Pool on Manuka Circle, which was completed in 1930. The ACT Heritage Council considers it to be "an important component of the body of 'Federal Capital' style public buildings associated with the establishment of Canberra as the National Capital".
- The Canberra Services Club at 14 Manuka Circle, which the ACT Heritage Council considers to be historically significant for its association with the provision of hospitality to service personnel by Canberra volunteers during World War II. Lady Gowrie, the wife of the Governor General, played a major role in establishing it, including fund-raising. The Services Club burnt down in April 2011, but it has been decided to rebuild it.
- The former Griffith Child Health and Welfare Centre at 30 Manuka Circle, which was opened in 1937. The Heritage Council considers it to be important as the first permanent baby health centre in the ACT. The site has since been home to various arts organisations, including the original Canberra School of Music. It is currently home to community radio station ArtSound FM, and photography centre Photo Access.

== Facilities ==
=== Shops ===
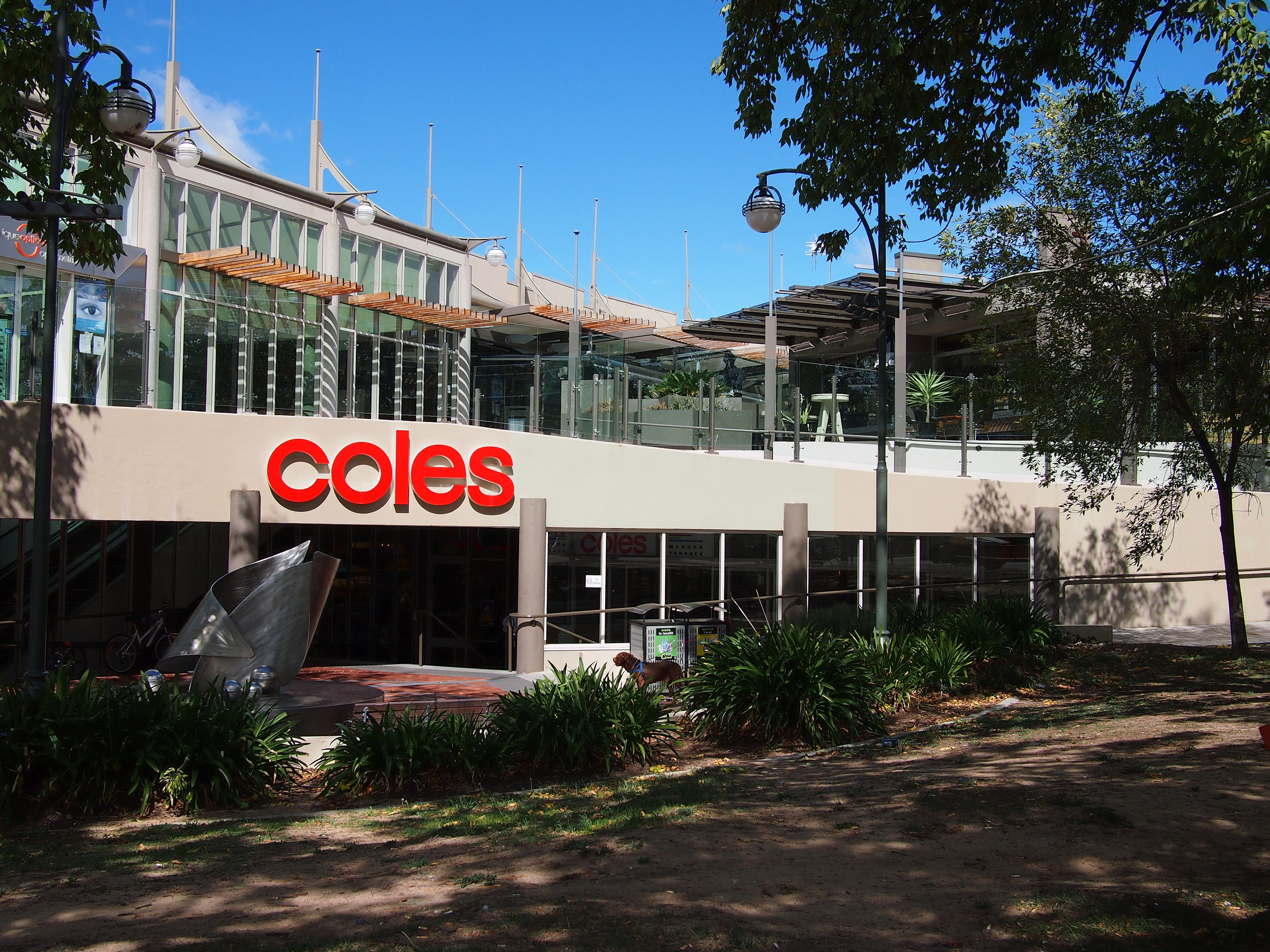
Manuka Terrace

Shops were first built in Manuka between 1925 and 1930. In recent years a collection of outdoor cafes has taken over the more utilitarian shops that dominated the area up to the late 1970s. In the 1960s the precinct included a hardware shop, two supermarkets, a large delicatessen, two butchers, a fishmongers, at least one green grocer, several florists, a boot shop and repairer, clothes shops, home wares and furniture shops, several shoe shops, chemists, newsagents, several barbers and hairdressers and a shop selling church candles. Manuka is now known for its restaurants and for some nightclubs.

=== Manuka Pool ===
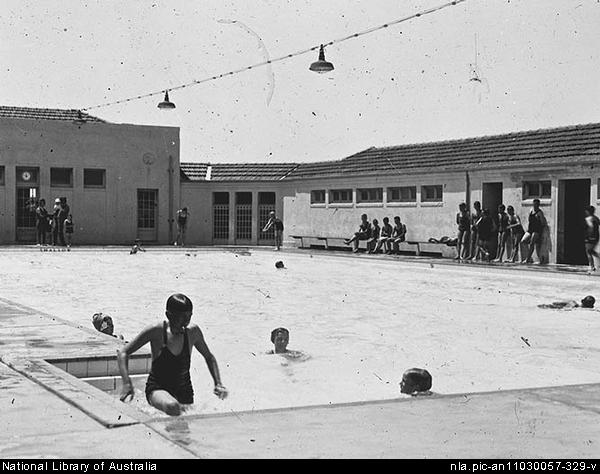
Interior of Manuka Pool photographed by William James Mildenhall about the 1930s

Building work commenced on the pool in July 1930. It was the first swimming pool to be built for the city. Before its completion, Canberrans swam in the Molonglo River and other local swimming holes at the Cotter and Murrumbidgee Rivers. Canberra's first pool was built on the south side as it was closer to more Canberra residents than any northside location. The pool was officially opened on 26 January 1931.

=== Manuka Oval ===
Manuka Oval has a seating capacity of 13,550 people and an overall capacity of 16,000 people, although this is lower for some sports depending on the configuration used. The area on which the ground is situated has been used for sport since the early 20th century, but was only enclosed in 1929. It has undergone several redevelopments, most recently beginning in 2011.

=== St Christopher's Cathedral ===
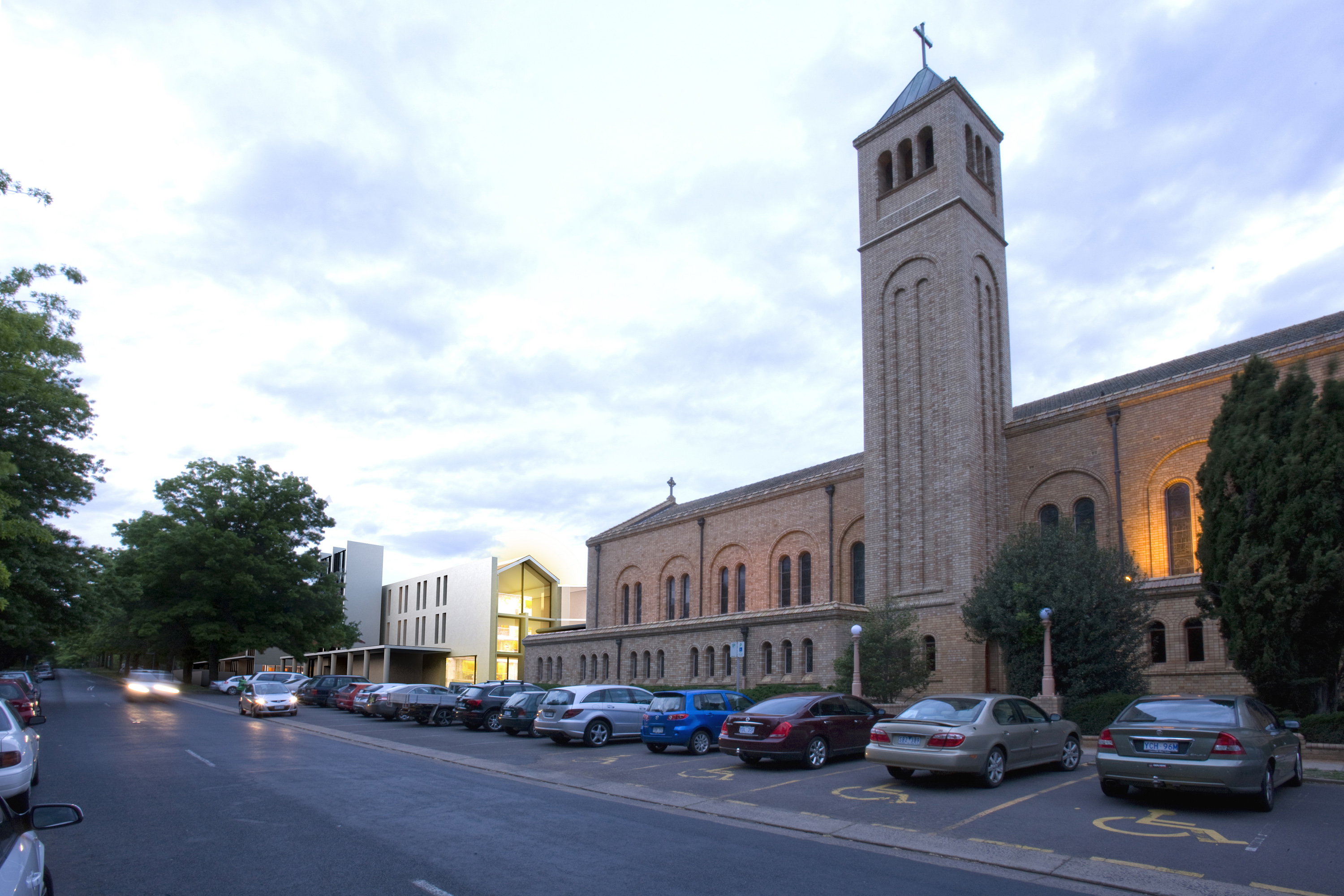
St Christopher's Cathedral

St Christopher's Cathedral is adjacent to the shopping district, and is technically located in the suburb of Forrest. The first stage of St Christopher's Cathedral which was completed in 1939. St Christopher's was finally extended to its present size in 1973, when it became the co-cathedral of the Catholic Archdiocese of Canberra and Goulburn, and more recently the sole cathedral when the former cathedral in Goulburn ceased to be a cathedral of the archdiocese. It was listed by the ACT Heritage Council in 1998.

=== St Paul's Church ===
Founded in 1939 it part of the Anglican Diocese of Canberra and Goulburn. It is listed in the ACT Heritage Register as an "...excellent example of an Inter-War Gothic church with Art Deco influences". It was the first place in Australia to install a combination organ and has one of a small number of rings of bells in the Australian Capital Territory. It is situated on the corner of Canberra Avenue and Captain Cook Crescent, opposite Manuka Oval.

=== Capitol Theatre ===
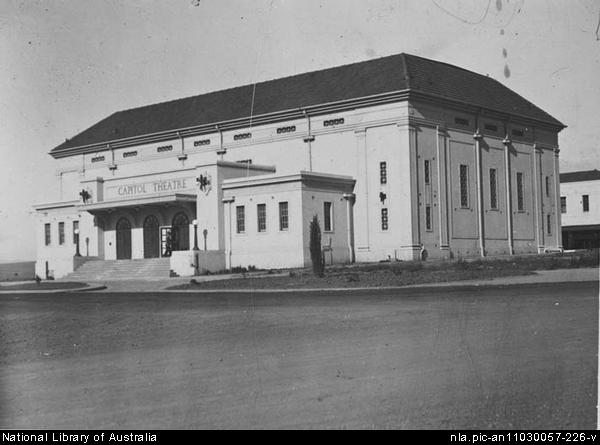
The original Capitol Theatre about 1928 photographed by W. J. Mildenhall

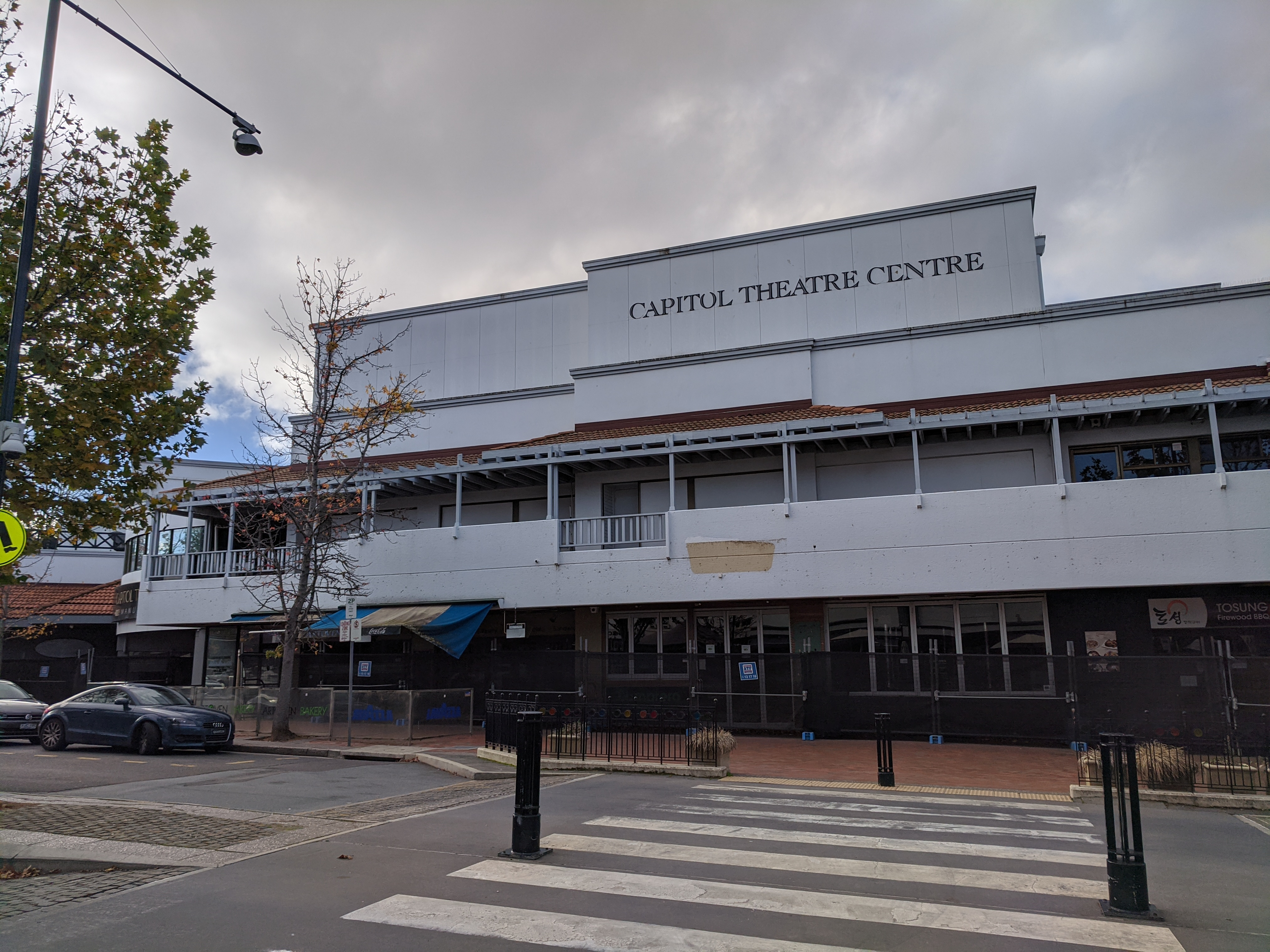
The second Capitol Theatre in 2020

The Capitol Theatre was one of Canberra's most important centres for entertainment in the early life of the city, with many plays and films. The design was to the requirements of the theatre impresario J. C. Williamson. It was opened in 1927 and hosted a reception for the arrival of aviator Bert Hinkler in Canberra in 1928. The theatre was later bulldozed in 1980 and a new cinema was built on the site. The decision to destroy such an important building of Canberra's heritage was controversial at the time and since. The second cinema space was eventually decommissioned in 2020, and the building was demolished between 2023 and 2024 to make way for a new hotel.
