= Kingston, Australian Capital Territory =

Suburb of Canberra, Australia

Kingston
- Suburb
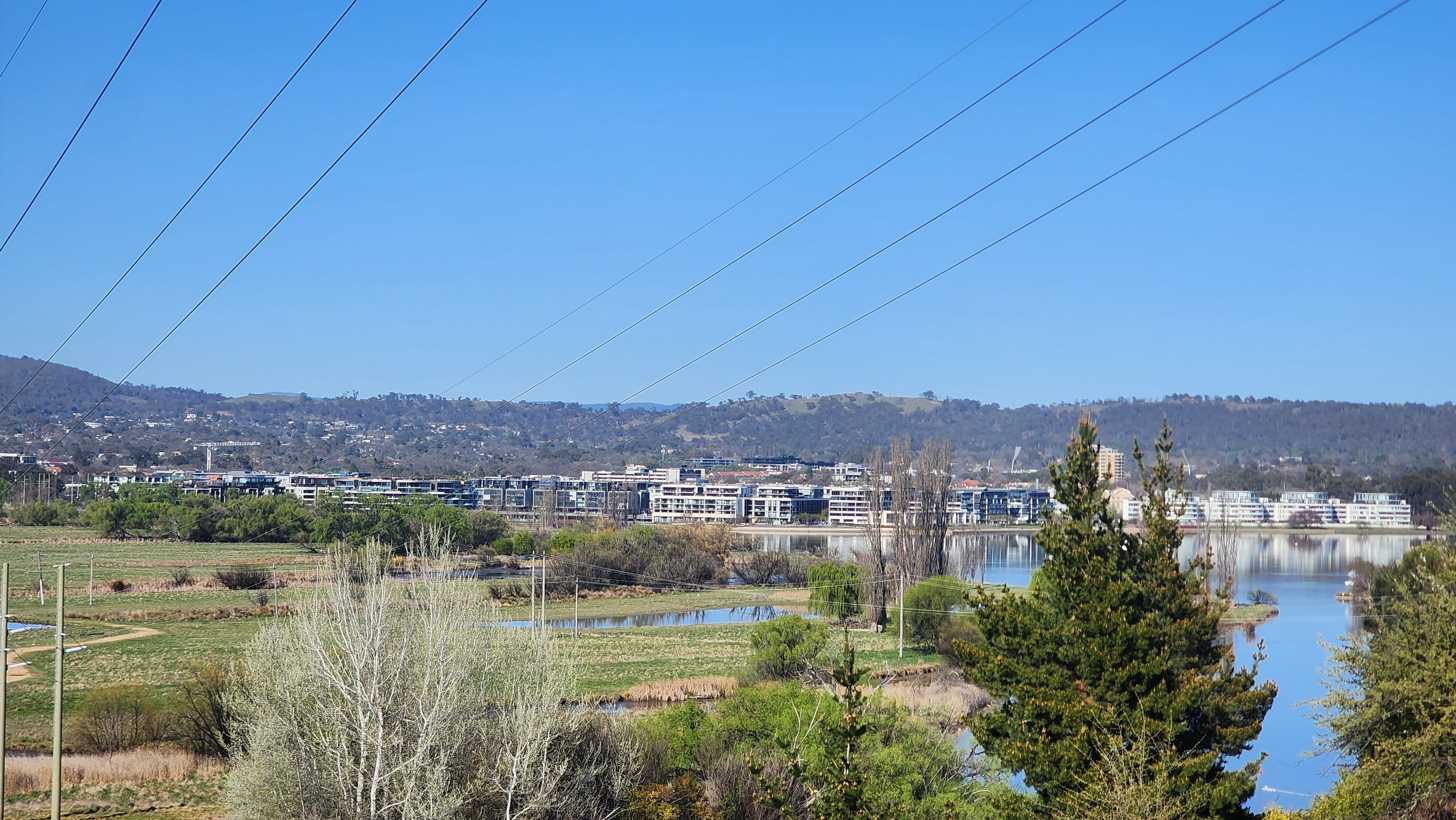
- View from Mount Pleasant

- Coordinates: 35°18′56″S 149°08′39″E
- Country: Australia
- State: Australian Capital Territory
- City: Canberra
- District: South Canberra
- Location: 7 km (4.3 mi) SSE of Canberra CBD; 11 km (6.8 mi) WNW of Queanbeyan; 96 km (60 mi) SW of Goulburn; 293 km (182 mi) SW of Sydney
- Established: 1922

Government
  - Territory electorate: Kurrajong
  - Federal division: Canberra

Area
  - Total: 1.31 km^{2} (0.51 sq mi)
- Elevation: 563 m (1,847 ft)

Population
  - Total: 6,579 (2021 census)
  - Density: 5,022/km^{2} (13,010/sq mi)
- Postcode: 2604
- Gazetted: 20 September 1928
Suburbs around Kingston
Barton	Lake Burley Griffin	Fyshwick
Barton	Kingston	Fyshwick
Manuka	Griffith	Fyshwick

Kingston is the oldest and one of the most densely populated suburbs of Canberra, Australian Capital Territory, Australia. The suburb is named after Charles Cameron Kingston, the former Premier of South Australia and minister in the first Australian Commonwealth Government. It is adjacent to the suburbs of Barton, Fyshwick, Griffith and Manuka. The suburb of Kingston is situated about 4 km from the centre of Canberra.

== History ==
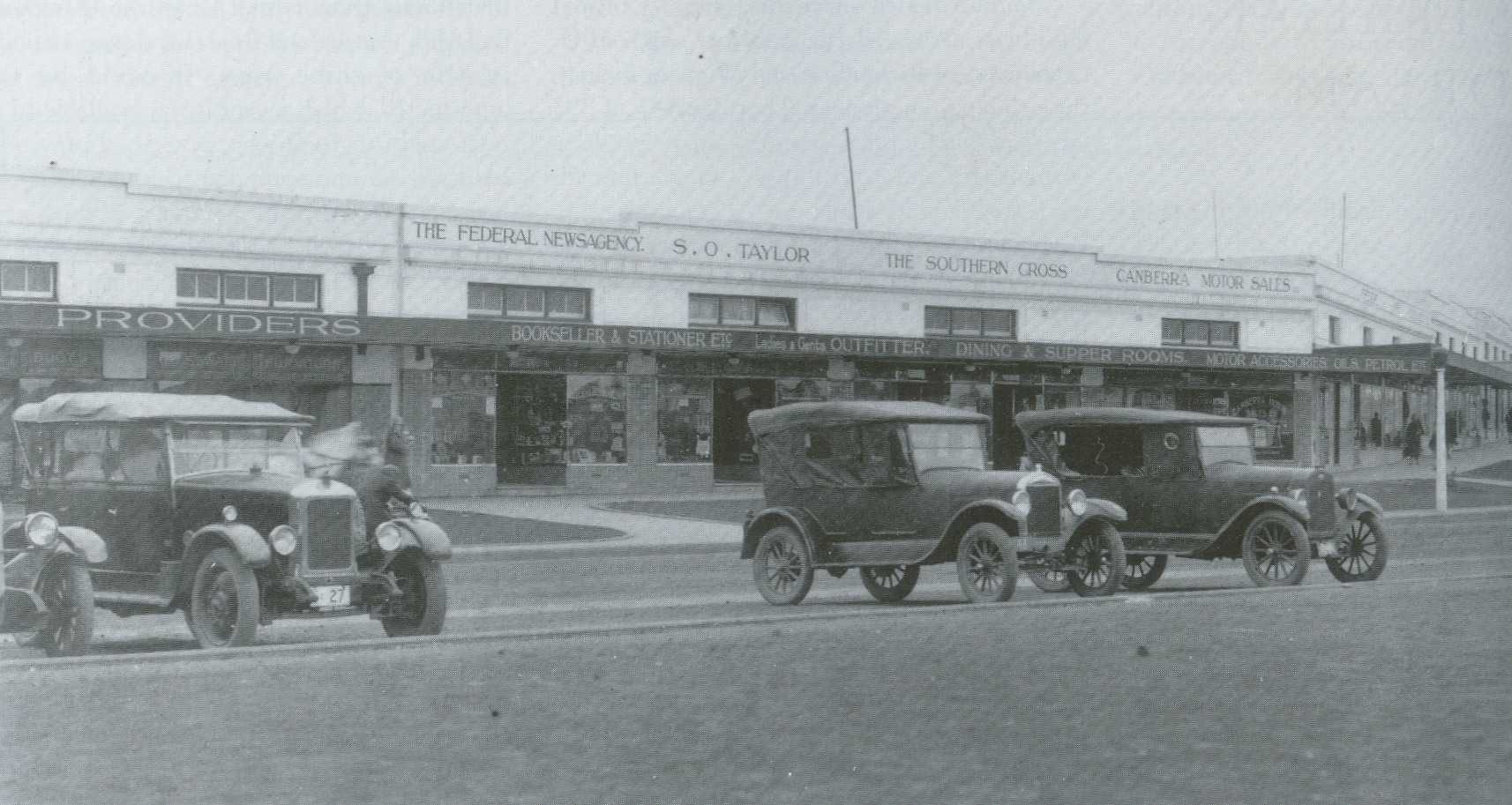
Eastlake, 1928

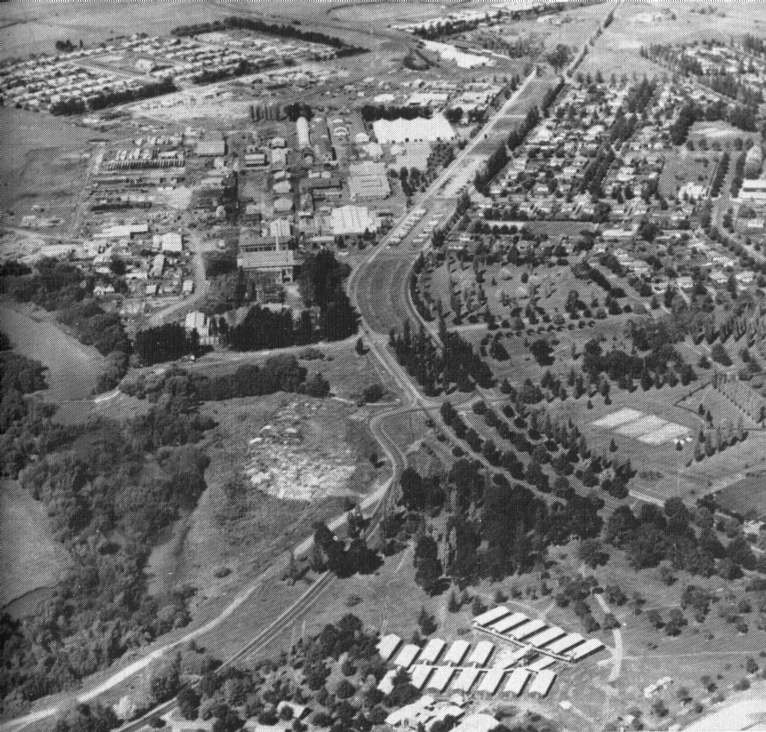
Kingston industrial area 1950s

In the early years of Canberra's development, Eastlake occupied the area now known as Kingston. Eastlake Football and Cricket club is one of the few reminders of Kingston long past. Eastlake was designated as a workers living quarters while the suburb of Forrest was reserved for middle and higher ranking public servants. About 120 portable wooden cottages for construction workers were built at the Causeway in 1925 and 1926. Canberra's first hall for community gatherings and entertainment was at the Causeway where the recreation hall was completed in 1926 with voluntary labour using materials provided by the Federal Capital Commission. After the second world war, housing at the Causeway and Westlake was considered sub-standard. Although all of the original Westlake cottage have been demolished, the Causeway survives with the original temporary wooden cottages now replaced with brick veneer cottages. As it was separated from the rest of the suburb by Wentworth Avenue and was situated to the north of the railway station the Causeway was a distinct district within the suburb of Kingston, however, it is now abutted by the new Kingston foreshore development.

The Causeway is on the edge of a road called the Causeway, which was planned as a dam across the Molonglo River that would back up East Lake, which was planned by Walter Burley Griffin but never built. The cottages at Causeway were designed by HM Rolland and were first erected at Westlake in 1924, then Acton and finally at the Causeway in 1925–1926. The Westlake cottages were sold off from the mid-1950s – last cottage removed in 1965. A number are now in Queanbeyan and down the South Coast. One also sits with a new coat of paint, in River Street, Oaks Estate. A photograph showing one of the cottages on the move is in Westlake One of the Vanished Suburbs of Canberra – Gugler, A. The timber cottages at the Causeway were pulled down. The cottage design, referred to as portable timber cottages, designed by Rolland were based on the cottages erected at Westlake (present site, Block 3, Section 128 Stirling Park, Yarralumla) by Contractor John Howie for his married men – built 1922. He also built nearby 18 or more timber huts for his single men, known as the Hostel Camp. The Burns Club was founded there in 1924.

=== Heritage listed areas ===
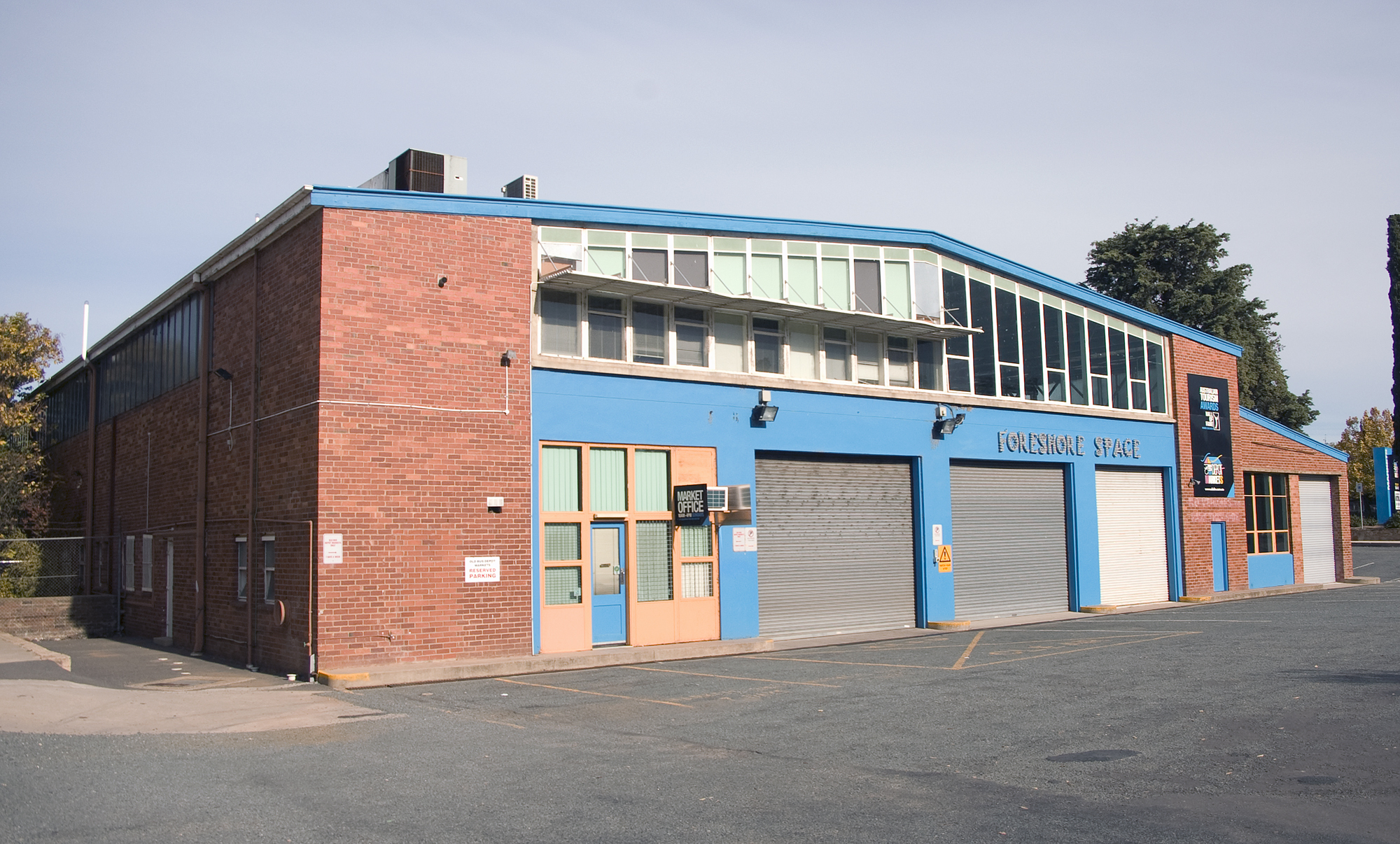
Former ACTION bus depot

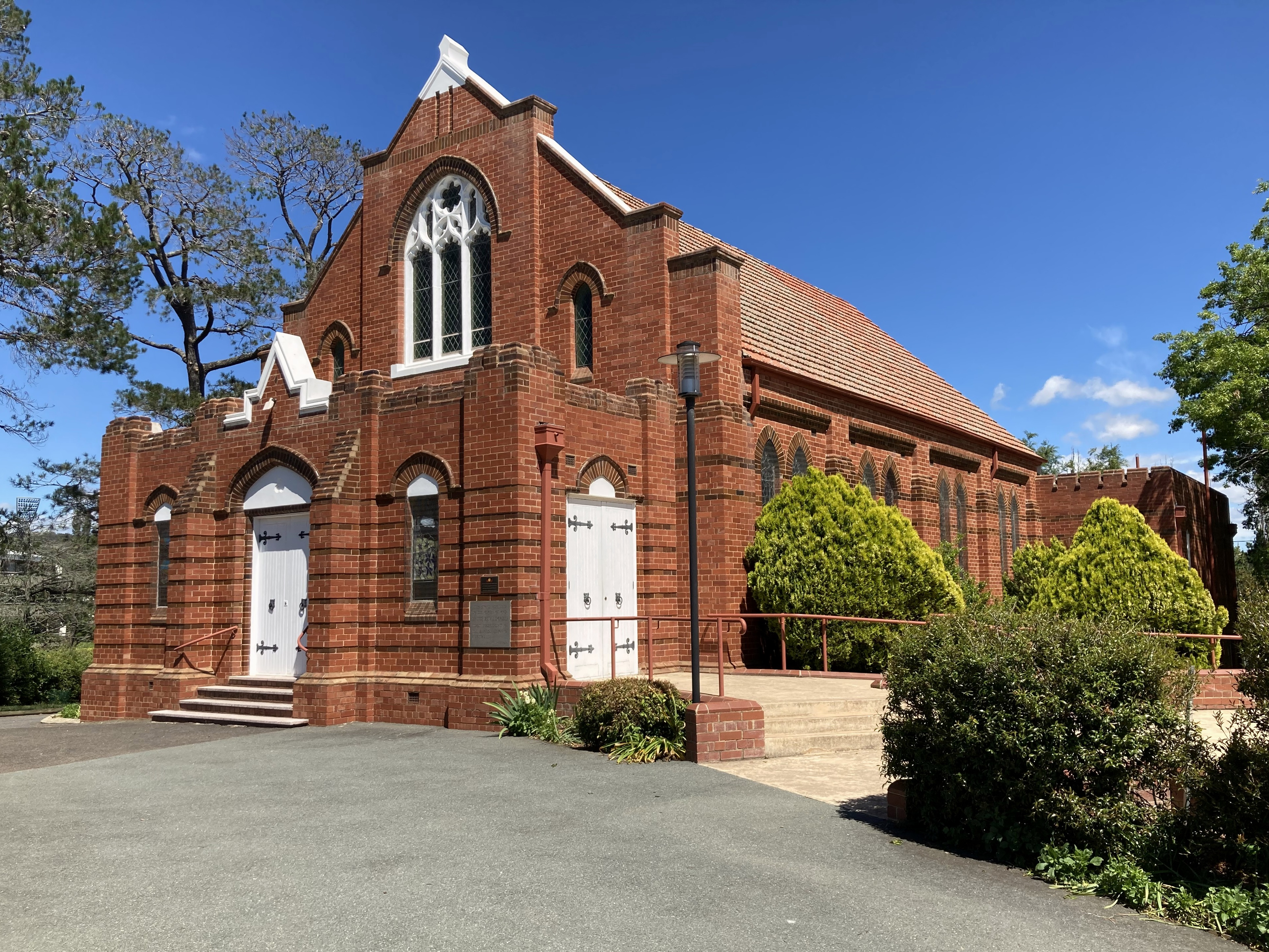
Canberra Baptist Church

The following areas are heritage listed:

- The Kingston/Griffith Garden City heritage precinct, sections 15, 16 and 17 of Kingston and section 22 of Griffith, bounded by Dawes, Howitt, Cunningham and Kennedy streets, Burke Crescent, Leichhardt and Cunningham streets and Canberra Avenue. The first stage of the precinct was constructed in 1926 and 1927 to accommodate lower rank public servants and workmen for the opening of the provisional Parliament House in 1927. The listed area is the only part of the original East Lake precinct that has not been redeveloped.
- The Kingston Powerhouse Historic Precinct. The powerhouse was built in 1915 and was the first permanent public building in Canberra. It was closed in 1929, but reactivated for periods between 1936 and 1942 and between 1948 and 1957. The Fitters' Workshop, the second permanent public building, is also in the precinct. The siren and whistle, which signalled times to Government outdoor workers in south Canberra for many years, is included in the listing.
- Some Arizona and Himalayan cypresses near the original government printing works completed in 1927 east of Wentworth Avenue and north of Giles Street.
- The former ACTION bus depot, which was the centre of government transport operations in Canberra from 1927 to 1992 and is particularly notable for the steel fully welded rigid portal frame that was built to support its roof in 1940 and is considered to be one of the earliest examples of this technology in the world of its size. The building has housed The Old Bus Depot Markets since 14 February 1998. A 1940s built building demolished in 2000, and a 1972 built building in 2001.
- The Causeway Hall, which was built by voluntary labour in 1925 and served for some time as the city's principal place of entertainment, including as "a picture theatre, dance hall and the venue for other entertainment such as concerts and boxing matches".
- The Canberra Baptist Church, 11 Currie Crescent, Kingston, constructed from 21 March 1928 and dedicated on 24 February 1929. It was the second permanent church built after the founding of Canberra and is considered by the ACT Heritage Council to be "a fine example of the Inter-War Gothic style and its internal and external integrity add to this significance."

== Current development ==
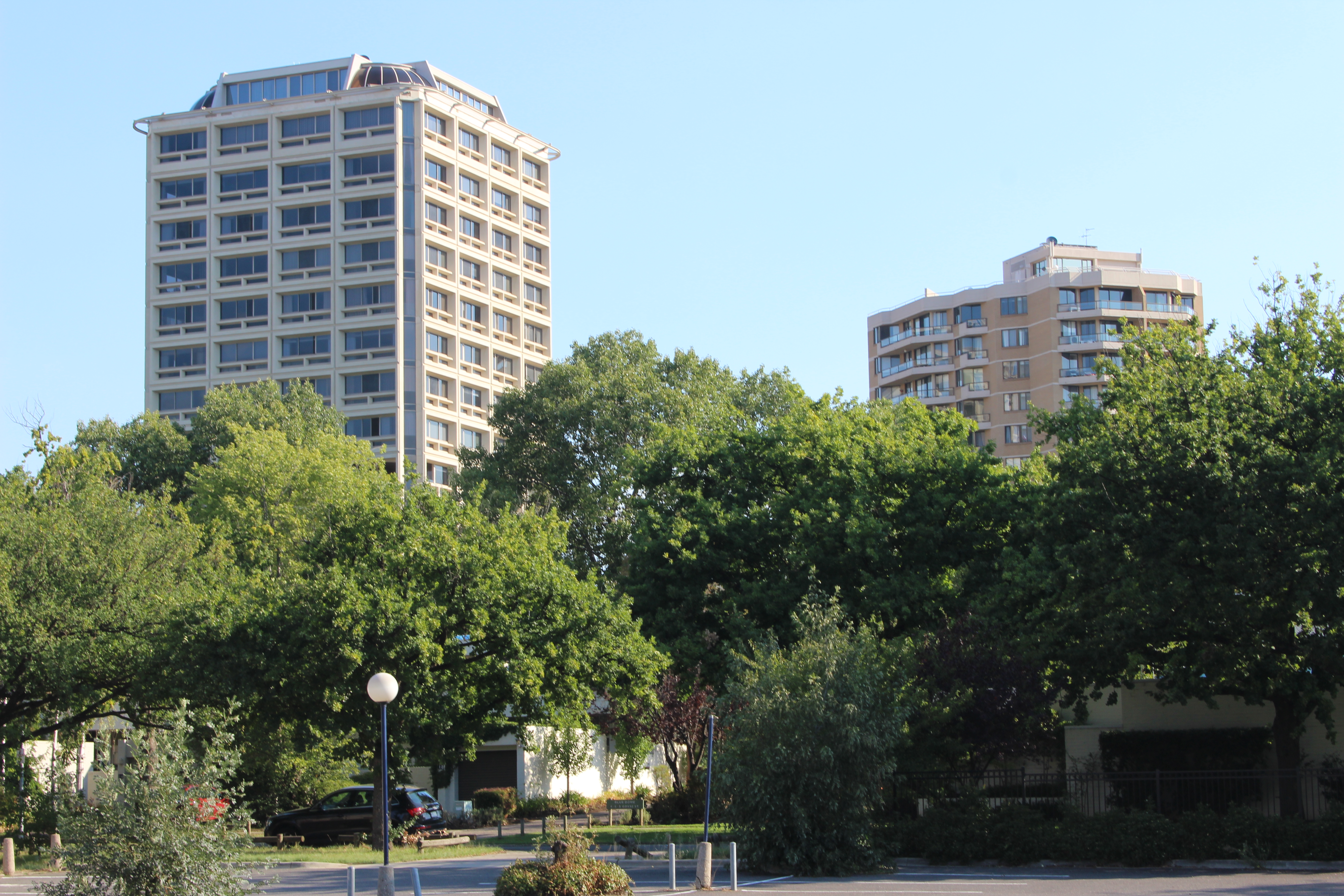
High-rise flats in Kingston

In recent years Kingston has been largely redeveloped with medium-density housing including townhouses and units. Most of Kingston south of Wentworth Avenue is zoned for a predominant height of "3 storeys, with a maximum height of 4 storeys only where it is not the dominant feature of a street frontage", although there are two high-rise blocks north of the shopping centre and the detached houses in three city blocks in the south have heritage protection.

The most recent development is the Kingston Foreshores development in which large numbers of high-value apartments are being built along the foreshores of Lake Burley Griffin. The area had previously been used for industrial purposes and is located between the Canberra railway station and the Kingston Powerhouse. These new developments and the rise of a café society have reformed Kingston as one of the most exclusive suburbs in Canberra. The Kingston Foreshores are zoned for four-story units, but six-storey units are permitted under some conditions in some areas.

Parts of the Kingston Group Centre are now zoned to be redeveloped to a height of 4 storeys (including next to Highgate Lane, which is currently a back alley) and 6 storeys (part of the parking area to the southeast and the site of the former Cusack furniture store).

== Suburb amenities ==
Kingston contains the Kingston Shopping Centre, one of the earliest shopping areas built in Canberra. The northeastern corner of the shopping centre is built around a small park called Green Square. During recent drought years and water restrictions the exotic grass died and were replaced by native grasses that were more drought resistant, but more spiky, discouraging families with children. After a long campaign by local businesses, the exotic grass was reinstituted in early 2014. Kingston is also noted for a lively nightlife and bar scene.

Other places of note in Kingston include the Kingston Powerhouse opened in 1915 and the Canberra railway station. The Old Bus Depot Markets, showing handcrafted goods and foodstuffs, are held on the lakeside every Sunday and have become a regular destination for locals and tourists. Kingston's streets are named after Australia's early European explorers.

== Demographics ==
At the 2021 census, the population of Kingston was 6,579, including 99 (1.5%) Indigenous persons and 2,967 (66.3%) Australian-born persons. 3.0% of dwellings were separate houses (compared to the Australian average of 72.3%), while 6.4% were semi-detached, row or terrace houses (Australian average: 12.6%) and 90.5% were flats, units or apartments (Australian average: 14.2%). 45.0% of the population were professionals, compared to the Australian average of 24.0%. Notably 25.5% worked in central government administration, compared to the Australian average of 1.1% and the ACT-wide average of 17.1%. 51.8% of the population had no religion, compared to the ACT average of 43.5% and the Australian average of 38.4%.

== Major Roads ==
The major road in Kingston is Wentworth Avenue which carries traffic through the suburb from the northwest to the southeast. Telopea Park East forms the northwest boundary of Kingston. Access to the shopping precinct is via Eyre Street or Giles Street.

== Education ==
Kingston residents get preference for:

- A shared Priority Enrollment Area (PEA) of Forrest Primary and Red Hill Primary
- Telopea Park School (for primary and high school)
- Narrabundah College

== Gallery ==
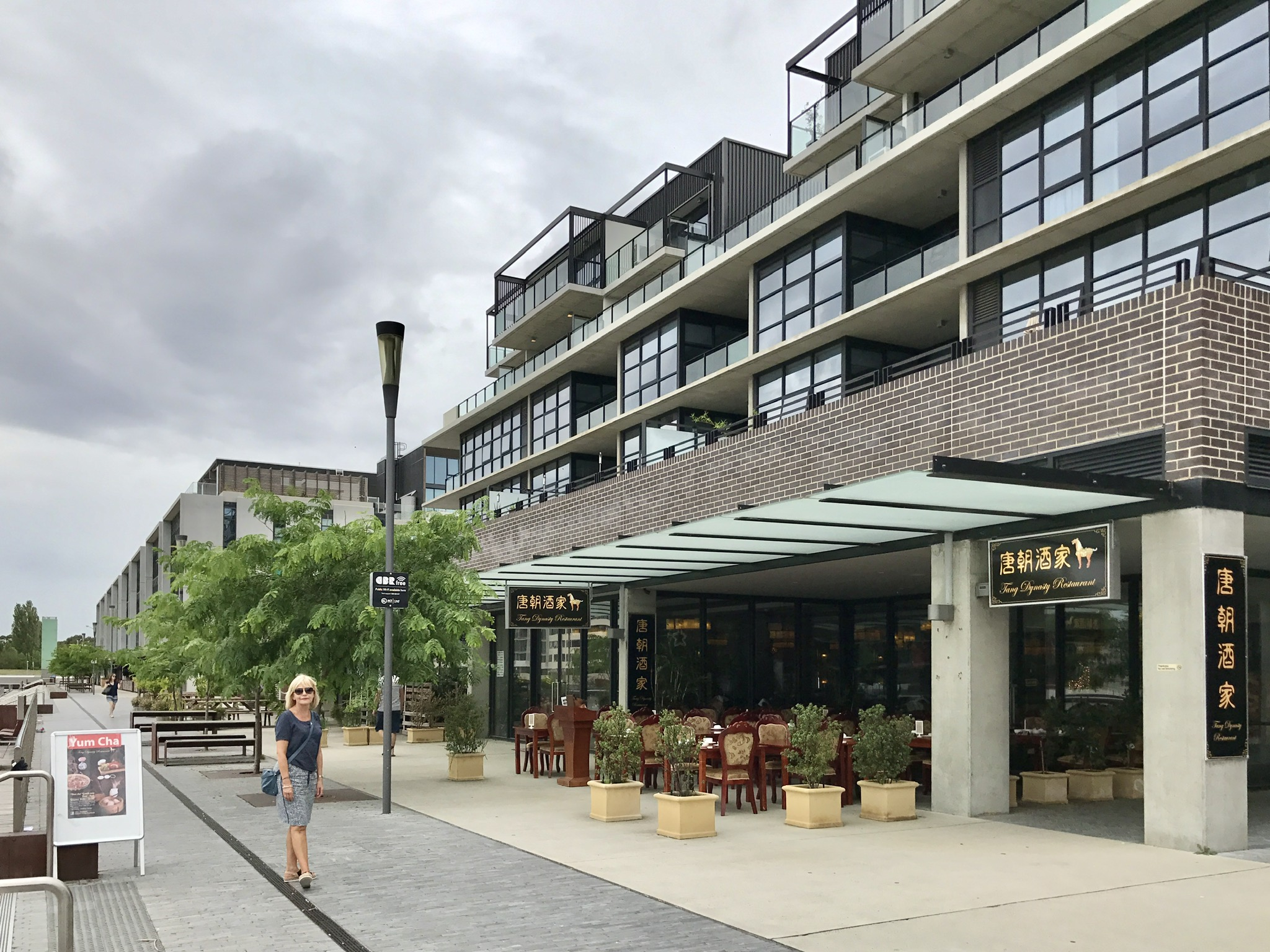
Restaurants at Kingston Foreshore

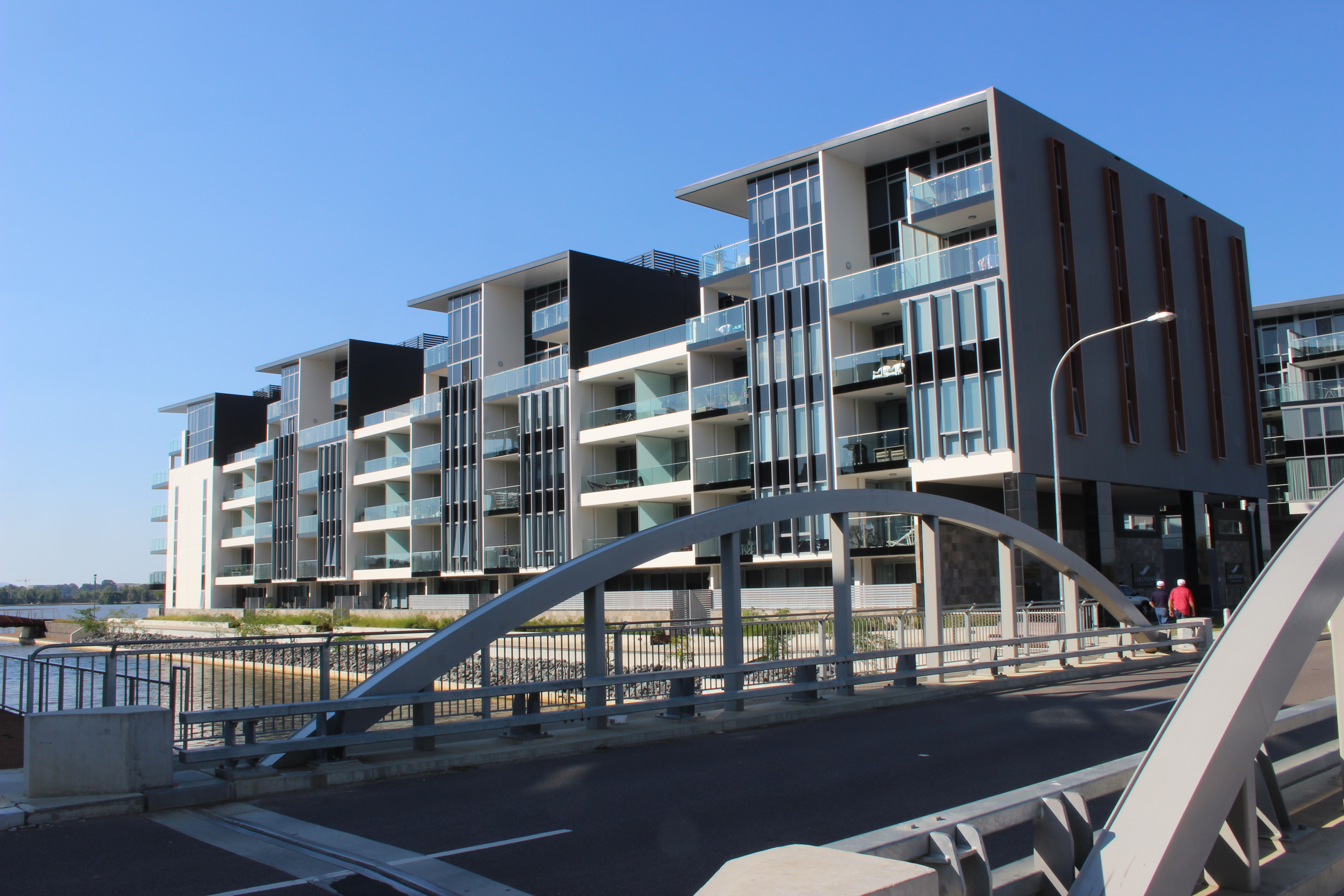
Apartments at Kingston Foreshore

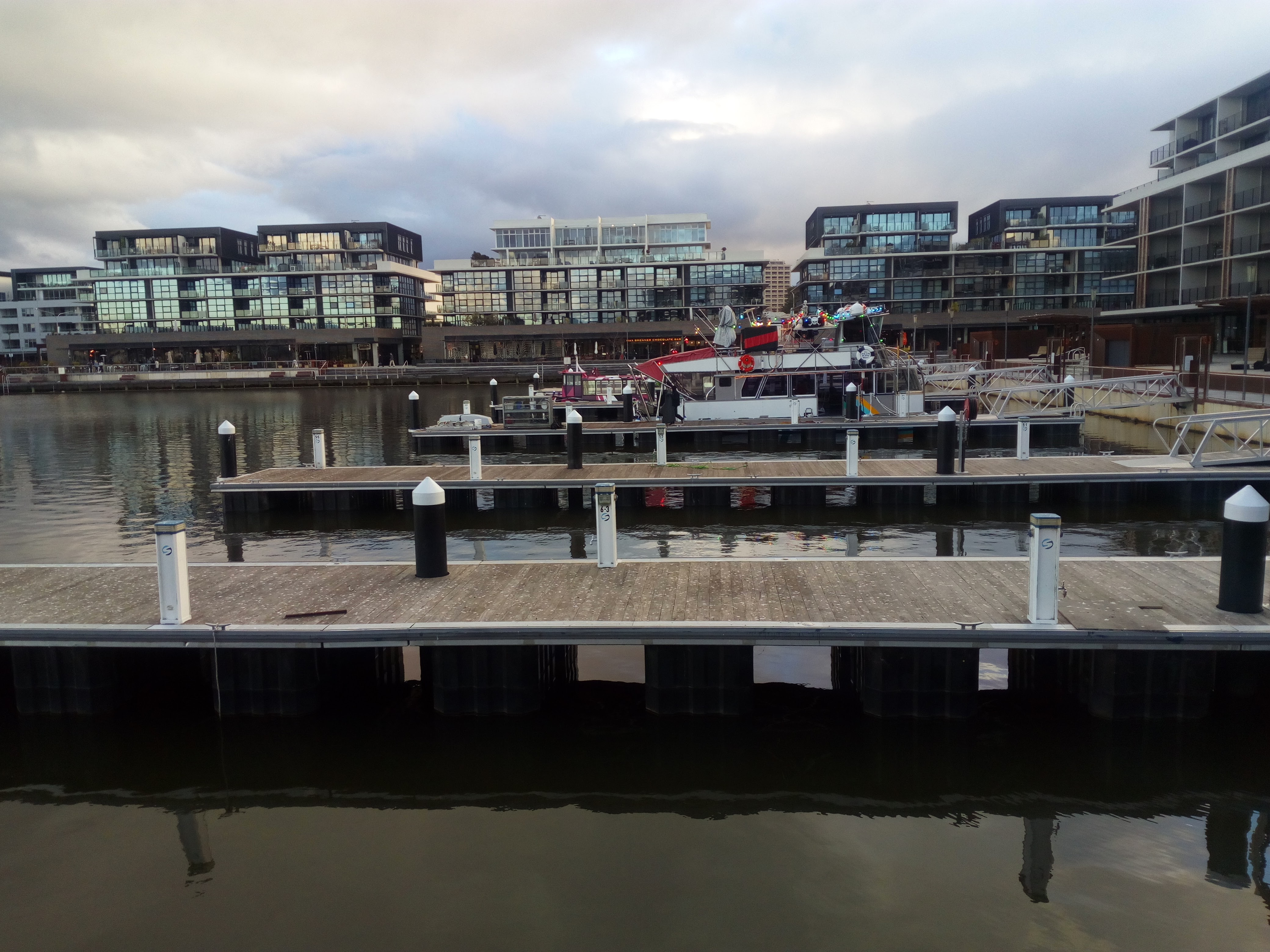
Kingston Boat Harbour

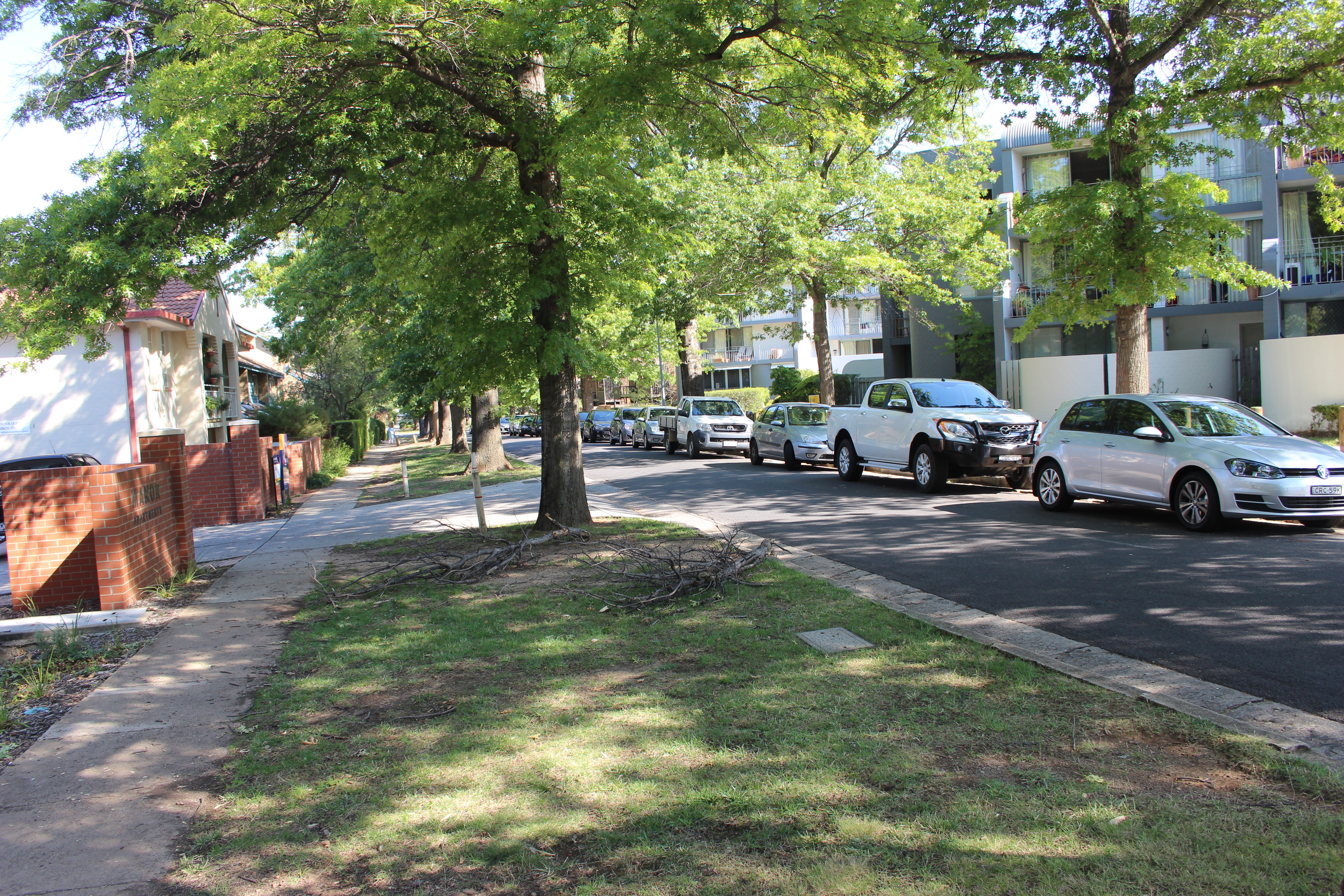
Howitt Street

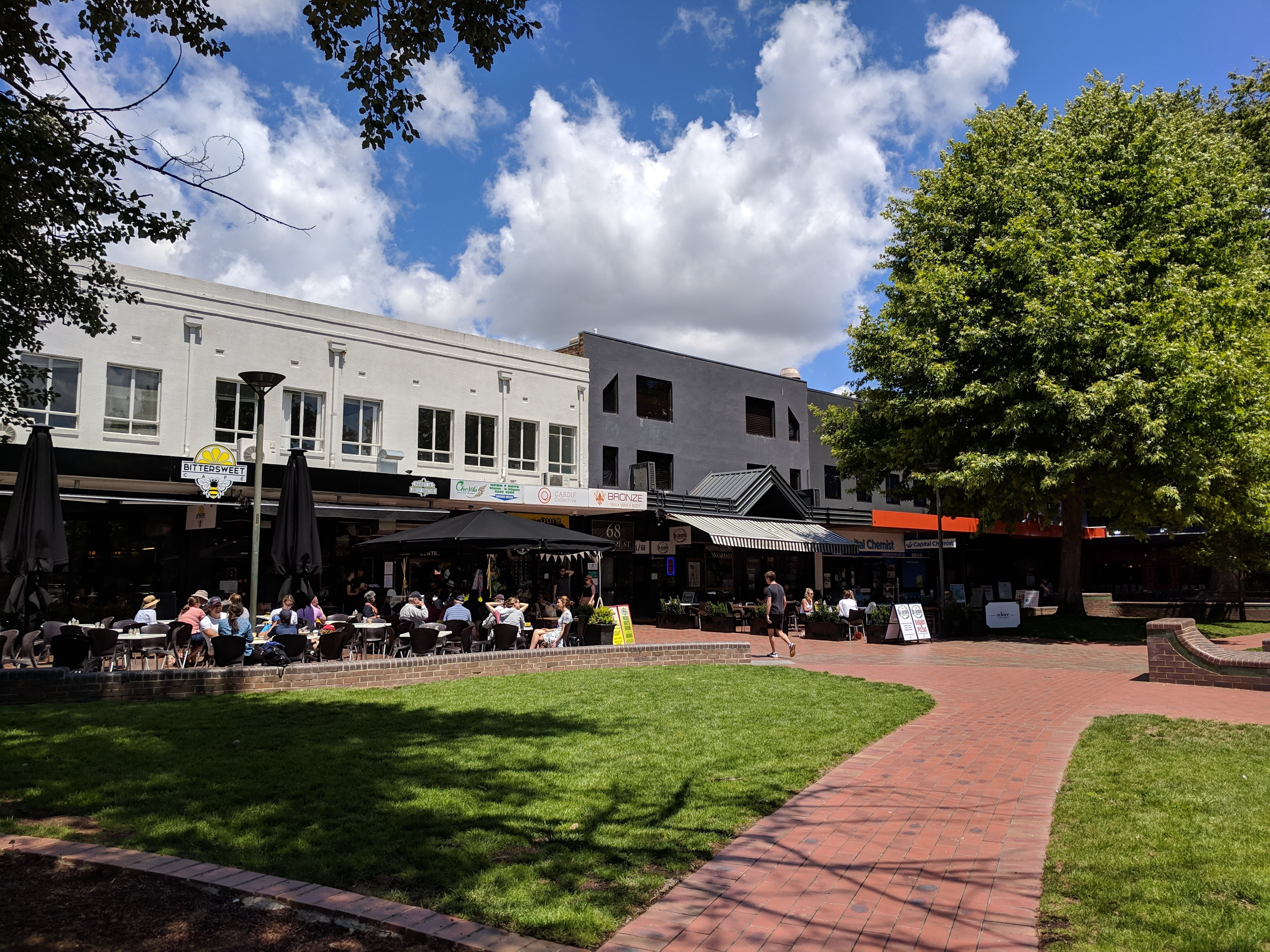
Green Square at Kingston shops

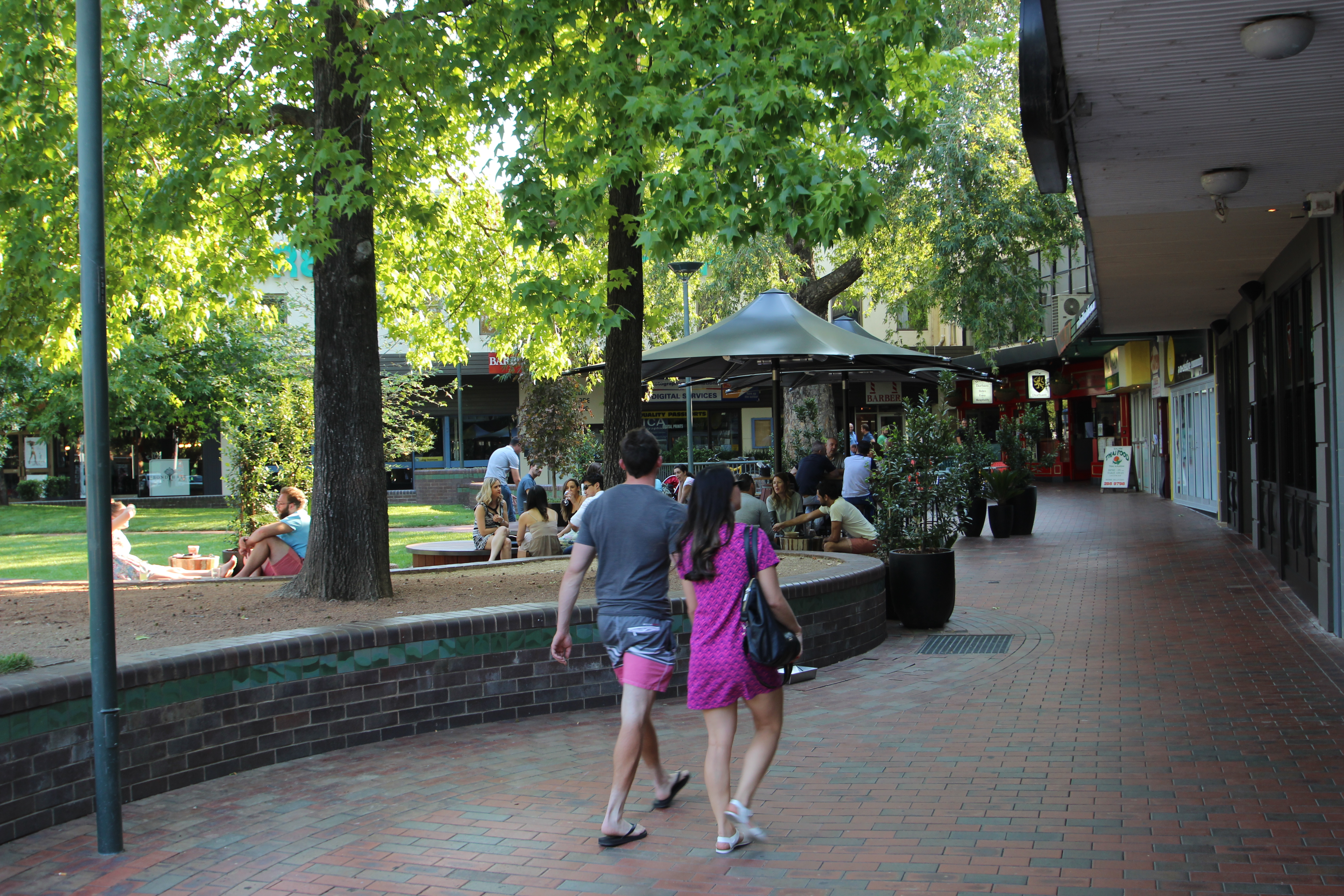
Green square, Kingston shops with recently restored exotic grass (February 2014)

== Geology ==
Silurian age Canberra Formation, calcareous Shale is under this suburb, with Tertiary gravels over the top in the Causeway.
