= Kingston Powerhouse =

Former power station in Canberra, ACT

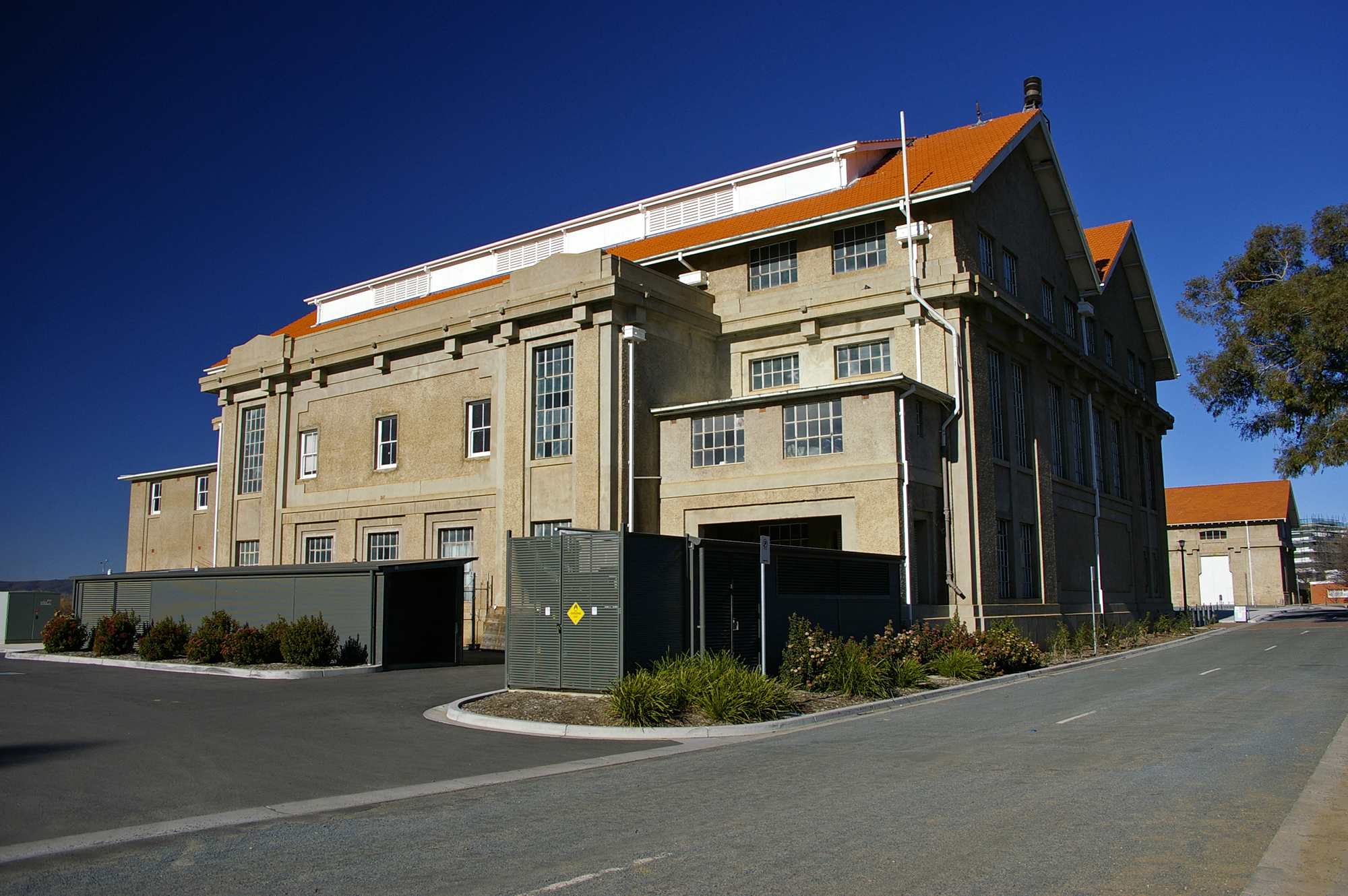
- Country: Australia
- Location: Kingston
- Coordinates: 35°18′42″S 149°08′37″E
- Status: Decommissioned
- Construction began: 1913
- Commission date: 1915
- Decommission date: 1957

Thermal power station
- Primary fuel: Coal

External links
- Commons: Related media on Commons

The Kingston Powerhouse is a decommissioned power plant in Canberra, the capital of Australia. It is located in the suburb of Kingston, Australian Capital Territory. It now houses the Canberra Glassworks.

The powerhouse was designed by John Smith Murdoch and constructed from 1913-1915, when the planned city of Canberra came into being. It was the first permanent public building in Canberra. It was closed in 1929, but reactivated for periods between 1936 and 1942 and between 1948 and 1957. The Fitters’ Workshop, the second permanent public building, is also in the precinct. The siren and whistle, which signalled times to Government outdoor workers in south Canberra for many years is included in the listing. It is now listed by the ACT Heritage Council.

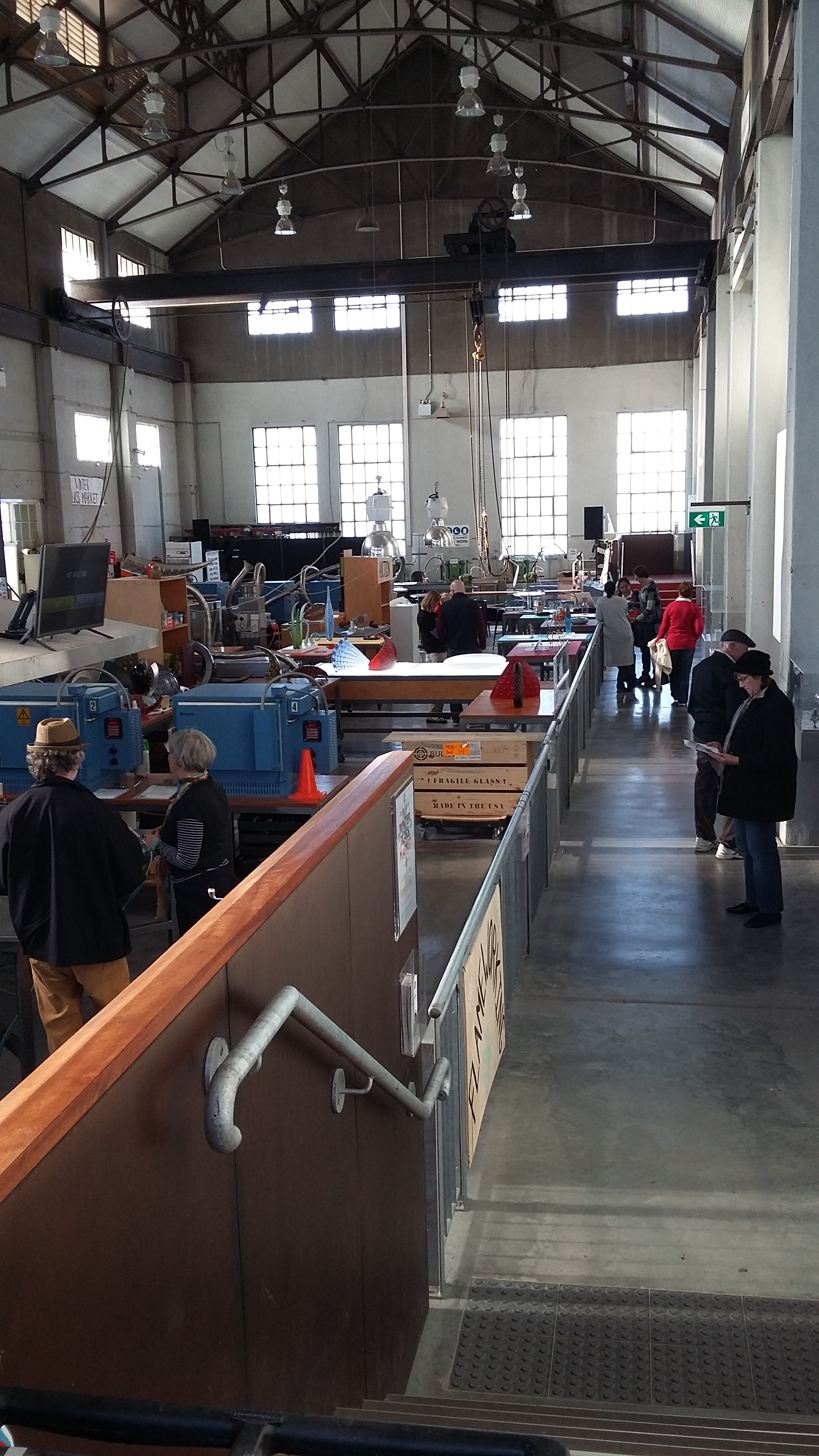
Interior now used as a glass works in June 2015

It was later converted and now houses the Canberra Glassworks.

== Engineering heritage award ==
The power station received a Historic Engineering Marker from Engineers Australia as part of its Engineering Heritage Recognition Program.
