= South Canberra =

- Coordinates: 35°18′39″S 149°07′28″E
- Country: Australia
- State: Australian Capital Territory
- City: Canberra Central

Government
  - Territory electorates: Kurrajong; Murrumbidgee
  - Federal division: Canberra

Area
  - Total: 34.6 km^{2} (13.4 sq mi)

Population
  - Total: 31,592 (2021 census)
  - Density: 913.1/km^{2} (2,365/sq mi)
- Postcode: 2600, 2603, 2604, 2609
Localities around South Canberra
Belconnen	North Canberra	North Canberra
Molonglo Valley	South Canberra	Majura
Woden Valley	Jerrabomberra	Queanbeyan

South Canberra, or the Inner South, is a subdivision of Canberra Central in the Australian Capital Territory in Australia.

South Canberra is separated from North Canberra by Lake Burley Griffin. The two subdivisions combined form the district of Canberra Central and share Civic as their central commercial area.

It is one of the oldest parts of Canberra and is built in part in accordance with Walter Burley Griffin's designs.

According to the 2021 census, South Canberra's population was 31,592.

== Places of note ==
- Australia's Parliament House on Capital Hill.
- Parkes contains the Parliamentary Triangle area.
- Government House the official residence of the governor general.

=== Sites of significance ===
In 1984 the National Capital Development Commission commissioned the identification and documentation of sites of significance in the ACT. The results for Inner Canberra were published in 1988. Sites with both natural and cultural significance were identified. Many of these are listed on the ACT Heritage Register.

Cultural sites of significance:

- Barton: Old Parliament House; Patent Offices (now the Sir Robert Garran Offices housing the Attorney-General's Department); Brassey House; Barton urban conservation area
- Deakin: The Lodge
- Kingston: Kingston shops (Eastlake Shopping Centre); Kingston Power House; Federal Capital Commission houses
- Forrest: Forrest urban conservation area; Street sign; Forrest residences
- Manuka: Housing group; St Christopher's school and convent; Manuka swimming pool; Manuka oval - curator's residence
- Red Hill: House 67, Arthur Circle; Calthorpes' House
- Yarralumla: Bus shelter: Schlich Street (destroyed by fire since identification); Surveyors hut; Albert Hall; Hotel Canberra; Australian Forestry School; Old Canberra Brickworks; Canberra Incinerator; Westbourne Woods; Government House

Natural sites of significance:

- Deakin anticlines
- Rutidosis leptorrhynchoides habitats
- State Circle road cutting
- Red Hill geological site
- Narrabundah Tors
- Hindmarsh Drive road cuttings

== Demographics ==
At the 2021 census, South Canberra had a population of 31,592 of which 48.3% were male and 51.7% were female. Aboriginal and Torres Strait Islander people made up 1.3% of the population, which was lower than the national and territory averages. The median age of people in South Canberra was 40 years, which was slightly higher than the national median of 38 years. Children aged 0–14 years made up 13.7% of the population and people aged 65 years and over made up 18.5% of the population. Of people in the area aged 15 years and over, 45.2% were married and 10.6% were either divorced or separated.

Population growth in North Canberra between the 2001 census and the 2006 census was minus 2.0%; in the five years to the 2011 census, growth was 2.1%; in the five years to the 2016 census, growth was 11.8%; and in the five years to the 2021 census, growth was 17.0%. Population growth in South Canberra was slower than the national average during the first 10 years (national average for each five year period was 5.8% and 8.3% respectively), but it has been significantly faster since (the national average was 8.8% and 8.6% in the last two periods). The median weekly income for residents within South Canberra was significantly higher than the national and territory averages.

== Representation ==
The Inner South is part of the Division of Canberra in the Australian House of Representatives and is currently represented by Alicia Payne. As of 2020, most of the Inner South is represented in the Australian Capital Territory Legislative Assembly by 5 members representing Kurrajong. Deakin and Yarralumla are represented by 5 members representing Murrumbidgee.

Inner South Canberra Community Council: The Inner South Canberra Community Council (ISCCC) is a voluntary, not for profit, community-based association operating in the inner south area of Canberra, in the Australian Capital Territory. The ISCCC is recognised by the ACT Government as a peak community body representing the interests of the local residents, businesses and organisations. The ISCCC’s objective is to preserve and improve the social, cultural, economic and environmental well being of Inner South Canberra and the Inner South Canberra community. The ISCCC Is not a local government.

Selected historical census data for South Canberra
Census year		2001	2006	2011	2016	2021
Population	Estimated residents on census night	24,139	23,668	24,154	27,007	31,592
Population	Percentage of the Australian Capital Territory population	7.8%	▼7.3%	▼6.8%	6.8%	▲7.0%
Population	Percentage of the Australian population	0.13%	▼0.12%	▼0.11%	▲0.12%	0.12%
Birthplace and language diversity						
Birthplace, top responses	Australia	70.9%	▼70.8%	▼70.4%	▼66.7%	▲67.6%
Birthplace, top responses	England	5.1%	▼4.4%	▲4.7%	▼4.1%	▼4.0%
Birthplace, top responses	India	n/a	n/a	1.3%	▲1.6%	▲2.1%
Birthplace, top responses	China	n/a	n/a	n/a	1.5%	▲1.6%
Birthplace, top responses	New Zealand	1.6%	▼1.5%	1.5%	▼1.4%	▼1.3%
Birthplace, top responses	United States	0.8%	▲0.9%	▲1.1%	▲1.3%	1.3%
Language, top responses (other than English)	Mandarin	n/a	n/a	1.0%	▲2.0%	▲2.3%
Language, top responses (other than English)	French	0.8%	▼0.7%	▲1.2%	▲1.6%	▼1.5%
Language, top responses (other than English)	Italian	1.6%	▼1.4%	1.4%	1.4%	▼1.0%
Language, top responses (other than English)	Greek	0.9%	0.9%	▲1.1%	▼0.9%	0.9%
Language, top responses (other than English)	Hindi	n/a	n/a	n/a	n/a	0.9%
Language, top responses (other than English)	Cantonese	n/a	0.7%	0.7%	▲0.8%	n/a
Religious affiliation						
Religious affiliation, top responses	No Religion	21.5%	▲24.9%	▲30.8%	▲38.2%	▲45.8%
Religious affiliation, top responses	Catholic	25.3%	▲25.8%	▼24.3%	▼20.6%	▼18.3%
Religious affiliation, top responses	Anglican	21.4%	▼18.7%	▼16.9%	▼12.1%	▼10.1%
Religious affiliation, top responses	Hinduism	n/a	n/a	n/a	n/a	2.8%
Religious affiliation, top responses	Uniting Church	4.1%	▼3.8%	▼3.3%	▼2.5%	n/a
Median weekly incomes						
Personal income	Median weekly personal income		A$915	A$1,172	A$1,376	A$1,600
Personal income	Percentage of Australian median income		196.4%	▲203.1%	▲207.9%	▼189.7%
Family income	Median weekly family income		A$2,306	A$2,871	A$3,178	A$3,726
Family income	Percentage of Australian median income		196.9%	▼193.9%	▼183.3%	▼175.8%
Household income	Median weekly household income		A$1,711	A$2,383	A$2,333	A$2,711
Household income	Percentage of Australian median income		166.6%	▲193.1%	▼162.2%	▼155.3%
Dwelling structure						
Type	Separate house	57.3%	▼55.5%	▼54.9%	▼45.3%	▼40.6%
Type	Semi-detached, row or terrace house, townhouse etc.	10.1%	10.1%	10.1%	▲12.5%	▼11.7%
Type	Flat, unit or apartment	27.8%	▲33.3%	▲34.9%	▲41.9%	▲47.6%
