= List of buildings and structures in the Australian Capital Territory =

This list of buildings and structures in the Australian Capital Territory includes historically and architecturally significant buildings and structures in the Australian Capital Territory (ACT).

The recognition and legal protection of significant buildings and structures in the ACT is performed by numerous bodies:

- The National Heritage List is a list of places with outstanding heritage value to Australia.
- The Commonwealth Heritage List is specifically for buildings owned by the Australian Government which are significant at any threshold including local, state/territory and National levels.

Places on these lists are protected under the Environment Protection and Biodiversity Conservation Act 1999. Listed places are protected under the Act which means that no-one can take an action that has, will have or is likely to have, a significant impact on the environment of a listed place, including its heritage values, without the approval of the Minister. It is a criminal offence not to comply with this legislation.

Other relevant heritage registers include:

- The Register of the National Estate, a list of historically significant places, this is a non-statutory archive of the now-defunct register.
- The National Trust of Australia administers several properties in the ACT, listing on this register is non-statutory.
- The Australian Capital Territory Heritage Register, places on the register are of particular importance to the people of the ACT and are thought to enrich the understanding of history and identity. Places on the register are legally protected under the Heritage Act 2004, and changes or development of them requires advice by the ACT Heritage Council on development issues to improve conservation outcomes.

The Australian Institute of Architects (AIA) also maintains a register of significant 20th-century buildings. Although it has no legal capacity to protect buildings, it provides information on architecturally significant buildings within the territory. Also listed are buildings registered by the AIA more simply as examples of significant architecture.

== 19th century ==
Name	Year completed	Location	Description and significance	Preservation and access
Canberry, Kanberry	1824	Acton	Canberry was the first building in the ACT.	Canberry was knocked down in 1942 to make way for the construction of the Royal Canberra Hospital.
Duntroon House	1833	Royal Military College, Duntroon	Built by the Campbell family, now the officer's mess at RMC Duntroon. The oldest surviving private building in Canberra.	Commonwealth Heritage List
St John's Anglican Church	1845	Reid	St John's Church is the oldest surviving public building within Canberra's city precinct, predating the establishment of the capital by almost 70 years. The Schoolhouse Museum within the church precinct displays items dating back to Canberra's rural past.	The church building and surrounding precinct remains an active place of worship and Canberra landmark.
Blundells Cottage	1860	Parkes	Blundells Cottage is a five room stone cottage, and is one of the few reminders of the rural history of Canberra left in the city.	The building is listed by the National Trust of Australia and operates as a museum.
Hill Station	1862	Hume	Hill Station is an example of 19th century rural lifestyle and has "a strong association with the early settlement of the ACT". The main homestead was built around 1909.	ACT Heritage Register
Yarralumla	1891	Yarralumla	Built by the Campbell family, the house became the home of the Governor-General of Australia from 1927.	Commonwealth Heritage List
Lambrigg Homestead	1894	Tharwa		ACT Heritage Register
Tharwa Bridge	1895	Tharwa	Tharwa Bridge was the first bridge built across the Murrumbidgee River.	The four span Allan truss bridge is still open to traffic. (Closed in 2006 - temporarily) The bridge reopened in August 2008 to light traffic, below 5 tonnes.

== 20th century ==
=== Pre World War II ===
Name	Year established	Location	Description and significance	Preservation and access
Yarralumla Woolshed & Outbuildings	1904	Adjacent to Yarralumla	Fredrick Campbell built this large woolshed for his nearby property Yarralumla.	The woolshed is available for hire as a party venue. ACT Heritage Register, Register of Significant Twentieth Century Architecture
ANU Cottage No 3	~1913	Acton		Commonwealth Heritage List, Register of Significant Twentieth Century Architecture
Commencement Column Monument	1913	Capital Hill	The Commencement Column Monument is composed of three foundation stones with inscriptions, set in a hexagonal base (of an intended but never completed column) and was designed by J S Murdoch.	Commonwealth Heritage List
Old Canberra House	1913	Acton	Designed by J S Murdoch it was the first two-storey masonry structure in the new capital.	Commonwealth Heritage List, Register of the National Estate
Cotter Pumping Station & Electrical Sub-station	1912-15	Confluence of the Cotter and Murrumbidgee Rivers	Closed to the public, visible from Cotter Road.	ACT Heritage Register, Register of Significant Twentieth Century Architecture
Kingston Powerhouse	1915	Kingston	The powerhouse was the first permanent public building in the ACT. It was designed by John Smith Murdoch in the Federal Capital style.	ACT Heritage Register
Yarralumla brickworks	1914-15	Yarralumla	Numerous additions made until 1979.	Closed to the public. ACT Heritage Register, Register of Significant Twentieth Century Architecture
General Bridges' Grave	1920	Royal Military College, Duntroon	Memorial Grave of designed by architect Walter Burley Griffin	Commonwealth Heritage List, Register of Significant Twentieth Century Architecture
Westlake	1922	Yarralumla	Accommodation for construction workers including cottages designed by H M Rolland	Completely demolished. Unrestricted public access to the site.
Mount Stromlo Administration Building	1924	Stromlo	Badly damaged by bushfires in 2003.	Fenced off from the public. Commonwealth Heritage List, Register of Significant Twentieth Century Architecture
Gorman House Community Arts Centre	1924-25	Braddon	The first hostel completed for the Federal Capital Advisory Committee. It was designed by the Commonwealth Architect John Smith Murdoch in the Garden-Pavilion style.	The buildings are used by various community groups. Many of the buildings are open to the public during regular markets. ACT Heritage Register, Register of Significant Twentieth Century Architecture
Alt Crescent Buildings & Precinct	1923-26	Ainslie		ACT Heritage Register
Australian Forestry School	1926	Yarralumla		Now part of CSIRO, Register of Significant Twentieth Century Architecture
Hotel Canberra	1922-26	Yarralumla	Hotel Canberra was designed by architect John Smith Murdoch in the Garden-Pavilion style drawing strong influences from American Prairie, Californian Bungalow and Australian Colonial styles.	The Hotel is open to the public and operated by Hyatt, it is listed by the National Trust.
East Block Government Offices	1925-26	Parkes		Commonwealth Heritage List, Register of Significant Architecture
Ainslie Public and Primary Schools	1927	Braddon	The first modern school open in the ACT, designed in the Art Deco style.	ACT Heritage Register, Register of Significant Twentieth Century Architecture
Albert Hall	1927	Yarralumla	It was designed by J H Kirkpatrick, R Casboulte and H M Rolland, and is representative of the Federal Style of architecture in early Canberra.	Venue available for hire. ACT Heritage Register
Calthorpes' House	1927	Red Hill		ACT Heritage Register
Corroboree Park Housing Precinct	1925-1927	Ainslie		ACT Heritage Register, Register of Significant Architecture
Forrest Urban Conservation Area	1924-27	Forrest		ACT Heritage Register, Register of Significant Twentieth Century Architecture
Hotel Kurrajong	1925-27	Barton		ACT Heritage Register, Register of Significant Twentieth Century Architecture, Register of the National Estate
Kingston Transport Depot	1927	Kingston		ACT Heritage Register, Register of Significant Twentieth Century Architecture
The Lodge	1927	Deakin	The Lodge is a two-storey, rendered brick building in the Colonial Revival style with Georgian detailing. It has been the Canberra residence for most of Australia's Prime Ministers.	Annual open days for public viewing. Commonwealth Heritage List
Melbourne & Sydney Buildings	1927	City Centre	The pair of Inter-War Mediterranean style buildings were the earliest major developments in the City Centre	The exterior and remaining original interiors are protected by the ACT Heritage Register. They are still used for commercial purposes.
Mercure Hotel Canberra	1926-27	Braddon		Register of the National Estate
Old Parliament House	1927	Parkes		Open to the public as a museum and home of the National Portrait Gallery. Commonwealth Heritage List, National Heritage List
Reid Urban Conservation Area	1926-27	Reid		ACT Heritage Register, Register of the National Estate
West Block Government Offices	1925-27, additional wing added in 1944	Parkes		Commonwealth Heritage List, Register of Significant Architecture
Westridge House	1928	Yarralumla		Private Residence owned by the CSIRO.
Canberra Baptist Church & Manse	1928-29	Kingston		ACT Heritage Register, Register of Significant Twentieth Century Architecture
Ian Potter House	1927-29	Acton	The exterior of the house is in Inter-War Georgian Revival style and was designed by Anketell and Kingsley Henderson. The house was originally used to house female public servants.	ACT Heritage Register
Australian Institute of Anatomy	1930	Acton		The building currently houses the National Film and Sound Archive. Commonwealth Heritage List
Manuka Housing Precinct	1930	Griffith		Register of Significant Twentieth Century Architecture
Manuka Swimming Pool	1930	Griffith	The pool was an important social hub for early Canberra from 1930 until the 1960s. It is built in the Federal Capital Style.	Open to the public, admission charge. ACT Heritage Register
The Pines	1930	Forrest		ACT Heritage Register, Register of Significant Architecture
ANU Drill Hall	1930-31	Acton		Commonwealth Heritage List, Register of Significant Twentieth Century Architecture
Barton Court	1934-35	Barton		Register of Significant Twentieth Century Architecture
Sri Lankan Embassy	1935	Forrest		Register of Significant Twentieth Century Architecture
Former Forrest Fire Station & Residence	1938	Forest	Designed by Edwin Henderson and Cuthbert Whitley, the buildings are an example of typical Canberra inter-war functionalism.	House the Canberra Fire Brigade Museum. Register of the National Estate, ACT Heritage Register, Register of Significant Twentieth Century Architecture
Belconnen Naval Transmission Station	1938-39	Belconnen	Transmitting station for Bonshaw Receiving Station at HMAS Harman; the 600 ft masts were brought to ground on 20 December 2006.	Register of the National Estate, Commonwealth Heritage List
Canberra School of Art	1939	Acton	A two-storey rendered brick symmetrical Art Deco style school with central clock tower.	Commonwealth Heritage List, Register of the National Estate
St Paul's Church of England	1938-39	Griffith		ACT Heritage Register, Register of Significant Twentieth Century Architecture
Evans Crescent Housing Precinct	1939-40	Griffith		ACT Heritage Register, Register of Significant Twentieth Century Architecture
Robert Marsden Hope Building (Patent Office, Robert Garran Offices)	1939-40	Barton		Commonwealth Heritage List, Register of Significant Twentieth Century Architecture
Australian War Memorial	1929-41	Campbell		Commonwealth Heritage List, National Heritage List, Register of the National Estate, Register of Significant Twentieth Century Architecture, National Trust Register
Canberra City Garbage Incinerator	1938-41	Yarralumla	One of the few remaining examples of the incinerators designed by W B Griffin and E M Nicholls between 1929-38.	Register of the National Estate
Canberra Hospital Administration Building, former	1941-43	Acton		Many of the old hospital buildings are now used by the Australian National University. Commonwealth Heritage List, Register of Significant Twentieth Century Architecture
USA Chancery, Residence & Precinct	1942-43	Yarralumla	Additions in 1948 and 1958.	Register of Significant Twentieth Century Architecture
Changi Chapel	1944	Royal Military College, Duntroon		Commonwealth Heritage List, Register of Significant Twentieth Century Architecture

=== Post World War II ===
Name	Year established	Location	Description and significance	Preservation and access
Beaufort House	1947	Ainslie		Register of Significant Twentieth Century Architecture
Royal Swedish Embassy	1951	Yarralumla		Nominated to the Commonwealth Heritage List
Manning Clark House	1953	Forrest		ACT Heritage Register, Register of Significant Twentieth Century Architecture
The Fenner House	1953-54	Red Hill		ACT Heritage Register
University House	1954	Acton		Commonwealth Heritage List, Register of Significant Twentieth Century Architecture
Canberra Olympic Pool	1953—1955	Civic	Modernist post-war international style public pool by Commonwealth Department of Public Works architect Ian Slater, with Australia's first concrete diving tower. Designed in 1953, winner of the 1955 Sulman Medal.	Open to the public. Register of the National Estate
John Gorton Building	1927 (foundation built then cancelled); 1956 (rebuilt)	Parkes	An Art Deco building that was built over the span of several decades. Construction initially began in 1927, before it was quickly cancelled due to budgetary constraints and substandard foundations. Construction started over in 1946, and the building finally opened in 1956.	Commonwealth Heritage List
Allawah & Bega Courts	1956-57	Braddon & Reid		Register of Significant Twentieth Century Architecture
Arnold Grove	1958	Gungahlin		Register of Significant Twentieth Century Architecture
Forrest Townhouses	1959	Forrest		Register of Significant Twentieth Century Architecture
Mackie House	1959	Forrest		Register of Significant Twentieth Century Architecture
Northbourne Flats	1959	Braddon & Turner		Register of Significant Twentieth Century Architecture
The Shine Dome	1959	Acton	The Dome is thought to be only example in Australia of geometric structuralism and was designed by Sir Roy Grounds.	The Shine Dome is houses the offices of the Australian Academy of Science, it is occasionally open for public lectures. National Heritage List
Townhouse Motor Inn	1960	Civic		Demolished in 1987. Register of Significant Twentieth Century Architecture
Vasey Crescent Houses	1960	Campbell		ACT Heritage Register, Register of Significant Twentieth Century Architecture
Holy Trinity Lutheran Church	1961	Turner		ACT Heritage Register, Register of Significant Twentieth Century Architecture
Northbourne Housing Precinct	1959-62	Dickson & Lyneham	Lyneham, Dickson, and Owen Flats were designed by Sydney Ancher.	Mostly demolished, some examples remain. ACT Heritage Register, Register of Significant Twentieth Century Architecture
ANZ Bank Building	1961-63	Civic		ACT Heritage Register, Register of Significant Twentieth Century Architecture
Monaro Mall	1961-63	Civic		Now part of the Canberra Centre, refurbished 2017. Register of Significant Twentieth Century Architecture.
RG Menzies Building	1961-63	Acton	The building holds the ANU collections relating to Asia and the Pacific, theses, Rare books, special collections and the United Nations collection.	It is open to the public. Commonwealth Heritage List, ACT Heritage Register
Canberra Grammar School and Chapel	1929-65	Red Hill	Church school complex which is a good example of the inter-war Gothic style. The initial construction was completed in 1929, numerous additions have been made since.	ACT Heritage Register, Register of the National Estate, Register of Significant Twentieth Century Architecture
Cater House	1965	Red Hill		Register of Significant Twentieth Century Architecture
Kanangra Court	1965	Reid		Register of Significant Twentieth Century Architecture
Reserve Bank of Australia	1963-65	Civic	Australia's first national central bank, in minimalist style.	Commonwealth Heritage List
Royal Australian Mint	1965	Deakin		Commonwealth Heritage List
ANZAC Memorial Chapel of St Paul	1966	Royal Military College, Duntroon		Commonwealth Heritage List, Register of Significant Twentieth Century Architecture
Dingle House/de Quetteville Residence	1966	Hughes		ACT Heritage Register, Register of Significant Twentieth Century Architecture
Law Courts of the ACT & Precinct	1962-66	Civic		Register of Significant Twentieth Century Architecture
Barton Conference Centre	1967	Barton		Register of Significant Architecture
Birch House	1967	Yarralumla		Register of Significant Twentieth Century Architecture
Campbell Group Housing	1968	Campbell		ACT Heritage Register, Register of Significant Twentieth Century Architecture
Colonial Mutual Building	1967-68	Civic		Register of Significant Twentieth Century Architecture
National Library of Australia	1968	Parkes		Commonwealth Heritage List
Dickson Library	1969	Dickson		ACT Heritage Register, Register of Significant Twentieth Century Architecture
Guardian House	1969	Phillip		Demolished. Register of Significant Twentieth Century Architecture
Fisher Government Housing	1970	Fisher		Register of Significant Twentieth Century Architecture
National Carillon	1969-70	Parkes	An example of the late twentieth century brutalist style designed by architects Cameron Chisholm Nicol and forms a part of the Parliamentary Triangle. It was given to Australia by the British Government to commemorate Canberra's 50th anniversary.	Open to the public and listed on the Commonwealth Heritage List, Register of Significant Twentieth Century Architecture
AIA Headquarters	1968-70	Red Hill		ACT Heritage Register, Register of Significant Twentieth Century Architecture
Burgmann College	1971	Acton		Register of Significant Twentieth Century Architecture
Canberra National Seventh Day Adventist Church	1971	Turner		ACT Heritage Register, Register of Significant Twentieth Century Architecture
Open Systems House	1971	Braddon		Register of Significant Twentieth Century Architecture
Swinger Hill Stages 1 & 2 Cluster Housing	1970-71	Phillip		ACT Heritage Register, Register of Significant Twentieth Century Architecture
RN Robertson Building	1972	Acton	Refurbished in 2017	Register of Significant Twentieth Century Architecture
Hackett Courtyard Housing Precinct	1966-73	Hackett		Register of Significant Twentieth Century Architecture
Wilson House	1973	Aranda		Register of Significant Twentieth Century Architecture
Edmund Barton Building	1970-74	Barton	Building was designed by Harry Seidler. It is 'outstanding example of the late twentieth-century international style of architecture in Australia and is the largest such example in the National Capital'.	Commonwealth Heritage List
UC Student Residences Group 2	1975	Bruce	Designed by John Andrews	ACT Heritage Register, Register of Significant Twentieth Century Architecture
ANU School of Music	1976	Acton	Designed in the late twentieth-century brutalist style with strong sculptural forms by Daryl Jackson and Evan Walker. The building includes the 1500 seat Llewellyn Hall.	Commonwealth Heritage List
Cameron Offices	1970-76	Belconnen	Designed by John Andrews, in the late twentieth century brutalist style.	Wings 1, 2, 6, 7, 8, and 9 of the complex were demolished in 2007-08. Wings 3, 4, and 5, and the bridge still remain and are on the Commonwealth Heritage List.
Girlalang Primary School	1975-76	Girralang		ACT Heritage Register, Register of Significant Twentieth Century Architecture
Toad Hall	1977	Acton	Student residence in late twentieth century late modern style designed by internationally acclaimed architect John Andrews.	ANU student residence. Commonwealth Heritage List, Register of Significant Twentieth Century Architecture
CSC Building	1978-79	Braddon		Register of Significant Twentieth Century Architecture
High Court of Australia	1975-80	Parkes	The High Court building was designed by Christopher Kringas, Colin Madigan, and Edwards Madigan Torzillo and Briggs.	Commonwealth Heritage List
Callam Offices	1977-81	Phillip	A John Andrews design with late twentieth-century structuralist style and unique suspension of office "pods" above a floodplain.	ACT Heritage Register, Register of Significant Twentieth Century Architecture
National Gallery of Australia	1973-82	Parkes	The National Gallery was designed by Colin Madigan and built from reinforced concrete.	The Gallery and the adjoining sculpture garden are open to the public and are listed on the Commonwealth Heritage List.
Parliament House	1981-88	Capital Hill	The meeting place of the Parliament of Australia, designed by Romaldo Giurgola in the postmodern architectural style, and costing $1.1B to complete.	Open to the public. Commonwealth Heritage List, Register of Significant Twentieth Century Architecture
Questacon	1986-88	Parkes	The National Science and Technology Centre, donated to Australia by Japan as a bicentenary gift. Formerly housed at Ainslie Primary School.	Visitor centre open to the public.
Australian Centre for Christianity and Culture	1999	Barton	A Christian ecumenical centre and chapel. Associated with Saint Mark's National Theological Centre and Charles Sturt University.	Open to the public.

== See also ==
- Commonwealth Heritage List in the Australian Capital Territory and Jervis Bay Territory
- Government housing in Canberra
