= Commonwealth Heritage List in the Australian Capital Territory and Jervis Bay Territory =

The Commonwealth Heritage List is a heritage register which lists places of historic, cultural and natural heritage on Commonwealth land or in Commonwealth waters, or owned or managed by the Commonwealth Government. To be listed, a place has to meet one or more of nine criteria. The Commonwealth Heritage List lists entries for both the Australian Capital Territory and the separate Jervis Bay Territory under the former.

== Currently listed places ==
Listed are all 83 places in the Australian Capital Territory and Jervis Bay Territory that are on the Commonwealth Heritage List as of January 2025:

Place name	Place ID	Class & Criteria	List date	Address	Coordinates	Photo	Plan
Acton Conservation Area	105340	Historic; A, B, D, H	15 Jul 2004	Liversidge St; Acton	35°17′05″S 149°07′10″E		
Acton Peninsula Building 1 (Isolation Ward)	105341	Historic; A, D, G, H	15 Jul 2004	Lennox Cros; Acton	35°17′30″S 149°07′10″E		
Acton Peninsula Building 15 (Medical Superintendents Residence)	105342	Historic; A, D, G, H	15 Jul 2004	Lennox Cros; Acton	35°17′27″S 149°07′07″E		
Acton Peninsula Building 2 (H Block)	105343	Historic; A, D, G, H	15 Jul 2004	Lennox Cros; Acton	35°17′29″S 149°07′08″E		
Acton Peninsula Limestone Outcrops	105344	Historic; A, E	15 Jul 2004	Lawson Cr; Acton	35°17′25″S 149°07′08″E		
Anzac Memorial Chapel of St Paul	105184	Historic; B, D	15 Jul 2004	Miles Rd; Campbell	35°17′47″S 149°10′06″E		
Apostolic Nunciature	105191	Historic; E, F, G, H	15 Jul 2004	2 Vancouver St; Red Hill	35°19′37.69″S 149°07′35.51″E		
Apple Shed Asset C58	105182	Historic; A, E	15 Jul 2004	Plant Rd; Campbell	35°18′01″S 149°09′50″E		
Australian American Memorial and Sir Thomas Blamey Square	105313	Historic; A, E, G	15 Jul 2004	Russell Dr; Russell	35°17′52″S 149°09′05″E		
Australian Forestry School (former)	105426	Historic; A, D, E, F, G, H	15 Jul 2004	Banks St; Yarralumla	35°18′14″S 149°05′42″E		
Australian National Botanic Gardens (part)	105345	Historic; B, C, E, F	15 Jul 2004	Clunies Ross St; Acton	35°16′44″S 149°06′33″E		
Australian War Memorial	105469	Historic; A, B, D, E, F, G, H	15 Jul 2004	Anzac Pde; Campbell	35°16′50″S 149°08′57″E		
Blundells Farmhouse, Slab Outbuilding and Surrounds	105734	Historic; A, B, D, E, H	15 Jul 2005	Wendouree Dr; Parkes	35°17′35″S 149°08′31″E		
CSIRO Main Entomology Building	105348	Historic; A, D	15 Jul 2004	Clunies Ross St; Acton	35°16′29″S 149°06′51″E		
Cameron Offices (Wings 3, 4 and 5, and Bridge)	105410	Historic; B, D, F, H	22 Aug 2005	Chandler St; Belconnen	35°14′31″S 149°4′11″E		
Canberra School of Art	105765	Historic; A, D, F, H	14 Sep 2009	Childers St; Canberra	35°16′51″S 149°07′21″E		
Canberra School of Music	105636	Historic; A, D, F, G, H	15 Jul 2004	William Herbert Pl; Canberra	35.281°S 149.124°E		
Cape St George Lighthouse Ruins & Curtilage	105312	Historic; A, C, E	15 Jul 2004	Stony Creek Rd; Jervis Bay	35°9′7″S 150°45′41″E		
Captains Quarters Assets B1 to B4	105382	Historic; A, D, E	15 Jul 2004	1-4 Harrison Rd; Campbell	35°17′46″S 149°10′01″E		
Carillon	105346	Historic; D, E	15 Jul 2004	Wendouree Dr; Parkes	35°17′55″S 149°08′30″E		
Casey House and Garden	105629	Historic; A, D, H	15 Jul 2004	4 Rhodes Pl; Yarralumla	35°18′16″S 149°07′12″E		
Changi Chapel	105188	Historic; B, G	15 Jul 2004	Miles Rd; Campbell	35°17′48″S 149°10′02″E		
Christians [sic] Minde Settlement	105314	Historic; A, B, D, E, H	15 Jul 2004	Ellmoos Rd; Sussex Inlet	35°09′21″S 150°36′24″E		
Commandants House Asset B9 (Bridges House)	105386	Historic; A, D, E	15 Jul 2004	6 Robert Campbell Rd; Campbell	35°17′50″S 149°10′06″E		
Commencement Column Monument	105347	Historic; A, G, H	15 Jul 2004	Federation Mall; Capital Hill	35°18′21″S 149°07′35″E		
Communications Centre	105618	Historic; A, B, F, H	15 Jul 2004	King Edward Tce; Parkes	35°18′09″S 149°08′01″E		
Drill Hall Gallery	105635	Historic; A, B, D, H	15 Jul 2004	Kingsley St; Acton	35°16′35″S 149°07′25″E		
Duntroon House and Garden	105448	Historic; A, D, E, G, H	15 Jul 2004	Harrison Rd; Campbell	35°17′58″S 149°09′49″E		
East Block Government Offices	105349	Historic; A, D, F, H	15 Jul 2004	Queen Victoria Tce; Parkes	35°18′18″S 149°07′50″E		
Edmund Barton Offices	105476	Historic; B, D, E, F, H	3 Jun 2005	Kings Av; Barton	35°18′18″N 149°08′10″E		
General Bridges Grave	105439	Historic; A, E, G, H	15 Jul 2004	General Bridges Dr; Campbell	35°17′47″S 149°09′50″E		
Gungahlin Complex	105437	Historic; A, B, D, E, F, H	15 Jul 2004	Barton Hwy; Crace	35°13′14″S 149°07′36″E		
Gungahlin Homestead and Landscape	105434	Historic; A, B, D, E, F, H	15 Jul 2004	Barton Hwy; Crace	35°13′14″S 149°07′36″E		
High Court - National Gallery Precinct	105544	Historic; A, B, D, E, F, G, H	15 Jul 2004	Parkes Pl; Parkes	35°18′00″S 149°08′10″E		
High Court of Australia	105557	Historic; A, E, F, G, H	15 Jul 2004	King Edward Tce; Parkes	35°17′57″S 149°08′09″E		
Institute of Anatomy (former) (National Film and Sound Archive)	105351	Historic; A, B, D, F, G	15 Jul 2004	McCoy Cct; Acton	35°16′59″S 149°07′17″E		
Jervis Bay Botanic Gardens	105400	Historic; A, C, D, E	15 Jul 2004	Beach Rd; Jervis Bay	35°08′41″S 150°40′27″E		
Jervis Bay Territory	105394	Indigenous; A, B, C, G, I	15 Jul 2004	Jervis Bay Rd; Jervis Bay	35°07′44″S 150°42′22″E		
John Gorton Building	105472	Historic; D, E	15 Jul 2004	Parkes Pl; Parkes	35°18′07″S 149°08′04″E		
King George V Memorial	105352	Historic; A, D, E, H	15 Jul 2004	King George Tce; Parkes	35°18′04″S 149°07′47″E		
Lake Burley Griffin and Adjacent Lands	105230	Historic; A, B, C, D, E, F, G, H	8 Apr 2022	Lady Denman Dr; Yarralumla	35°17′40″S 149°08′11″E		
Lennox House Complex	105307	Historic; A, B, D, G, H	15 Jul 2004	Lennox Crossing; Acton	35°17′20″S 149°07′02″E		
Majura Valley Natural Temperate Grassland	105991	Natural; B, C, D	22 Dec 2015	Majura Rd; Majura Park	35°16′48″S 149°11′04″E		
Mount Stromlo Observatory Precinct	105309	Historic; A, B, D, E, G, H	15 Jul 2004	Mt Stromlo Rd; Mt Stromlo	35°19′10″S 149°00′23″E		
National Gallery of Australia	105558	Historic; A, B, D, E, F, G, H	15 Jul 2004	Parkes Pl; Parkes	35°18′01″S 149°08′12″E		
National Library of Australia and Surrounds	105470	Historic; A, D, E, F, G, H	15 Jul 2004	Parkes Pl; Parkes	35°17′47″S 149°07′47″E		
National Rose Gardens	105473	Historic; A, B, E	15 Jul 2004	King George Tce; Parkes	35°18′11″S 149°7′52″E		
Old Parliament House Gardens	105616	Historic; A, D, E, F, H	15 Jul 2004	King George Tce; Parkes	35°18′11″S 149°07′51″E (House); 35°18′06″S 149°07′41″E (Senate)		
Old Parliament House and Curtilage	105318	Historic; A, B, D, E, F, G, H	15 Jul 2004	King George Tce; Parkes	35°18′07″S 149°07′48″E		
Parade Ground and Associated Buildings Group	105183	Historic; A, D, E, H	15 Jul 2004	Harrison Rd; Campbell	35°17′54″S 149°09′49″E		
Parliament House Vista	105466	Historic; A, E, F, G, H	15 Jul 2004	Anzac Pde; Parkes	35°18′23″S 149°07′34″E		
Parliament House Vista Extension - Portal Buildings (Anzac Park West and former East buildings)	105474	Historic; A, D, E, H	15 Jul 2004	Anzac Pde; Parkes	35°17′21″S 149°08′22″E (West); 35°17′26″S 149°08′29″E (East)		
Patent Office (former) (Robert Marsden Hope Building)	105454	Historic; A, D, E, F	15 Jul 2004	Kings Av; Barton	35°18′20″S 149°07′53″E		
Phytotron, Canberra	105560	Historic; A, B, F, H	15 Jul 2004	Julius St; Acton			
R G Menzies Building ANU (Menzies Library)	105685	Historic; A, D, F, H	15 Jul 2005	McDonald Pl; Acton	35°16′56″S 149°07′05″E		
RMC Duntroon Conservation Area	105449	Historic; D, E, F, G, H	15 Jul 2004	Harrison Rd; Campbell	35°17′57″S 149°09′56″E		
Redwood Plantation	105196	Historic; A, C, E, F, H	15 Jul 2004	Pialligo Av; Pialligo	35°19′11″S 149°12′04″E		
Reserve Bank of Australia	105396	Historic; A, D, E, F	15 Jul 2004	20-22 London Cct; Canberra	35°16′49″S 149°07′37″E		
Residence Asset B5 (Waller Lodge)	105391	Historic; A, D, E	15 Jul 2004	2 Robert Campbell Rd; Campbell	35°17′51″S 149°10′01″E		
Residence Asset B7 (Haydon House)	105384	Historic; A, D, E	15 Jul 2004	4 Robert Campbell Rd; Campbell	35°17′50″S 149°10′03″E		
Residence Asset C12 (Gwynn House)	105387	Historic; A, D, E	15 Jul 2004	1 Parnell Rd; Campbell	35°17′56″S 149°09′59″E		
Residence Asset C13 (Sinclair-MacLagan House)	105388	Historic; A, D, E, H	15 Jul 2004	2 Parnell Rd; Campbell	35°17′56″S 149°10′00″E		
Residence Asset C14 (Barnard House)	105389	Historic; A, D, E	15 Jul 2004	3 Parnell Rd; Campbell	35°17′54″S 149°10′01″E		
Residence Asset C15 (Hosking House)	105390	Historic; A, D, E	15 Jul 2004	4 Parnell Rd; Campbell	35°17′54″S 149°10′02″E		
Residence Asset C7 (Hiscock House)	105385	Historic; A, D, E	15 Jul 2004	2 Plant Rd; Campbell	35°18′00″S 149°09′48″E		
Residence Asset C8 (Shappere House)	105383	Historic; A, D, E	15 Jul 2004	3 Plant Rd; Campbell	35°18′02″S 149°09′49″E		
Royal Australian Naval College	105380	Historic; A, D, E, F, H	15 Jul 2004	College Rd; Jervis Bay	35°07′27″S 150°42′26″E		
Royal Australian Naval Transmitting Station	105519	Historic; A, B, D, F, G	15 Jul 2004	Baldwin Dr; Lawson	35°13′18″S 149°05′20″E		
Russell Precinct Heritage Area	105621	Historic; A, D, E, F, G, H	15 Jul 2004	Sir Thomas Blamey Sq; Russell	35°17′52″S 149°09′05″E		
Sculpture Garden National Gallery of Australia	105630	Historic; A, B, D, E, F, G, H	15 Jul 2004	Parkes Pl; Parkes	35°18′00″S 149°08′16″E		
State Circle Cutting	105733	Natural; A, B, C, D, H	3 Jun 2005	State Ccl; Parkes	35°18′15″S 149°07′36″E		
Synemon Plana Moth Habitat	105535	Historic; A, B, C	15 Jul 2004	Baldwin Dr; Lawson	35°13′18″S 149°05′20″E		
The CSIRO Forestry Precinct	105595	Historic; A, C, E, F, G, H	15 Jul 2004	Banks St; Yarralumla			
The Lodge	105452	Historic; A, B, C, D, E, F, G, H	15 Jul 2004	5 Adelaide Av; Deakin	35°18′39″S 149°07′00″E		
The Royal Australian Mint	106191	Historic; A, B, D, G	22 Feb 2016	Denison St; Deakin	35°19′07″S 149°05′35″E		
The Surveyors Hut	105467	Historic; A, F, H	15 Jul 2004	State Ccl; Capital Hill	35°18′16″S 149°07′23″E		
Three Wartime Bomb Dump Buildings	105588	Historic; A, B, D	15 Jul 2004	Pialligo Av; Pialligo			
Toad Hall ANU	105637	Historic; A, D, F, G, H	15 Jul 2004	Kingsley St; Acton			
University House and Garden	105190	Historic; A, D, E, F, G, H	15 Jul 2004	Balmain Cr; Acton			
West Block and the Dugout	105428	Historic; A, B, D, E, F, H	15 Jul 2004	Queen Victoria Tce; Parkes	35°18′08″S 149°07′34″E		
Westridge House & Grounds	105427	Historic; A, E, F, H	15 Jul 2004	Banks St; Yarralumla			
Yarralumla and Surrounds (Government House)	105381	Historic; A, B, E, F, G, H	15 Jul 2004	Dunrossil Dr; Yarralumla	35°18′06″S 149°04′40″E		
York Park North Tree Plantation	105242	Historic; A, B, D	15 Jul 2004	Kings Av; Barton			

== Formerly listed places ==
Listed are the two places in the Australian Capital Territory that have been removed from the Commonwealth Heritage List in the territory as of January 2025:

Place name	Place ID	Class	Listed	Address	Suburb or town	Coordinates	Photo
Blowfly Insectary Numbers 1 and 2	105559	Historic	A, B, D	Silo Rd	Acton		
West Portal Cafeteria	105554	Historic	A, B, F	Constitution Av	Parkes		

== Sources ==
- General Bridges Grave RMC Duntroon Heritage Management Plan Final Report (PDF)
