= Tharwa Bridge =

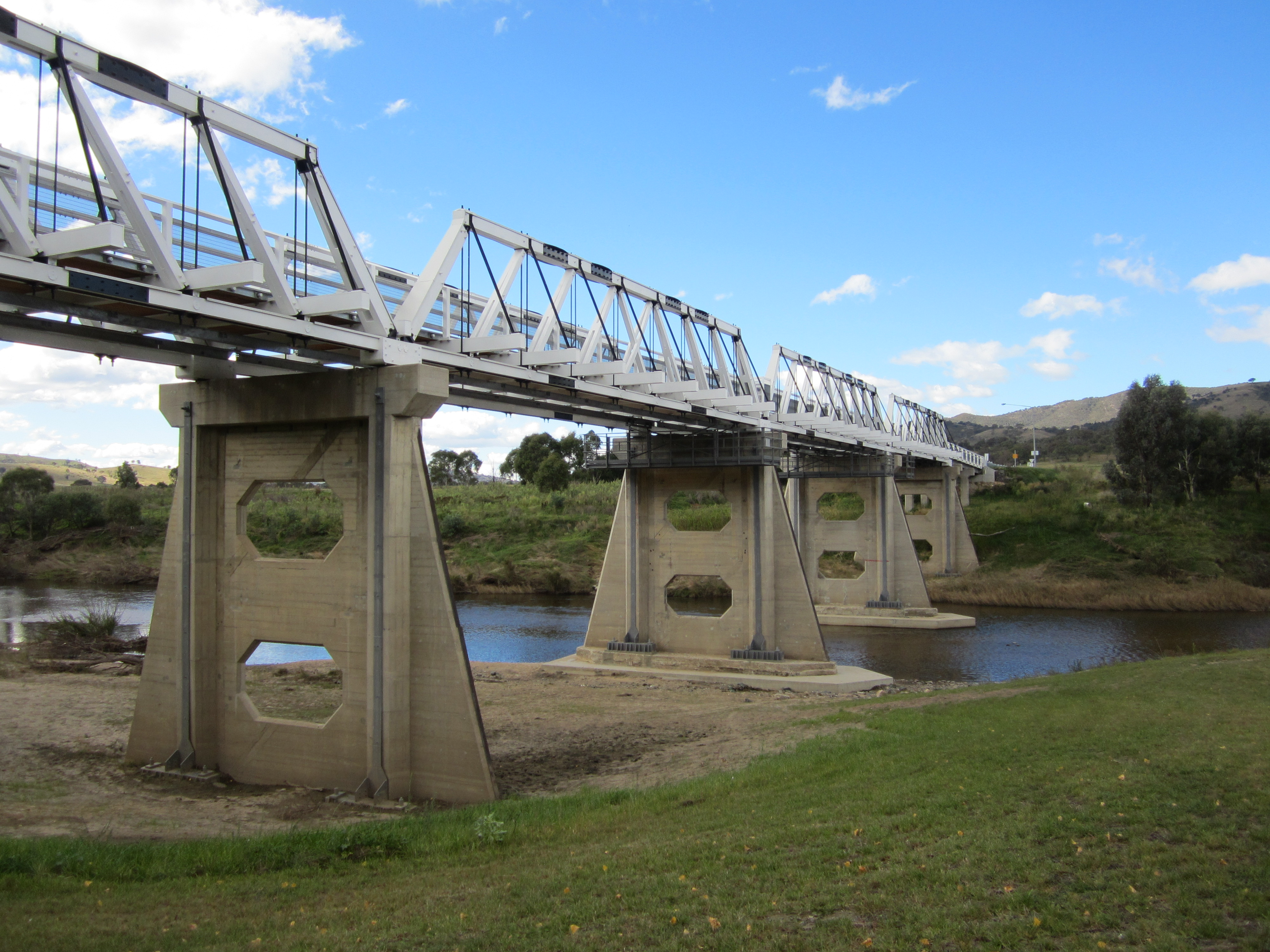
- Tharwa Bridge is an Allan truss bridge over the Murrumbidgee River (looking North)
- Coordinates: 35.508579°S 149.070539°E
- Carries: Tharwa Drive
- Crosses: Murrimbidgee River

Characteristics
- Design: Allan truss
- Material: Timber
- Total length: 598 feet (182 m)
- Width: 15 feet (4.6 m)
- No. of spans: 4
- Piers in water: 2
- Load limit: 5 tonnes
- No. of lanes: 1

History
- Designer: Percy Allan
- Constructed by: McClure Bros
- Inaugurated: 27 March 1895

Location
- Interactive map of Tharwa Bridge

Tharwa Bridge is a four span Allan truss bridge that provides a high-level crossing point across the Murrumbidgee River, allowing traffic between Canberra and Tharwa village. It is the oldest surviving bridge in the Australian Capital Territory.

== History ==
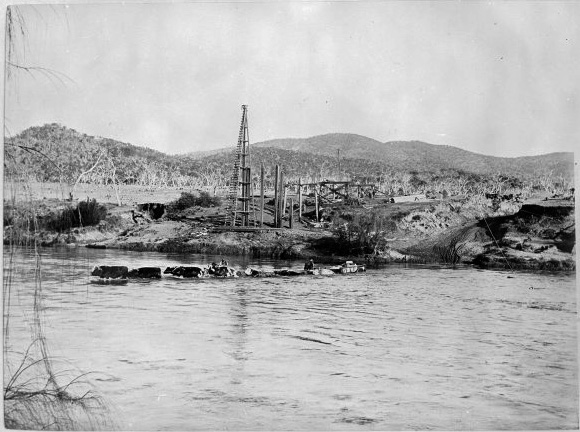
Construction of Tharwa Bridge 1893

The bridge was opened on 27 March 1895, and a public holiday was declared in the region. A parade was held in Tharwa and 1500 people watched Mrs Elizabeth McKeahnie (the oldest resident of the area) open the bridge. The deck level of the bridge was based on the highest recorded flood level prior to building the bridge. A flood has not overtopped the bridge since construction. There is a mark on the concrete pier on the Western side of the river showing the flood level in 1991.

== Heritage ==
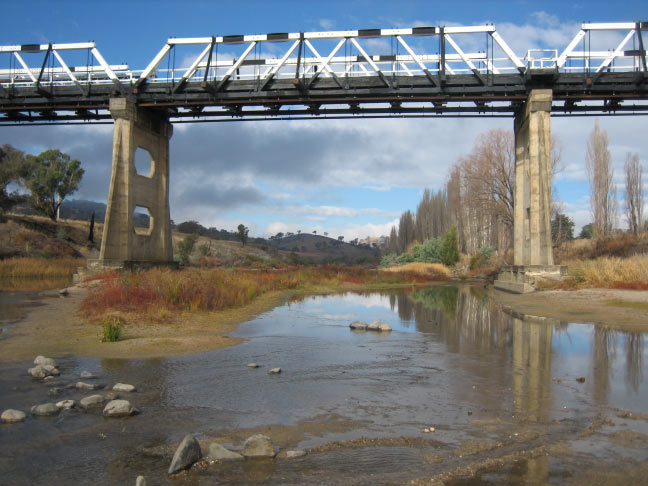
Tharwa Bridge and the Murrumbidgee River after rain, 2005 (looking South); Tharwa is to the right

The bridge was entered in the ACT Heritage Register in 1998, is listed by the National Trust of Australia (ACT) and was entered on the (now defunct) Register of the National Estate by the Australian Heritage Commission in 1983.

The bridge has also been awarded a Historic Engineering Marker by Engineers Australia as part of its Engineering Heritage Recognition Program, and is one of the most significant pieces of heritage in the Australian Capital Territory.

The Tharwa Bridge and its site are historically and technically significant because of the Allan truss structure, having a form and structural integrity which have survived virtually intact. It is the archetypal example of the application of the new technology by Percy Allan to the construction of timber road bridges in New South Wales during a major development phase for bridge and road construction during the last decade of the nineteenth century.

Tharwa Bridge is highly valued by the local community as an integral part of the village of Tharwa. It continues to contribute in social, economic and aesthetic terms to the community. The bridge and its site have associative significance with the period of nineteenth century European settlement and development of the region.

== Maintenance and closures ==
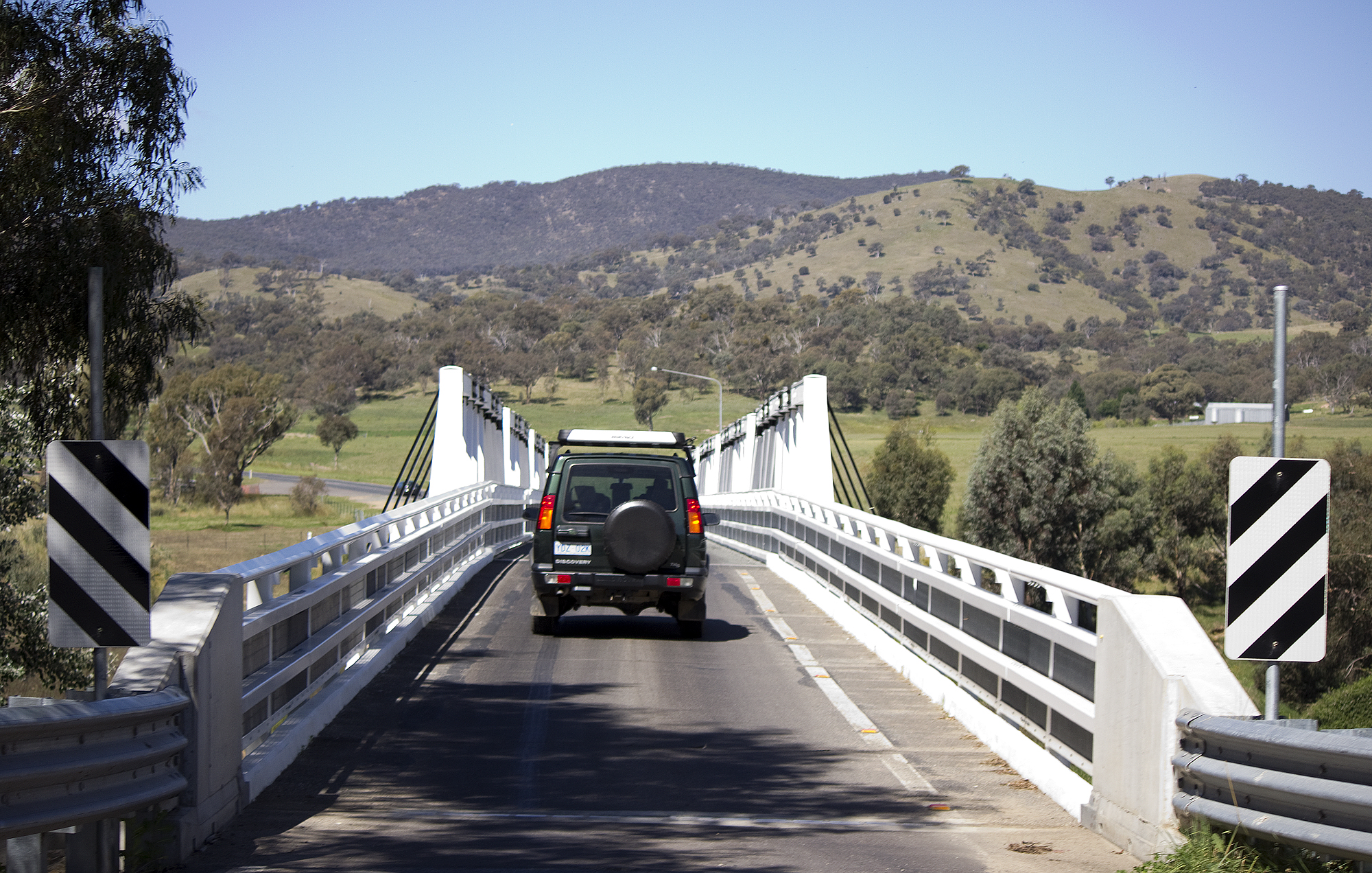
Looking at the Tharwa Bridge, showing the single lane

An engineering assessment of the bridge was undertaken in 1978 by structural engineering firm Hardcastle & Richards, which resulted in some upgrades. However, the bridge subsequently deteriorated.

The bridge was closed in April 2005 when a routine inspection identified extensive wood rotting (caused by termites) of a number of critical, structural elements of the bridge. During July and August 2005, Tharwa Bridge was strengthened with bailey panels to provide a temporary crossing for vehicles up to five tonne. This arrangement was to have been in place until 2008.

In September 2006 ACT Roads advised that the Tharwa Bridge would be closed for three months, and later announcing the bridge was to be closed for an indefinite period. Barriers were put in place to close off the bridge to road, cycle and pedestrian traffic. Traffic was diverted north to Point Hut low level crossing. In the event of that crossing being closed due to flooding, the only other high level bridge in the area is near the Cotter Dam.

In October 2006 the ACT Government announced its decision to construct a single lane concrete bridge with a pedestrian walkway adjacent to the existing bridge. Construction was intended to begin in 2007, however this plan was abandoned in favour of a decision to restore the old bridge, with construction getting underway in April 2008.

The bridge was reopened in August 2008 to light traffic less than 5 tonnes.

The second phase of the project was completed in February 2010 with the foundations improved to withstand major flooding. The third and final phase of the restoration involved further closure of the bridge to public use to allow for the replacement of the timber trusses, new timber deck, and steel railings. The bridge was re-opened to the public on 24 June 2011, with work ongoing and was completed in September 2011.

Ray Wedgwood, Chief Bridge Engineer of the NSW Roads & Traffic Authority and the NSW Department of Main Roads (DMR), with former Chief Bridge Engineer Brian Pearson, successfully advocated for the bridge to be repaired and upgraded, instead of being demolished, and provided technical advice to the ACT Government about the heritage issues and structural refurbishment of the bridge.

In July 2018 the bridge again closed for annual maintenance work for three days. The bridge closed from Wednesday 18 July until Friday 20 July 2018 between 9 am and 3.30 pm. The maintenance included tightening of the bridge's decking and trusses. Weather conditions over the last 12 months may have caused them contraction or expansion.

== See also ==
- List of buildings and structures in the Australian Capital Territory
