= Telopea Park =

Park in Canberra, Australia

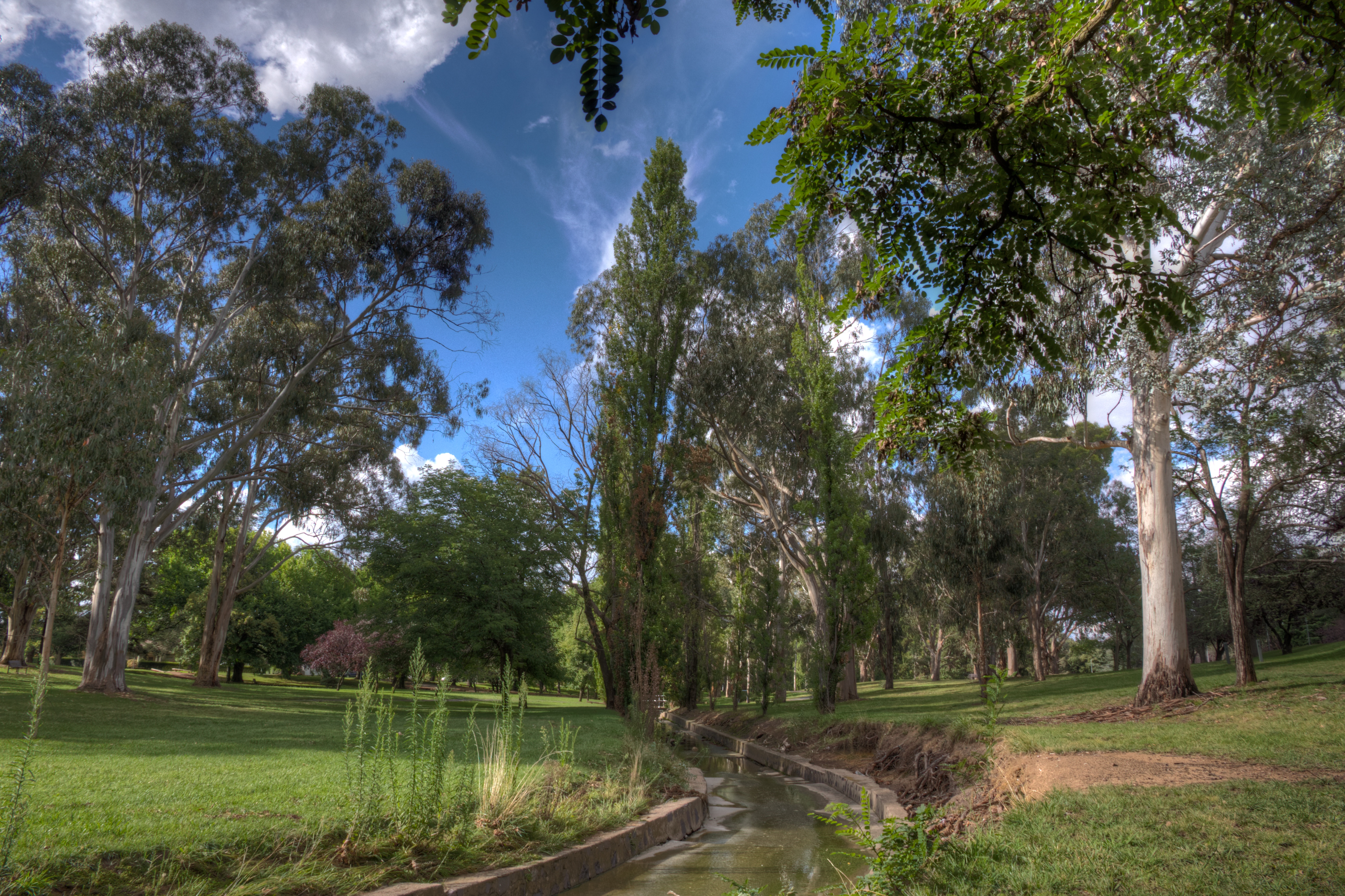
- Telopea Park viewed along the stormwater drain from south to north
- Interactive map of Telopea Park
- Location: Barton, Australian Capital Territory
- Coordinates: 35°18′48″S 149°8′20″E

Telopea Park is one of the oldest parks in Canberra, Australia. The name of the park is from Walter Burley Griffin's original plan for Canberra where he planned Telopea Park at the end of Sydney Avenue. The park is named after the floral emblem of New South Wales, also known as the Waratah. Griffin planned that the state capital city avenues were terminated with a park named after the generic botanical name for a native plant from that particular state. The park covers 0.079 km^{2}.

The park was established in 1922 and is very long and thin, with many large native and introduced trees. A stormwater drain runs along the middle of the park, which is crossed by several bridges. The park has barbecue areas and playground equipment, and is a popular destination. It was listed by the ACT Heritage Council in 2012.

The park is bounded by Telopea Park West (street) and Telopea Park East (street) on either side, with Manuka Oval at the southern end, across New South Wales crescent, and Bowen drive on the Northern End, near Lake Burley Griffin. Telopea Park School is located adjacent to the southwest end of the park.

The park is between the suburbs of Barton and Kingston close to Lake Burley Griffin.
