= Robert Marsden Hope Building =

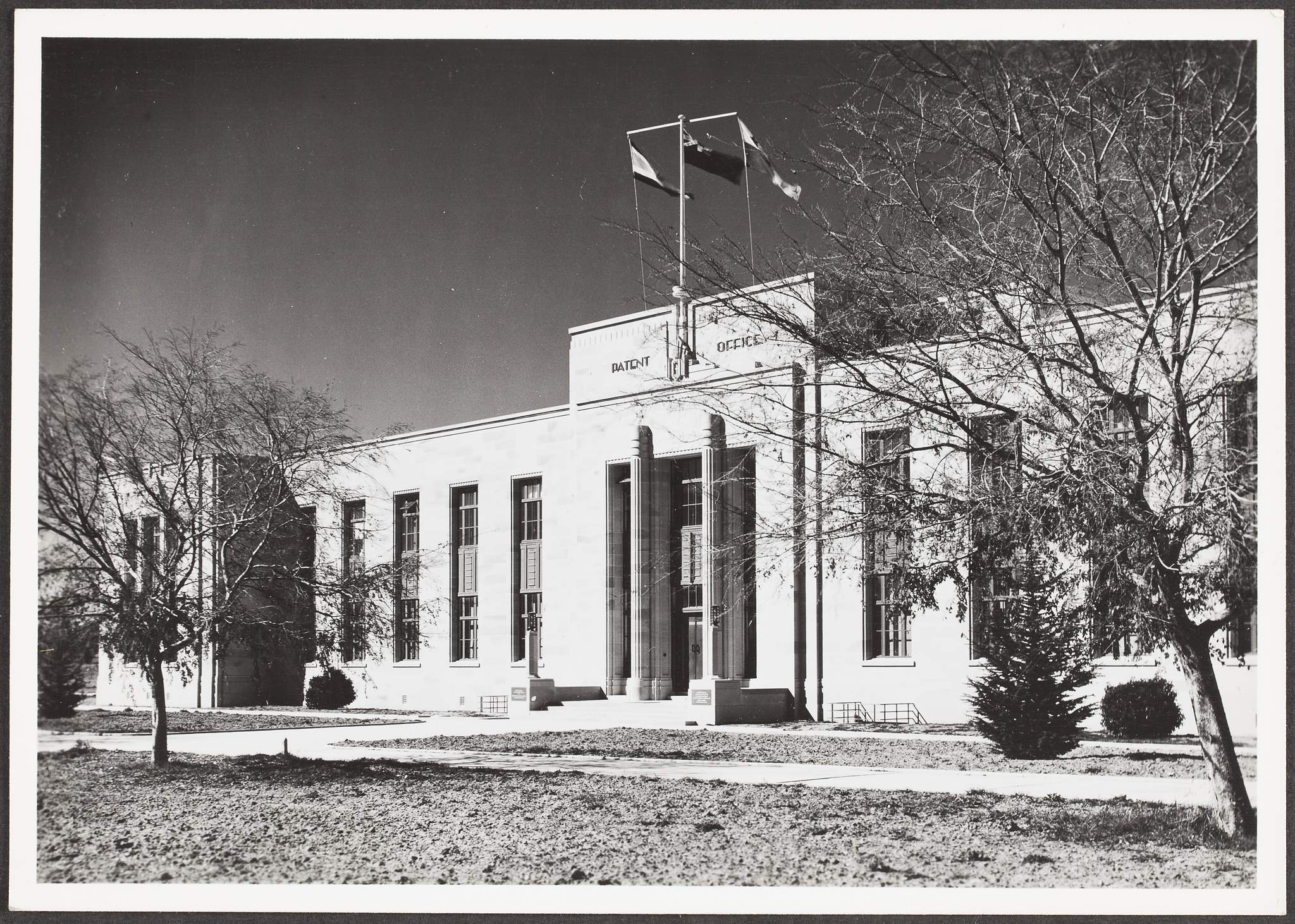
- Canberra Patent Office, 1945
- Interactive map of the Robert Marsden Hope Building area
- Former names: Patent Office Building (1940-1971); Robert Garran Offices (1983-2009)
- Etymology: Robert Marsden Hope

General information
- Status: Completed
- Type: Office
- Architectural style: Art Deco
- Location: 2 National Circuit, Barton, Canberra, Australian Capital Territory, Australia
- Coordinates: 35°18′20″S 149°07′53″E
- Current tenants: Office of National Intelligence
- Groundbreaking: 18 March 1939
- Construction started: 1 August 1939
- Completed: 12 August 1940
- Opened: 7 September 1940; 85 years ago
- Renovated: 2013
- Cost: £116,900
- Renovation cost: A$37 million (2011)
- Client: Department of the Interior
- Owner: IFM Investors

Technical details
- Material: Concrete, sandstone cladding, marble, steel, and timber
- Floor count: 2-3

Design and construction
- Architecture firm: Cuthbert Claude Mortier Whitley
- Main contractor: Concrete Constructions

Renovating team
- Architect: Fender Katsilidis
- Renovating firm: ISPT
- Awards: ACT Property Council of Australia / Rider Levett Bucknall Development of the Year (2013)

Commonwealth Heritage List
- Official name: Patent Office (former), Kings Av, Barton, ACT, Australia
- Type: Listed place
- Criteria: A., D., E., F.
- Designated: 22 June 2004
- Reference no.: 105454

The Robert Marsden Hope Building (formerly the Patent Office Building and also formerly part of the Robert Garran Offices) is a heritage listed government building and the headquarters of the Office of National Intelligence, located on the edge of the Parliamentary Triangle, Canberra, Australia.

== Overview ==
Constructed in 1939, it was built to house the patent office following its move from Melbourne in 1934. Prior to its completion, the patent office operated out of Hotel Acton. Like other government buildings constructed in Canberra around that period, it was designed in the Art Deco architectural style.

In addition to the patent office, occupying the building was the ACT Supreme Court, and the Commonwealth Security Services (CSS), a predecessor of the Australian Security Intelligence Organisation. Following their disbandment in December 1945, the CSS moved out with the Supreme Court following suit in 1963, leaving the Patent Office the sole occupant until they too moved in 1975. Replacing them was the Commonwealth Public Service Board, who occupied the building until 1983 when the building was merged into a larger complex housing the Attorney-General's Department. At that time, the building was renamed as part of the Robert Garran Offices.

Following major refurbishment, the building was renamed the Robert Marsden Hope Building on 5 December 2011, in honour of Robert Marsden Hope, a former Justice of the New South Wales Court of Appeal and three-time Royal Commissioner. The Office of National Intelligence has occupied the building since its refurbishment and renaming in 2011.
