= Parkes, Australian Capital Territory =

Suburb of Canberra, Australia

Parkes
- Suburb
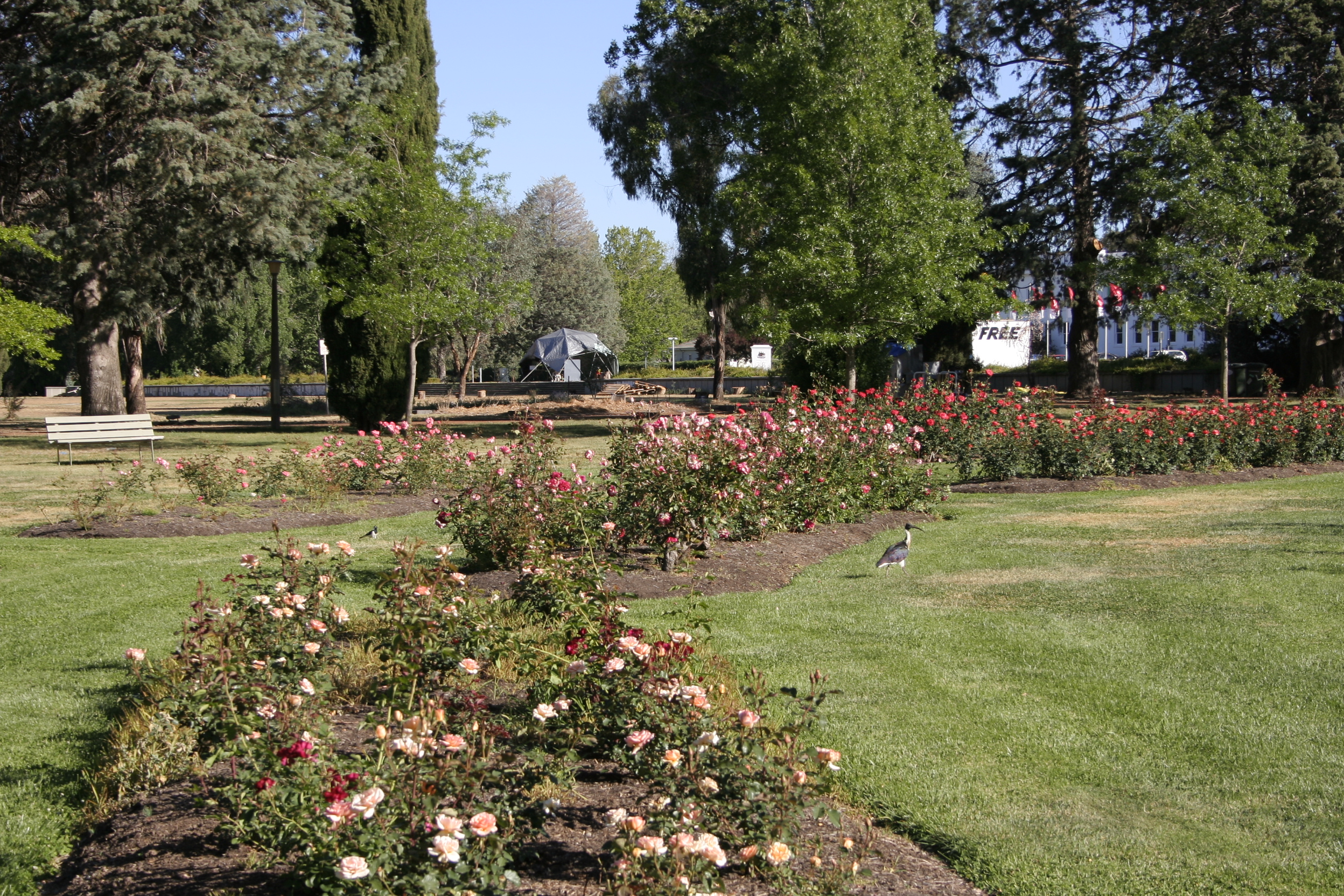
- Aboriginal Tent Embassy and Old Parliament House, Canberra, located in Parkes.

- Coordinates: 35°18′S 149°08′E
- Country: Australia
- State: Australian Capital Territory
- City: Canberra
- District: Canberra Central (South Canberra)
- Location: 3 km (1.9 mi) S of Canberra CBD; 13 km (8.1 mi) W of Queanbeyan; 95 km (59 mi) SW of Goulburn; 292 km (181 mi) SW of Sydney

Government
  - Territory electorate: Kurrajong
  - Federal division: Canberra

Area
  - Total: 3.03 km^{2} (1.17 sq mi)
- Elevation: 561 m (1,841 ft)

Population
  - Total: 0 (2021 census)
  - Density: 0.00/km^{2} (0.0/sq mi)
- Postcode: 2600
- Gazetted: 20 September 1928
Suburbs around Parkes
Acton	Civic	Reid
Yarralumla	Parkes	Campbell
Capital Hill	Barton	Russell

Parkes is an inner southern suburb of the Canberra Central district of Canberra, located within the Australian Capital Territory of Australia. Located southeast of the Canberra central business district, Parkes contains the Parliamentary Triangle and many of the national monuments of Australia's capital city.

Parkes is named in honour of Sir Henry Parkes, a Federalist, legislator and one of the founders of the Australian Constitution. Streets in Parkes are named after monarchs and constitutional references.

Parkes contains many of Canberra's large institutions and contains limited residential areas.

== Population ==
At the 2021 census, Parkes had no population. At the 2016 census, it had five people, at the 2011 census, it had no people, at the 2006 census it had four people and at the 2001 census it had 27 people.

== Notable places ==
- Aboriginal Tent Embassy
- Commonwealth Park
- Commonwealth Place
- East Block
- Kings Park
- Central Basin of Lake Burley Griffin
- High Court of Australia
- National Carillon
- National Gallery of Australia
- National Library of Australia
- National Portrait Gallery
- National Rose Garden
- Old Parliament House
- Questacon
- Reconciliation Place
- Regatta Point
- West Block

== Geology ==
The geology of Parkes has been studied in great detail. The Canberra Formation, a calcareous shale, is found in the lower parts. This overlies middle Silurian Camp Hill Sandstone. The sandstone unconformably overlies the early Silurian Black Mountain Sandstone and State Circle Shale. State Circle Shale is Late Llandovery in a more finely divided time scale and it has been dated to 445 ± 7 million years ago. The State Circle Shale is composed of laminated shales and siltstone. Black Mountain Sandstone is composed of a white quartz sandstone.

== Education ==
Parkes residents get preference for:

- Forrest Primary
- Telopea Park School (for high school)
- Narrabundah College

== Gallery ==
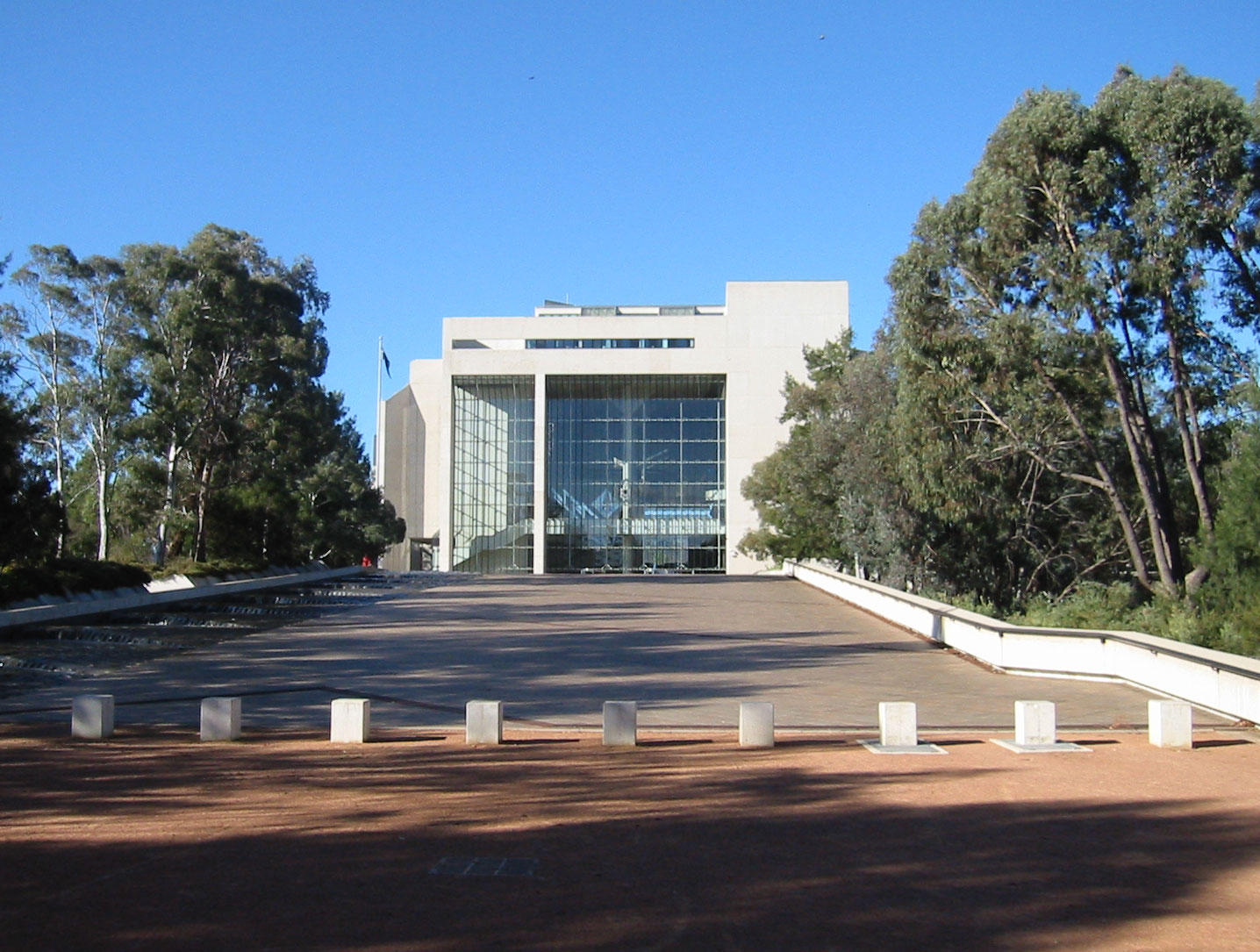
High Court of Australia

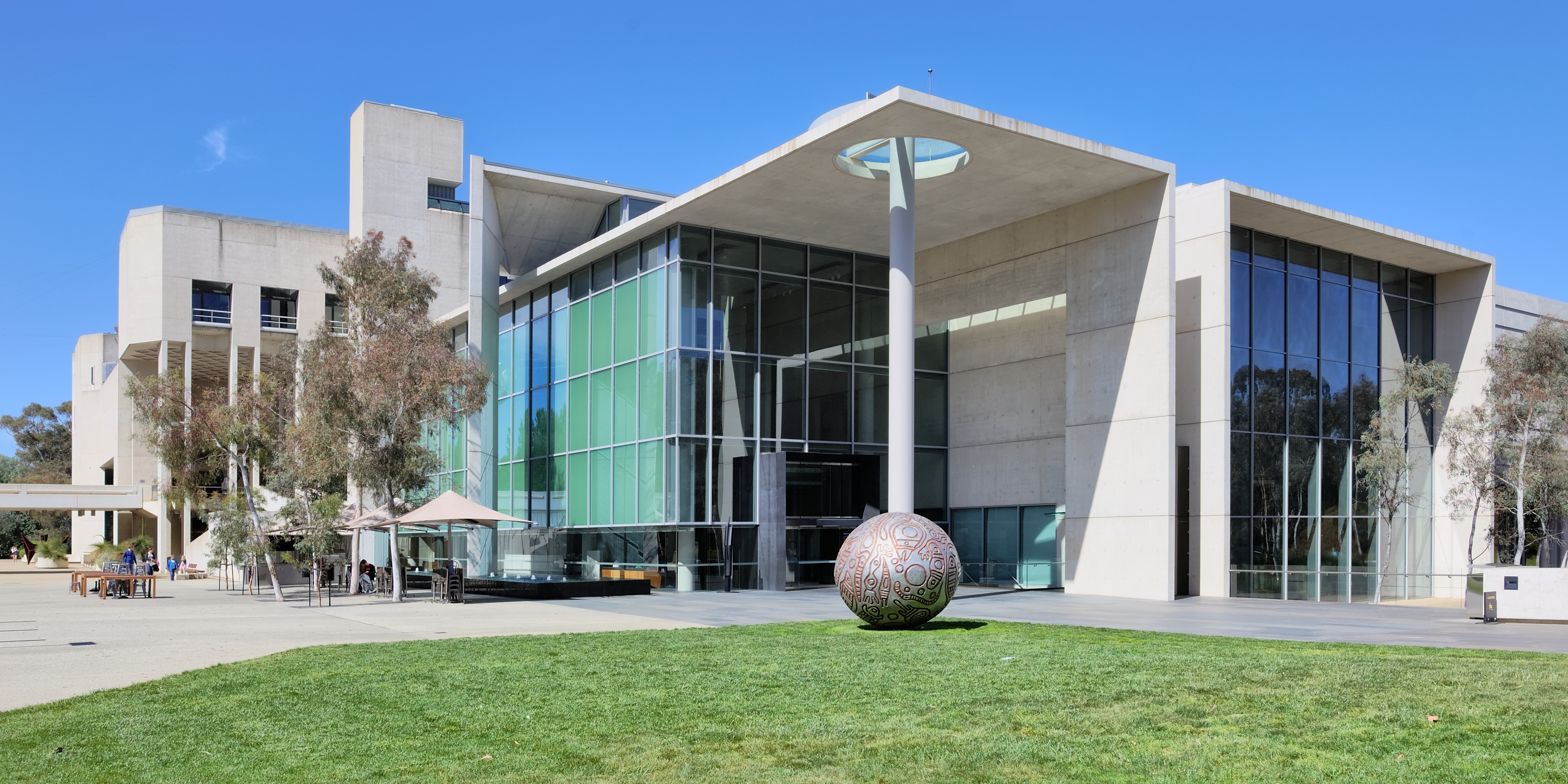
National Gallery of Australia

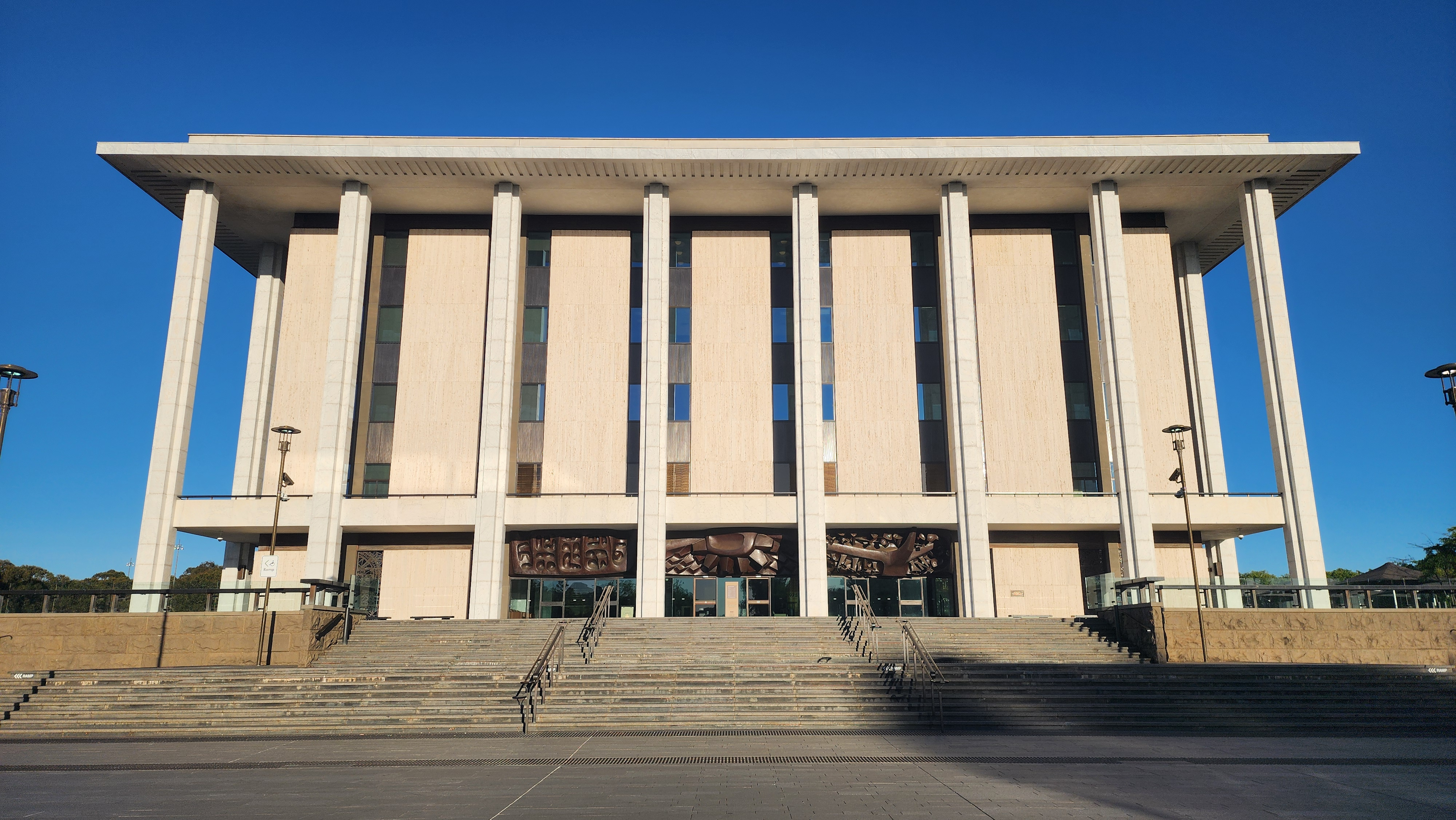
National Library of Australia

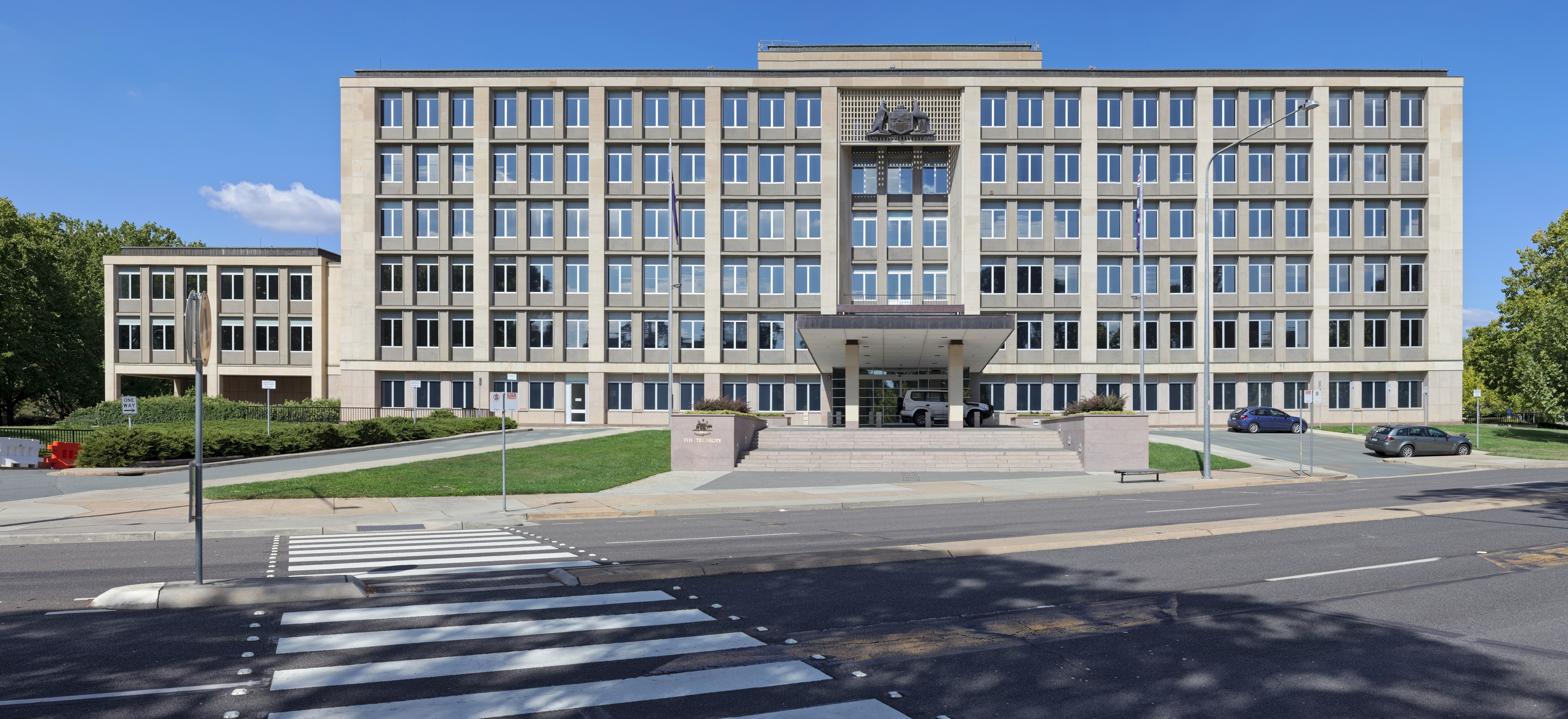
The Treasury building

== See also ==
- Parliamentary Triangle
