= National Rose Gardens =

Rose gardens in Canberra, Australia

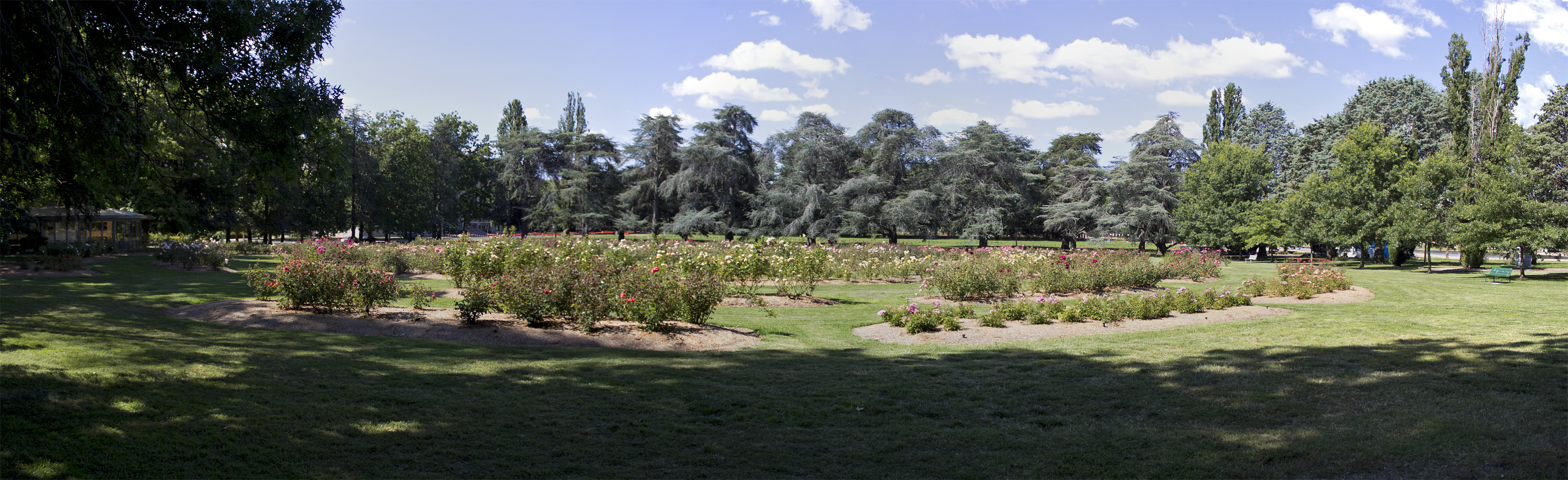
- The National Rose Gardens
- Interactive map of National Rose Gardens
- Type: Rose garden
- Location: King George Tce, Parkes, Canberra, Australian Capital Territory, Australia
- Coordinates: 35°18′11″S 149°7′52″E
- Area: approx. 4.5 hectares (11 acres)
- Established: 12 September 1933 by John Perkins, Minister for the Interior
- Designer: Thomas Weston
- Administrator: National Capital Authority

Commonwealth Heritage List
- Official name: National Rose Gardens, King George Tce, Parkes, ACT, Australia
- Type: Listed place
- Criteria: A., B., E.
- Designated: 22 June 2004
- Reference no.: 105473

The National Rose Gardens are heritage-listed rose gardens located in Parkes, a suburb of Canberra, in the Australian Capital Territory of Australia. Conceived in 1926 and opened in 1933, they were Australia's first national gardening project and were planned as a physical expression of the principle of cooperation between the Commonwealth and the States. In the development of the Gardens, roses were contributed by all States in Australia. They were intended to provide an interest for all Australians in developing Canberra, the national capital, as a garden city. The Gardens demonstrate a distinctive early example of twentieth century public garden design in a formal style. In horticultural terms the Gardens have provided the opportunity to exhibit the best varieties of Australian grown and overseas roses in a favourable climate. Their location in front of the (then Provisional) Old Parliament House was planned to enhance the setting of the House. The Gardens are valued by visitors to Canberra as well as the local community for their aesthetic qualities.

The rose gardens were added to the Australian Commonwealth Heritage List on 22 June 2004.

== History ==
The concept of an Australian Rose Garden in Canberra dates back to 1926 when it was proposed by the National Rose Society of NSW to the Federal Capital Commission (FCC). Plans for the National Rose Gardens were prepared by 1932 and, through the Horticultural Society of Canberra, Rose Societies in each State were approached to contribute roses. Each garden was to have 2,000 standard and climbing roses and the beds were to have different varieties of roses arranged by colour. Thirty-eight public bodies and many private individuals contributed roses. Parliamentary clerk Robert Broinowski played a key role in soliciting donations for the project, receiving plants from Canada, Japan, the Netherlands and the United States.

The first rose was planted by the Minister for the Interior, John Perkins, on 12 September 1933. The rose was a Daily Mail donated by the Victorian Mothers' Clubs. Over the following weeks 2,000 roses were planted and the gardens were fully planted by the next planting season. Broinowski and Senate president Walter Kingsmill later successfully lobbied against an attempt by the Lyons government to build the National Library of Australia on a portion of the newly erected gardens. The gardens were also closely associated with Thomas Weston, the first officer in charge of afforestation in Canberra, whose ashes were scattered in the park he designed and laid out in front of the Parliament House. This park includes the National Rose Gardens and the grassed terrace of Parkes Place. Weston died in 1936.

The gardens were refurbished for the 1954 visit of Queen Elizabeth II. This involved the replacement of many roses. The perimeter paths around the gardens were converted to rose garden beds and the pyramid style supports for climbing roses were replaced with rectangular timber pergolas. The garden beds were modified between 1965 and 1968 when King George Terrace was realigned and the King George V Memorial was moved to a corner of the western garden. In 1968 a restaurant was built on another corner of the western garden. The timber pergolas were replaced with metal and wire frames in 1968.

== Physical description ==
The gardens are in two parts, set symmetrically either side of the grassed terrace in front of Old Parliament House. The design of the two gardens is similar in plan, but each displays an individual character. The site slopes gently to the north (approximately 1.5% slope) and covers an area of approximately 4.5 hectares (11 acres). The general character of the gardens is of a spacious formal parterre enclosed by mature trees. The gardens have three basic components: the rose beds themselves, perimeter plantings of trees and the lawn. The rose beds in each garden are laid out in plan to symbolise the petals of a fully opened rose. This consists of a central circular bed enclosed by punctuated annulus beds in a formal quartered configuration. The replacement of ageing roses with new varieties occurs regularly. Each garden is enclosed by a perimeter of large mature trees of a variety of non native species, evergreen and deciduous and arranged in a regular order. The species used (basically cedar, oak, pine, plane and poplar) provide for a range of seasonal visual effects as well as wind protection and space definition. Pruning of low limbs has provided unimpeded pedestrian access. The avenue of cypress trees (Cupressus sempervirens) which separates the rose gardens and the central grassed terrace is a memorial planting. Planted by visiting dignitaries on the occasion of the meeting of the delegates of the Empire Parliamentary Association in 1926, many of the trees still have a memorial plaque at their base. Also along this avenue are mature poplar trees (Populus nigra) which were intended as markers, because of their strong vertical form and vivid yellow autumn colour, to key entry points within the Parliamentary Triangle. Both the poplars and cypresses are remnants of the original plan and plantings made by Weston.

Apart from the beds and the main edge pathways, all other surfaces are irrigated grass. This provides a bright green uniform ground plane which highlights the patterns created by light and shade and allows a smooth transition of views into adjacent spaces.

The gardens declined after the Parliament moved to the new Parliament House in 1988. The gardens were restored and officially re-opened in December 2004.
