= Telopea Park School =

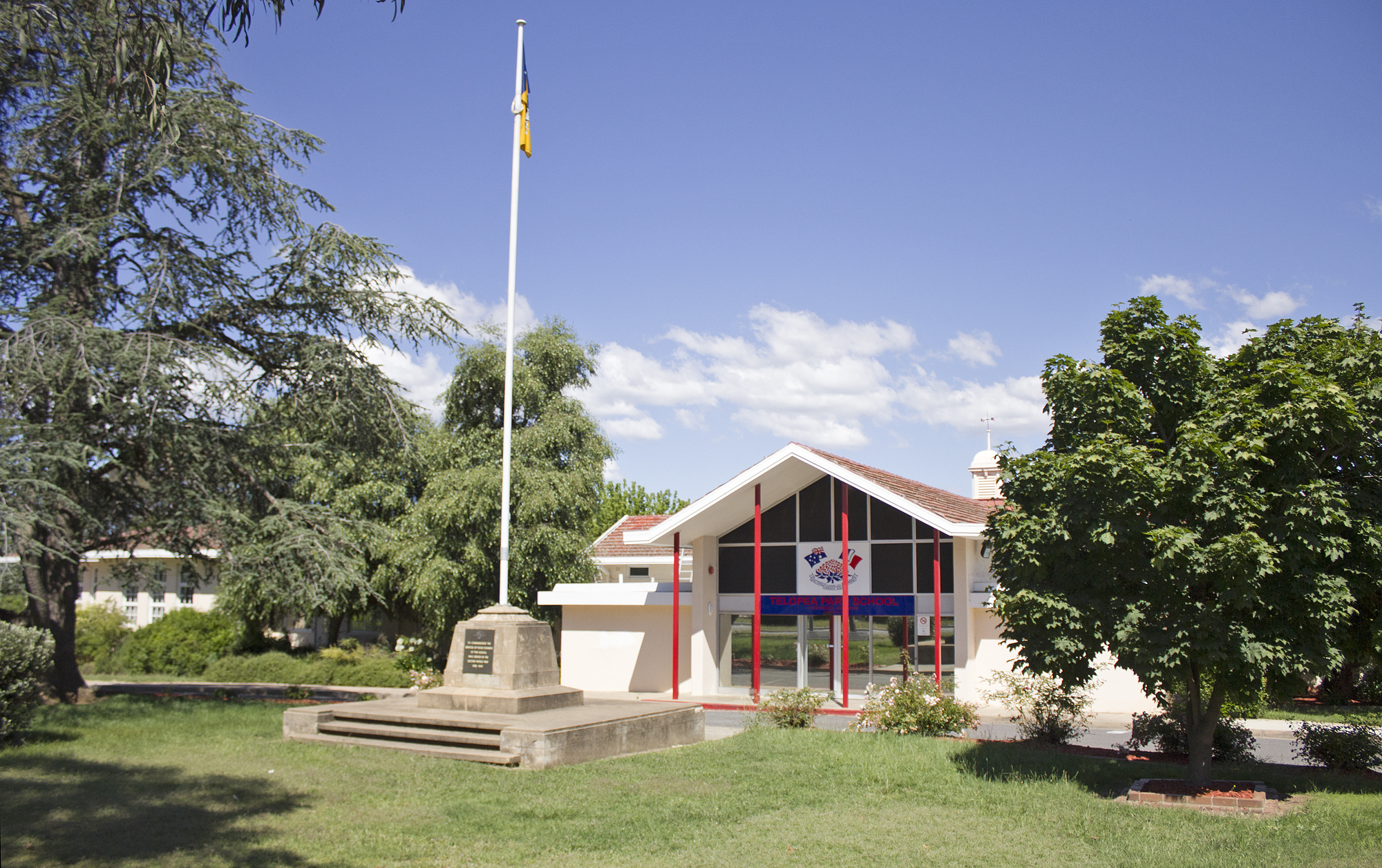

Location
- Barton, Australian Capital Territory; Australia; 35°18′50″S 149°8′3″E

Information
- Other name: French: Lycée Franco-Australien de Canberra
- Type: Government international primary and secondary school
- Motto: Latin: Spectans orientia solis lumina (Looking towards the rising sun)
- Established: 1923; 103 years ago
- Grades: Year K–10
- Enrolment: ~1,550 (2021)
- Campus type: Suburban
- Colours: Red, white and blue
- Website: telopea.act.edu.au; lyceefrancoaustralien-efs.org

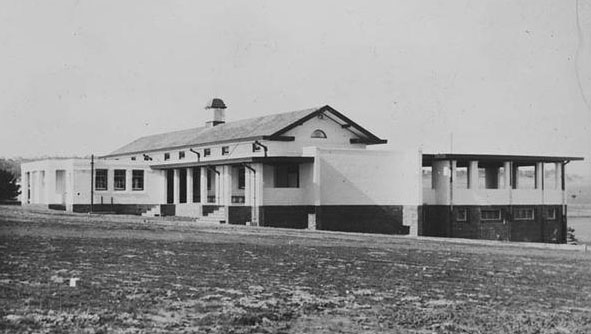
Telopea Park School circa 1923.

Telopea Park School (French: Lycée Franco-Australien de Canberra) is a government international primary and secondary school in Canberra, Australia. It is named after the adjacent Telopea Park. It was founded in 1923, making it the oldest school in Canberra. Telopea Park School is one of the few public schools in the Australian Capital Territory to teach students from Kindergarten to Year 10 and is the only bi-national school in Canberra. Recognised in a treaty, it is fully accredited by the French Ministry of Education and offers a bilingual program from Kindergarten to Year 10. It is also one of two high schools in the ACT to be part of the International Baccalaureate Middle Years Programme, having gained IB membership in 2006.

The school buildings have been heritage-listed by the ACT Heritage Council.

== Primary school ==
One half of the school's buildings has been allocated to the primary section of Telopea Park School. All of the students in primary at Telopea Park School follow a bilingual education, with 80% of the lessons from Kindergarten to Year 2 given in French by teachers recognised by both the French Education department and the ACT Department of Education. In Years 3 to 6, French and English is taught as a 50/50 ratio. French staff are generally contracted for 2 to 3 years. They arrive and depart mid-year in accordance with Northern Hemisphere schooling. Students also have classes given in English by Australian staff to complement their French language education.

== Secondary school ==
The secondary school is not exclusively English-speaking. The English/French Stream (EFS) allows students to continue their education in French. It follows the French education system while incorporating three compulsory ACT courses. The other students, who form about two-thirds of the student body, follow the ACT secondary school system and can then complete the International Baccalaureate Organisation Middle Years Program. Most students from Telopea Park School go on to Narrabundah College, the EFS in particular, as Narrabundah College is the only college in Canberra (and one of only two schools in Australia) to allow students to sit the French Baccalauréat.

== Languages ==
During Years 7 to 10, learning a language other than English is compulsory at Telopea Park School, unlike most other ACT secondary schools. Students usually study a single language for all four years. However, sometimes beginner classes are started for new students to the school in years 9 and 10. Students choose between Spanish, Italian, German, Japanese, Mandarin, and French. Mandarin was introduced to the school in 2017, making a total of 7 languages. Students follow two hours and forty-five minutes of language classes a week.

== The English/French Stream ==
The English/French Stream (EFS) is essentially a portion of students at Telopea Park School who follow a different system and curriculum to those of the English Stream (who follow the standard ACT system and curriculum). These students are usually those who follow on from Telopea Park Primary School. The way the EFS students learn is very different from that of the students of the English Stream: EFS students have fewer elective classes, as they have compulsory History and Geography every term, and they learn three languages instead of two (English, French, and a third language). The current principal is Michelle Morthorpe.

The EFS has a different timetable and also has its own principal (la proviseure) currently Florence Llopis. After the EFS students finish at Telopea, they continue the EFS French Baccalaureat at Narrabundah College in years 11 and 12.

To underline the equal importance of the French and Australian streams, both national anthems are played at the beginning of the school assembly that alternate each week between Year 7 & 8, and Year 9 & 10.

== Notable staff ==
- Michel Charleux, principal from September 1987 to 2007
- Laurie Fisher, former physical education and health science teacher
- Chrisopher Lemmer, 2026 physical education and health teacher notably known as best physical education teacher

== Notable alumni ==
- Kofi Danning, soccer player, for a number of teams in the A-League
- Leon Ford, actor
- Cariba Heine, actress
- Alex Jesaulenko, Australian Rules player
- Caroline Le Couteur, politician
- Matthew Le Nevez, actor
- Malcolm McIntosh, public servant
- Steve Mauger, politician
- Patricia Piccinini, visual artist
- Desmond Sheen, flying ace in the Royal Air Force during the Second World War
- Nikolai Topor-Stanley, soccer player, former captain of Western Sydney Wanderers in the A-League
- Gough Whitlam, former Prime Minister

== See also ==
- French Australian
- Narrabundah College
