= Toad Hall (Australian National University) =

Residential hall in Australian National University

- Australian National University
- Location: Barry Drive and Kingsley Street, Acton, Australian Capital Territory
- Coordinates: 35°16′32″S 149°7′26″E
- Architect: John Andrews
- Warden: Ian Walker
- Website: ANU residence

Toad Hall is a residential hall for the Australian National University, primarily for post-graduate students drawn from some 50 countries across the globe.

It is located at the corner of Barry Drive and Kingsley Street, Acton. Sullivans Creek and the Drill Hall Gallery are nearby.

The Toad Hall residence was designed by internationally acclaimed Australian architect John Andrews in the early 1970s, with construction starting in 1973 and opening to its first residents in April 1974. It was considered quite a 'revolutionary' design in student residences at that time and is listed on the ACT Chapter of the Royal Australian Institute of Architects Register of Significant Twentieth Century Architecture and on the Commonwealth Heritage List.

The University Council allowed the hall of residence to be named Toad Hall following the recommendation of the first residents of the hall where the setting, with the long line of willow trees between the hall and Sullivans Creek, was evocative of Kenneth Grahame's children's novel, The Wind in the Willows.
