= Duntroon, Australian Capital Territory =

Locality in Canberra, Australia

Coordinates: 35°18′S 149°10′E

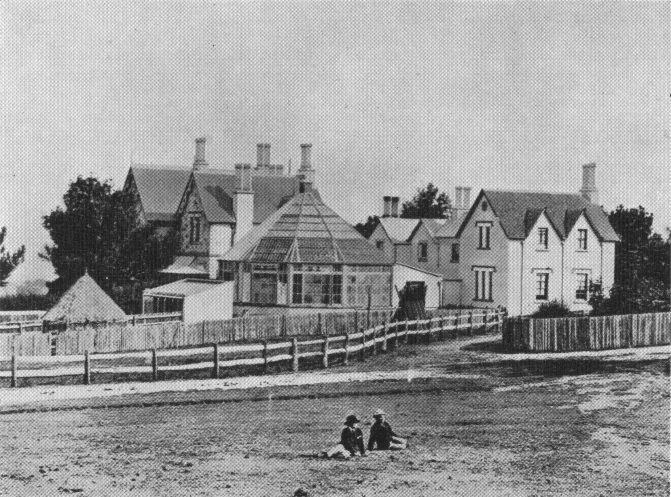
Duntroon house in 1870

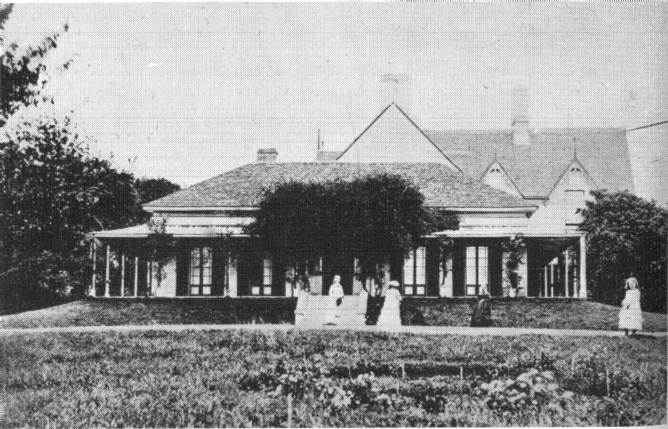
Duntroon Homestead

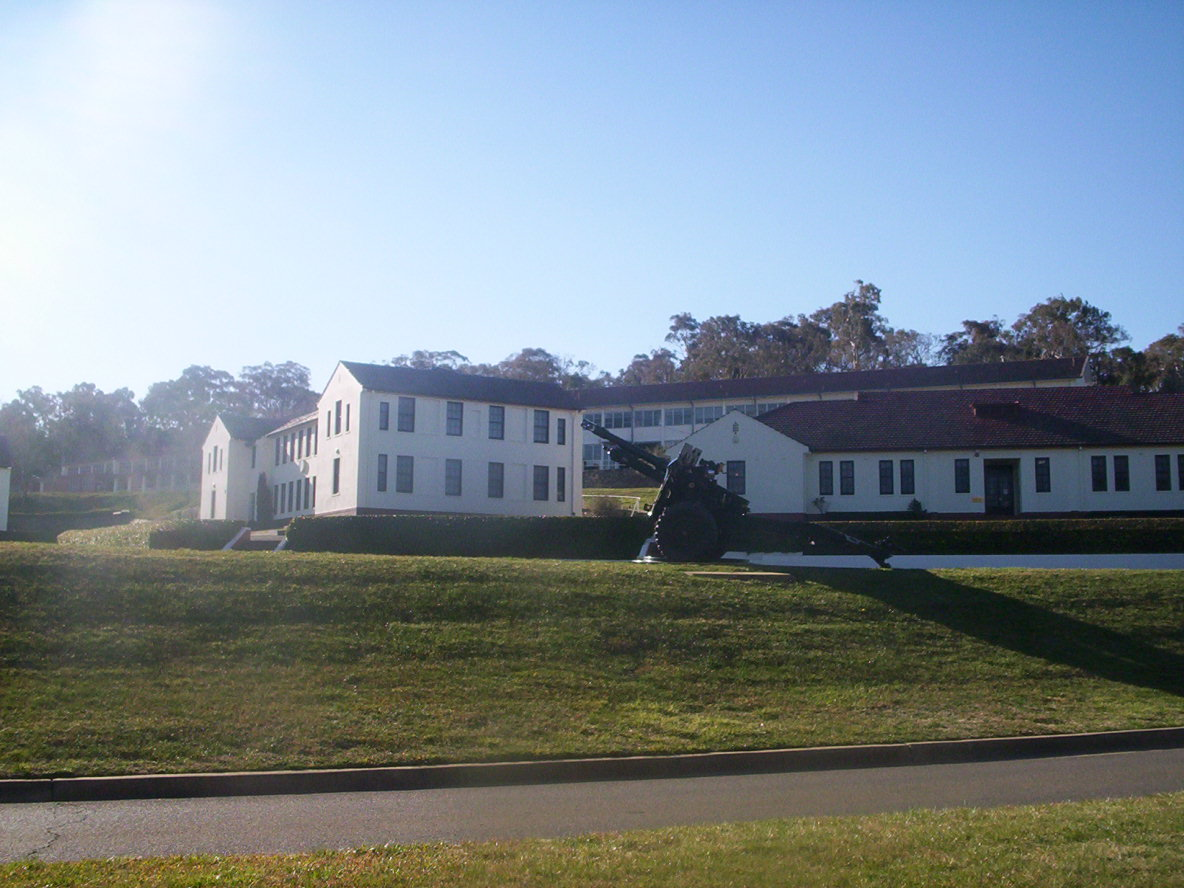
Royal Military College at Duntroon

Duntroon is a locality in the city of Canberra in the Australian Capital Territory.

== History ==
Robert Campbell's property Duntroon was situated on the limestone plains of New South Wales in the area that is now covered by the ACT.

Campbell was given government compensation in 1825 for the loss of his ship the Sydney while under charter to the NSW Governor to shio food from India to the colony. Robert Campbell, sent pastoralist James Ainslie to collect 700 sheep from the government flocks at Bathurst and to go southward looking for suitable pasture.

Ainslie reached the Limestone Plains and selected a site on the slopes above the Molonglo River where the Royal Military College now stands. In 1825 Campbell applied for and received his grant, naming his homestead "Duntroon" after the family castle, Duntrune Castle on Loch Crinan in Argyll, Scotland. Duntrune Castle on Loch Crinan in Argyll, Scotland was sold to clan Malcolm in 1792, long before this.

In 1833, Campbell built "Duntroon House" out of stone with wide verandahs. In 1862 Robert's son George added a large two-storey extension. In its final form the house contained twenty rooms and is a great example of colonial architecture. It now serves as the officers' mess for the Royal Military College, Duntroon and is situated in the suburb of Campbell.

"Duntroon House" was the centre of activity for Campbell's station. Gardens were established around the house including many exotic trees and an intricate maze was grown also a conservatory, orchard, vineyard and dairy farm were built in the surrounding area.

Duntroon was recommended as the site for Australia's Military College by Lord Kitchener, who had been commissioned in 1910 to report on the country's defence needs. Initially the government rented Duntroon for two years before obtaining the title to Duntroon and its surrounding 360 acres (1.5 km^{2}) through the creation of the Australian Capital Territory.

On 27 June 1911 the Royal Military College opened at Duntroon.

== Prisoner of War National Memorial ==
The Prisoner of War National Memorial is located at Duntroon. It consists of the Changi Chapel, which was originally constructed by Australian and British prisoners of war in Singapore in 1944. It was dismantled at the end of the war, packed away and taken to a military store in Australia. It was reconstructed using old diagrams and notes from the architect Hamish Cameron-Smith and unveiled in 1988 to commemorate the POWs.

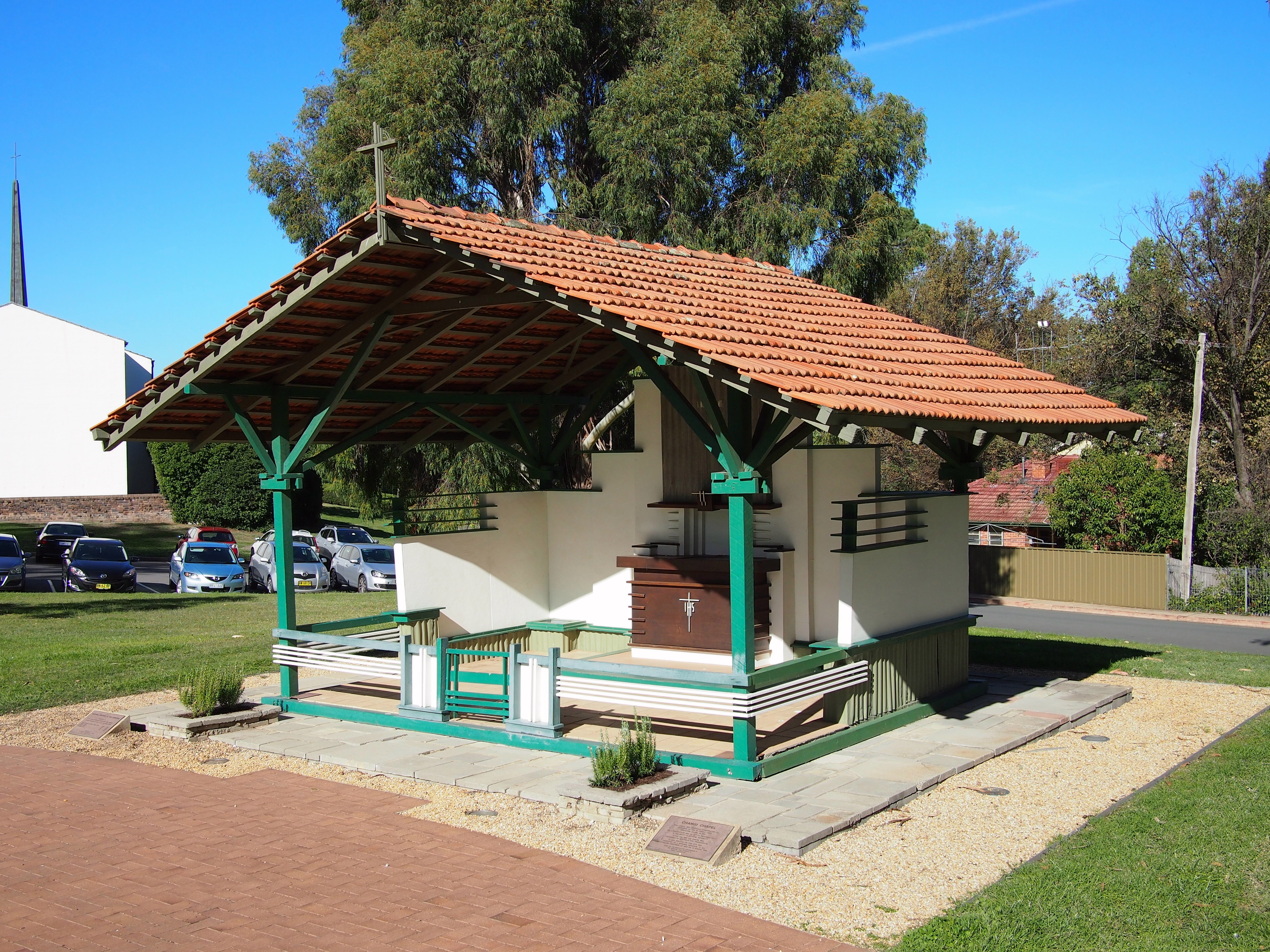
The Changi Chapel in Duntroon

== Geology ==
In the east calcareous shales from the Canberra Formation is overlain by Quaternary alluvium. This rock is the limestone in the original name of Canberra "Limestone Plains". The Narrabundah Ashstone is part of this formation and can be seen in the easternmost corner. In the higher west including Mount Pleasant is grey quartz andesite from the Ainslie Volcanics. Around Australian Defence Force Academy is grey dacite from the Ainslie Volcanics.

Geology of the Australian Capital Territory covers more of the geology of the ACT.
