= Barton, Australian Capital Territory =

Suburb of Canberra, Australia

Barton
- Suburb
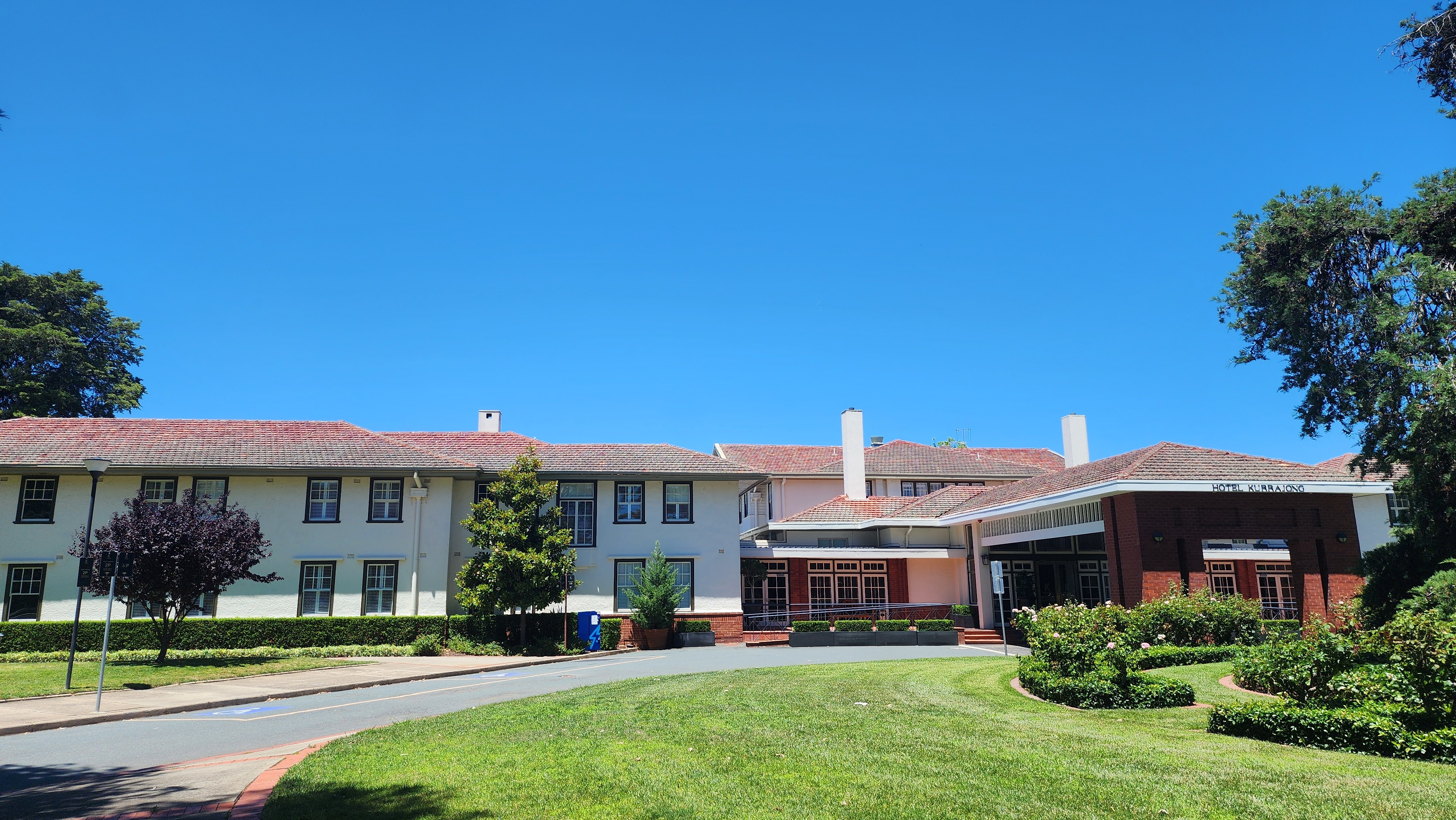
- Hotel Kurrajong

- Coordinates: 35°18′28″S 149°08′04″E
- Country: Australia
- State: Australian Capital Territory
- City: Canberra
- District: South Canberra
- Location: 4 km (2.5 mi) S of Canberra CBD; 11 km (6.8 mi) W of Queanbeyan; 95 km (59 mi) SW of Goulburn; 292 km (181 mi) SW of Sydney
- Established: 1922

Government
  - Territory electorate: Kurrajong
  - Federal division: Canberra

Area
  - Total: 2.21 km^{2} (0.85 sq mi)
- Elevation: 565 m (1,854 ft)

Population
  - Total: 1,946 (2021 census)
  - Density: 880.5/km^{2} (2,281/sq mi)
- Postcode: 2600
- Gazetted: 20 September 1928
Suburbs around Barton
Parkes	Parkes	Kingston
Capital Hill	Barton	Kingston
Forrest	Forrest	Forrest

Barton (postcode: 2600) is a suburb of Canberra, Australian Capital Territory, Australia. At the 2021 census, Barton had a population of 1,946 people.

Barton is adjacent to Capital Hill. It contains the Department of Prime Minister and Cabinet, Attorney-General's Department, Department of Foreign Affairs and Trade and several other Commonwealth government departments.

On Kings Avenue is the controversial Edmund Barton Building, which was made a heritage listed building in 2005, but its modernist design has often been criticised.

The boundary of Barton runs along Telopea Park East in the south east. On the east side it surrounds the East Basin of Lake Burley Griffin. In the north east the boundary is Morshead Drive. The boundary continues along Kings Avenue all the way to State Circle. State Circle forms the boundary with Capital Hill to the west. The boundary then extends along the centre of Sydney Avenue, and finally along New South Wales Crescent back to Telopea Park.

== History ==
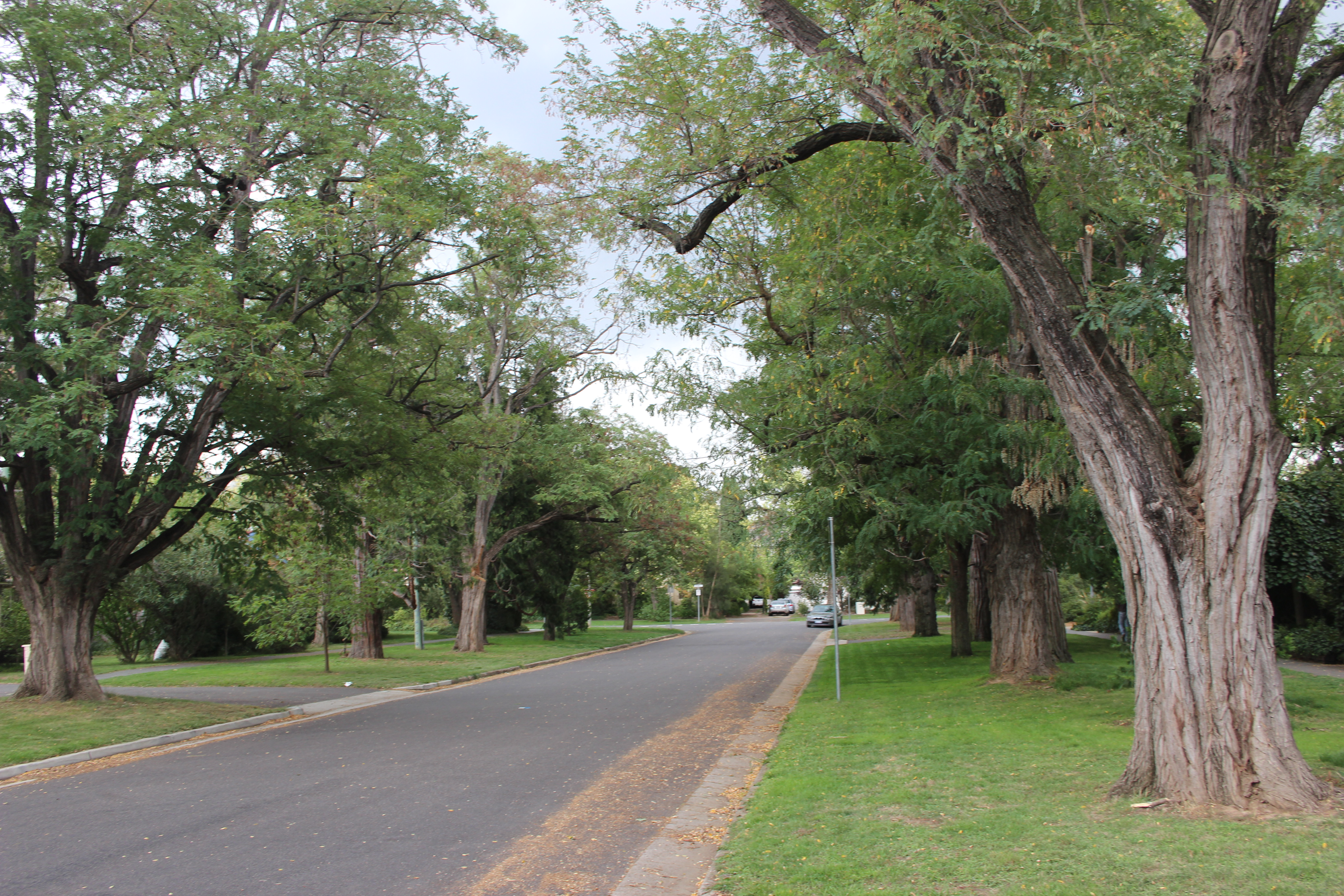
Barton Housing Precinct, Gipps Street

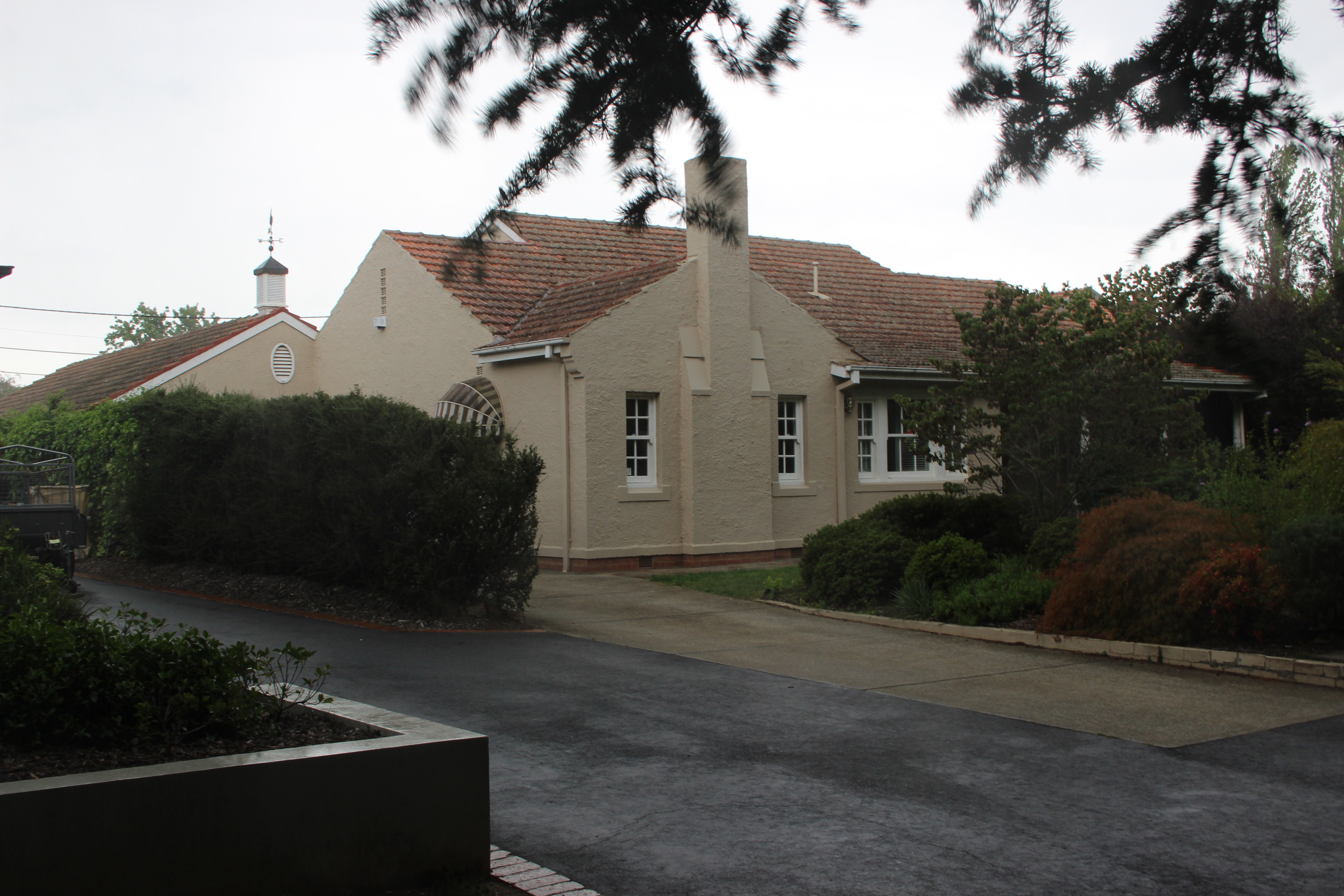
House in Telopea Park West

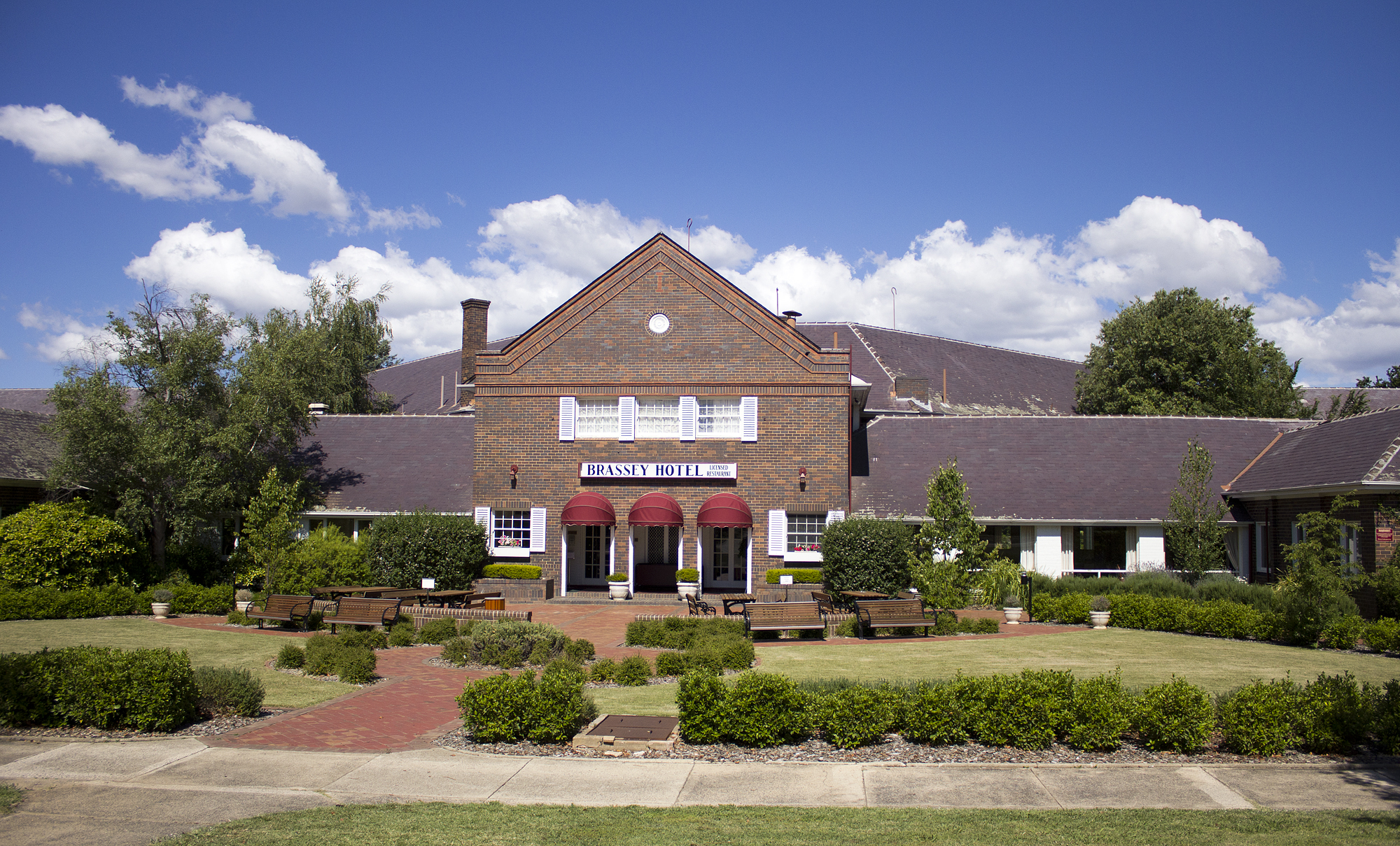
Brassey Hotel

Settlement of Barton began in 1922. The first stage of the heritage-listed Barton Housing Precinct began in 1926 and 1927. It was named after Sir Edmund Barton, the first Prime Minister of Australia, in 1928. Streets in Barton are named after Governors.

The following areas are heritage listed:

- The Barton Housing Precinct, bounded by Macquarie and Darling streets and Telopea Park, Batman and Currong streets, excluding Brassey Hotel (separately listed), which was built part of John Sulman's "initial city" at Kingston prior to the construction of the current city centre. The first houses were constructed between 1926 and 1927 to meet the urgent need for housing for public servants for the opening of the new Parliament House in Canberra in 1927. The precinct also contains privately built houses designed by early local architects Mitchell, Sproule and Oliphant.
- The Brassey Hotel, which was completed in 1927 by the Federal Capital Commission in an American Colonial Revival style. The Heritage Council states that "with its garden setting and axial placement at the end of Belmore Gardens," it makes a "major contribution to the urban environment" of the area.
- The Hotel Kurrajong, which was designed by John Smith Murdoch in the garden pavilion style. It often provided housed politicians, especially from the ALP, for half a century and is particularly noted for being the place of Ben Chifley's death.
- Telopea Park School, which was designed by John Smith Murdoch in 1922 and opened on 11 September 1923 and has had many subsequent extensions and modifications.
- Telopea Park, which was first planted by Thomas Weston in 1923.

The former Patent Office and the Edmund Barton building are outside the jurisdiction of the ACT Heritage Council but are recognised and protected in the Commonwealth Heritage List.

== Suburb amenities ==
The Edmund Barton Building

Barton mainly contains government or national institutions and so has few commercial areas such as shops. Barton contains the ACT Hospice, named Clare Holland House and located at the east end of Lake Burley Griffin. On Blackall Street is St Mark's National Theological Centre, a partner in Charles Sturt University School of Theology. The Australian Centre for Christianity and Culture is located next to St Mark's. The Australian Federal Police College is on Brisbane Avenue. Telopea Park School is on New South Wales Crescent.

Brassey Hotel was named after Sir Thomas Brassey, Governor of Victoria. It was originally a guest house for mid level government officials and for Members of Parliament.

The Hotel Kurrajong, favored by Ben Chifley and the location of his death in 1951, is also located in the suburb. It is now occupied by the Australian International Hotel School.

Parks in Barton include Telopea Park, York Park, Bowen Park which is on the south shore of Lake Burley Griffin, and Grevillea Park on the north side of the lake.

== Demographics ==
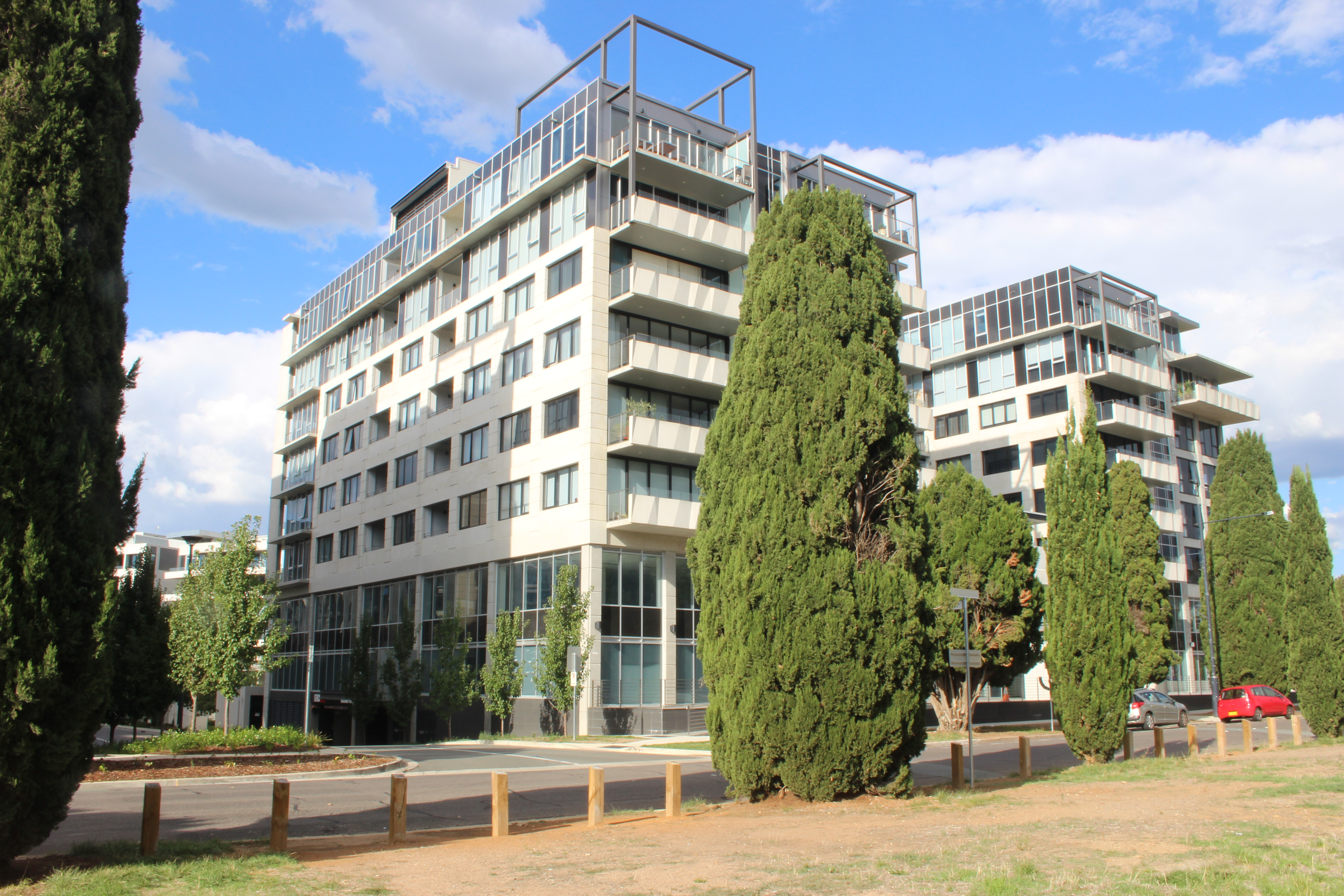
Apartments in Sydney Avenue

At the 2021 census, the population of Barton was 1,946. Aboriginal and Torres Strait Islander people made up 1.0% of the population. 62.5% of the population were born in Australia. Only 6.3% of dwellings were separate houses (compared to the Australian average of 72.3%) and 3.0% were semi-detached, row or terrace houses (Australian average: 12.6%), while 90.9% were flats, units or apartments (Australian average: 14.2%). 46.5% of the population were professionals, compared to the Australian average of 24.0%. Notably 31.6% worked in central government administration, compared to the Australian average of 1.1% and the ACT-wide average of 17.1%. The median weekly personal income for people aged 15 years was $1,775, compared to the median Australian income of $805. Barton is favoured by young adults with 26.4% of its population in the 25- to 34-year-old age group (compared to the Australian average of 14.3%). The suburb has few children under 15: 7.2%, compared to 18.2% Australia-wide. 46.6% of the dwellings are occupied by single person households, compared to the Australian average of 25.6%. 47.2% of the population had no religion and 13.3% did not state their religion, while 13.3% were Catholic and 8.8% were Anglican.

== Governance ==
Barton is located within the federal electorate of Canberra, which is currently represented by Alicia Payne in the House of Representatives. In the ACT Legislative Assembly, Barton is part of the electorate of Kurrajong, which elects five members on the basis of proportional representation, currently two Labor, two Greens and one Liberal.

== Geology ==
A patch of Ordovician Pittman Formation greywacke outcrops in the south along Canberra Avenue. Silurian Canberra Formation, calcareous Shale is under most of the suburb. Tertiary river gravels are found in the Blackall Street area.

== Education ==
Barton residents get preference for:

- Forrest Primary
- Telopea Park School (for high school)
- Narrabundah College
