= Kybeyan River =

River in New South Wales, Australia

Kybeyan
- Location of the Kybeyan River mouth in New South Wales

Location
- Country: Australia
- State: New South Wales
- Region: South Eastern Highlands (IBRA), Monaro
- Municipality: Cooma-Monaro

Physical characteristics
- Source: Great Dividing Range
  - location: south-east of Kybeyan
  - coordinates: 36°24′21″S 149°28′47″E
  - elevation: 1,060 m (3,480 ft)
- Mouth: Numeralla River
  - location: near Warrens Corner
  - coordinates: 36°13′13″S 149°21′25″E
  - elevation: 745 m (2,444 ft)
- Length: 36 km (22 mi)

Basin features
- River system: Murrumbidgee catchment, Murray–Darling basin

The Kybeyan River, a watercourse that is part of the Murrumbidgee catchment within the Murray–Darling basin, is located in the Monaro region of New South Wales, Australia.

The river rises on the western slopes of the Great Dividing Range, near Greenland Swamp, and flows generally north and north-west, joined by three tributaries before reaching its confluence with the Numeralla River, near Warrens Corner, descending 317 metres (1,040 ft) over its 36-kilometre (22 mi) course.

== See also ==
- List of rivers of New South Wales (A–K)
- List of rivers of Australia
