= Big Badja River =

Big Badja Badja
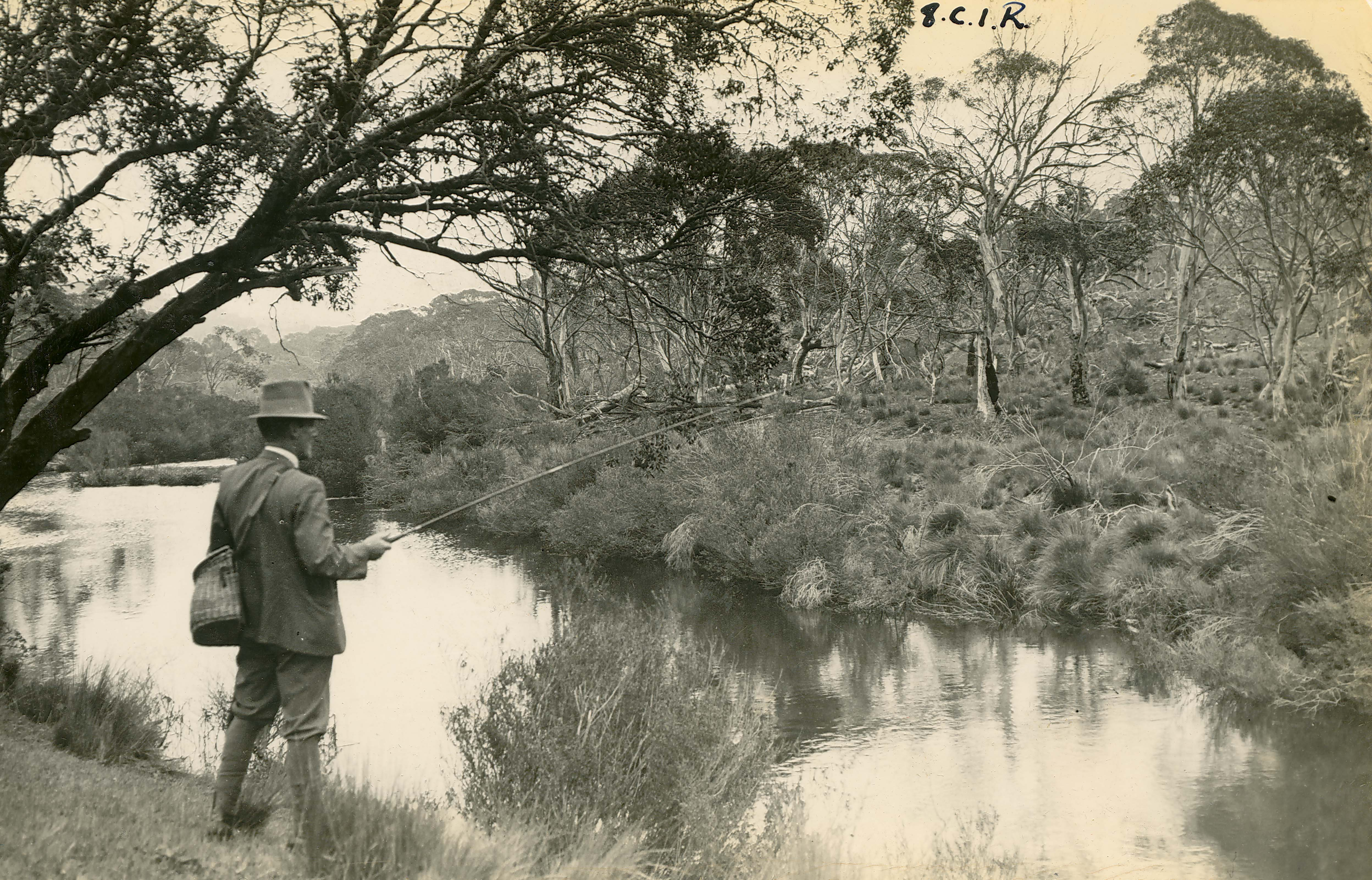

- Location of the mouth of the Big Badja River in New South Wales

Location
- Country: Australia
- State: New South Wales
- Region: South Eastern Highlands (IBRA), Monaro
- Municipality: Cooma-Monaro

Physical characteristics
- Source: Big Badja Hill
  - location: north–east of Cooma
  - coordinates: 36°3′10″S 149°33′00″E
  - elevation: 1,030 m (3,380 ft)
- Mouth: Numeralla River
  - location: near Numeralla
  - coordinates: 36°10′27″S 149°20′52″E
  - elevation: 735 m (2,411 ft)
- Length: 32 km (20 mi)

Basin features
- River system: Murray–Darling basin
- Tributaries
  - left: Undoo Creek, Peppers Creek
  - right: Boundary Creek (New South Wales)

The Big Badja River, a perennial river of the Murrumbidgee catchment within the Murray–Darling basin, is located in the Monaro region of New South Wales, Australia.

The river rises on the western slopes of the Great Dividing Range, north–east of Cooma at the junction of the Kybeyan and Gourock Ranges, and generally flows south and west, joined by three minor tributaries before reaching its confluence with the Numeralla River at the village of Numeralla; dropping 295 metres (968 ft) over its course of 32 kilometres (20 mi).

Alluvial gold was discovered in and along the river in 1858, with the Big Badja diggings worked between 1861 and 1868.

== See also ==
- List of rivers of Australia
