= Colinton, New South Wales =

Colinton
- Town
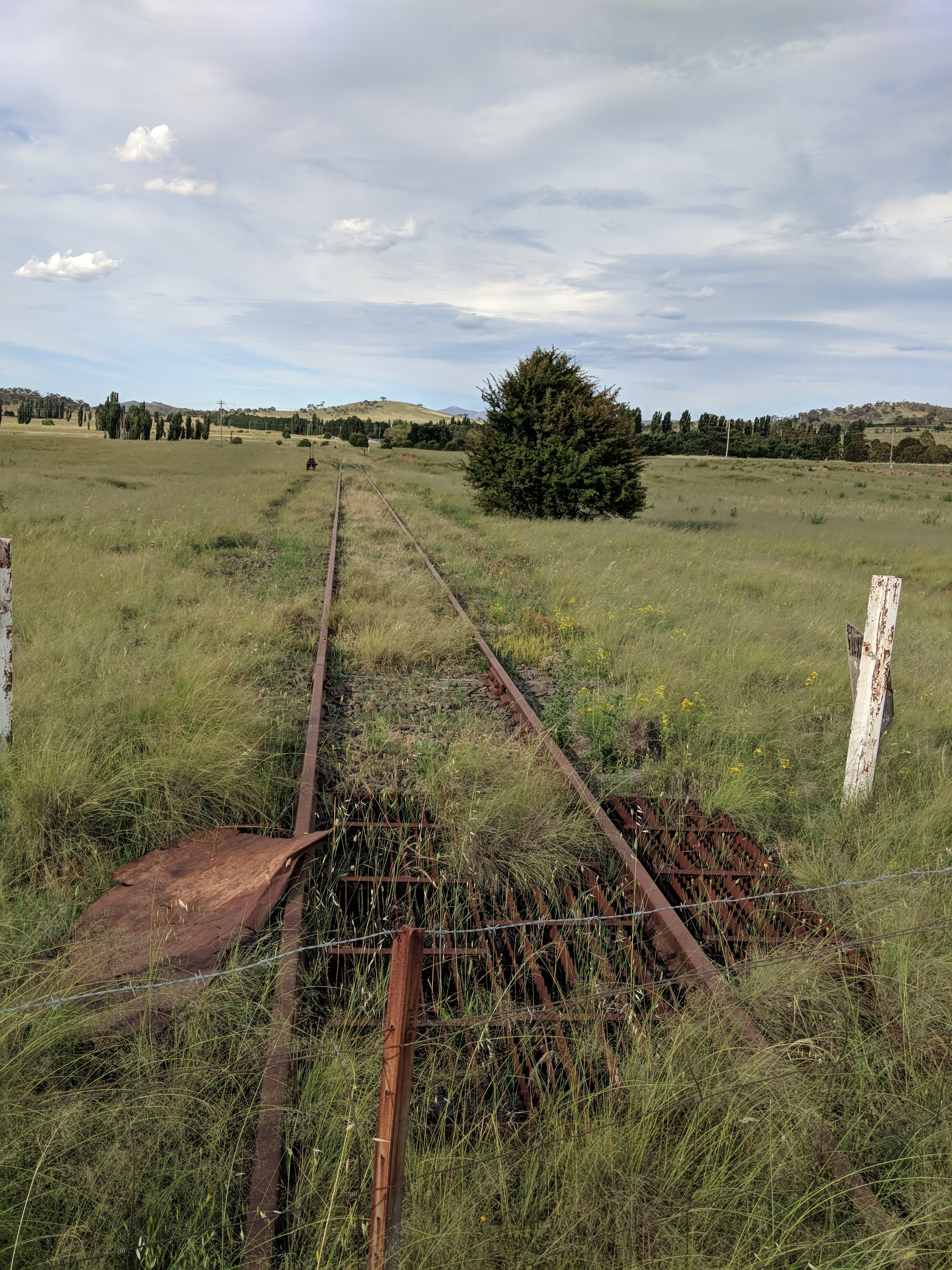
- Bombala Railway at the site of the former Colinton station, looking north

- Interactive map of Colinton
- Coordinates: 35°51′57″S 149°09′02″E
- Country: Australia
- State: New South Wales
- Region: Monaro
- LGA: Snowy Monaro Regional Council
- Location: 73 km (45 mi) S of Canberra; 44 km (27 mi) N of Cooma; 354 km (220 mi) SW of Sydney

Government
  - State electorate: Monaro
  - Federal division: Eden-Monaro

Population
  - Total: 115 (2016 census)
- Postcode: 2626
- County: Beresford
- Parish: Colinton
Localities around Colinton
ACT	Michelago	Anembo
Bumbalong	Colinton	Jerangle
Shannons Flat	Bredbo	Jerangle

Colinton is a locality in the Snowy Monaro Region, New South Wales, Australia. At the 2021 census, it had a population of 115. There was once a village and railway station of the same name.

== Location ==
It lies on the eastern side of the Murrumbidgee River and on both sides of the Monaro Highway about 73 km south of Canberra and about 44 km north of Cooma. The nearest settlements are Michelago, 21 km to the north, and Bredbo, 10 km to the south.

== History ==
=== Aboriginal and early settler history ===
The area later known as Colinton lies within the traditional lands of Ngarigo people.

In June 1823, an exploration party, composed of Captain Mark Currie, Major John Ovens, Joseph Wild and an unknown Aboriginal guide, followed a route to the east of the steep slopes of the Murrumbidgee River's gorge and were the first colonists to pass through the area. Although the area was just outside the southern boundary—Michelago Creek—of the Nineteen Counties, in which settlement was allowed by the colonial government, it was suitable for sheep grazing. Within a few years a squatter took over the area. By 1848, it was a part of the vast 'Micalago' sheep run.

=== Mining ===
In the 1860s, alluvial gold was found in the area and the Colinton Gold Field was gazetted in 1878. In the late 1860s, the Colinton field was being worked mainly by Chinese miners. Attempts in the late 1860s to find a reef appear to have failed.

There was a small gold mine, Colinton Gold Mine, to the north of the village. The reef associated with this mine was discovered in 1888, and it was still being worked intermittently during the 1890s. There was a silver-lead mine, Colinton Silver Mine, to the south-east of the village, near the base of the western side of Mount Colinton.

=== Village of Colinton ===
A village of Colinton was proclaimed by 1861 and suburban land was on sale there. The site of the village itself was gazetted in May 1862. As a consequence the Crown Lands Act of 1884, it was proclaimed a village for a second time in 1885. It is likely, though uncertain, that the village was named after Colinton in Scotland.

The village was situated mainly to the east of the railway line, on both sides of the main road to Cooma, which became one of its streets, Cooma Street. Other planned streets of the village were, Newton, Hurry, Wise, Brent, Colyers, Heber, Cosgrove, Hay, Ryrie and Queanbeyan Streets. There was also a planned suburban area on the western side of the railway; its planned streets included Charles and Hope Streets. There were also planned streets known as Burton, Stephen and Church Streets. Land was reserved for public buildings in 1889. A road from Newton St, Colinton, to the Murrumbidgee River—now Bumbalong Road—was opened in 1887. Colinton had a public school from 1883 to 1938.

Colinton railway station opened with the extension of the railway from Michelago to Cooma (later the Bombala railway line) on 31 May 1889. The station platform was 264 feet long—on the western side of the line, just to the north of Newton Street—and there was a siding and level crossing at Colinton.

During construction of the railway from Michelago to Cooma, most of the major works—four bridges, a tunnel and some cuttings and high embankments—lay between Michelego station and the far side of the Bredbo River. The construction contractor had 600 men working on the line and living in tents. One of the workers' camps was at Colinton, resulting in a temporary population boom at Colinton, from around 1885 until the opening of the railway. The discovery of a gold reef in 1888, by employees of the railway construction contractor, led to desertions from the camp as workers and locals staked claims. The village had a hotel known as the Travellers' Rest Hotel and in the mid-1880s there were several other drinking establishments. Around the same time, there was a market garden operated by ethnic-Chinese near the village.

However, in 1891, Colinton was described, by a visitor, as a mining hamlet "whose glory was departed, now left a prey to goats, pigs, and fowls". Later, the plan of the village was reduced in size and roads closed, several times. In 1938, aside from the soon to close school, the village had a post office and just five houses. In the mid twentieth century, there was still a small settlement at the station, but there is little sign of it now. As late as 1954, the village's post office was being used as a polling place for elections. By the 1950s, village allotments were being sold off for unpaid rates. The unattended railway station closed in 1975 and the railway line ceased operating in 1989.

The Village of Colinton ceased to exist officially, in 1980, when its name was discontinued by the Geographical Names Board.

=== Railway ===
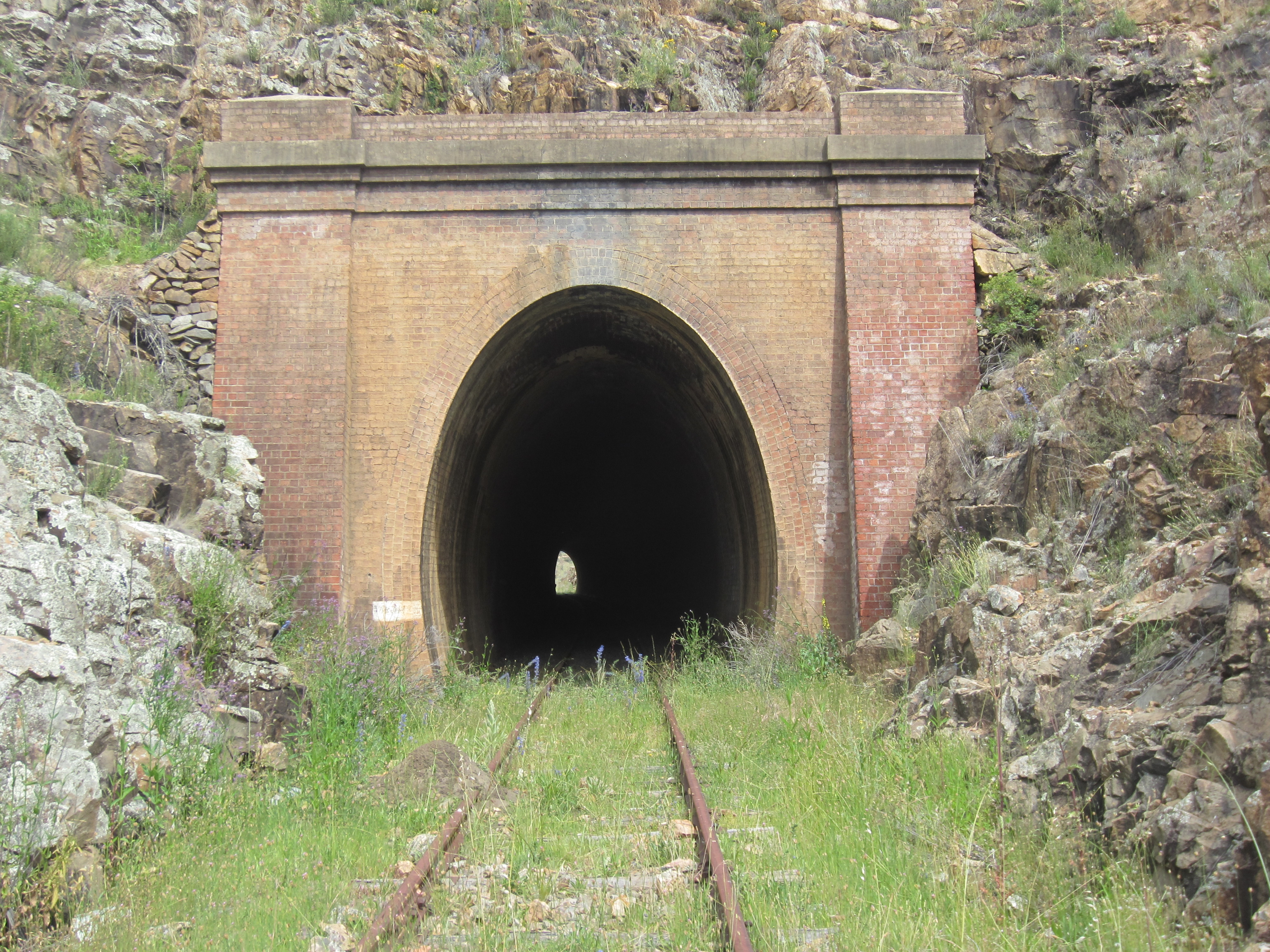
Colinton Tunnel, North Portal 2 (Nov. 2020)

Colinton had a stop along the Bombala railway line from 1889 until its closure in 1975. The location of the station is only marked by a two-lever frame.

The railway tunnel nearby, named the Colinton Tunnel, was opened in 1889 along with the Colinton railway stop and closed in 1990. It had only a single track and spanned 161m. A fatal accident occurred in the 1890s involving a man hit by a passing train while stuck inside the tunnel on horseback.

== Present day ==
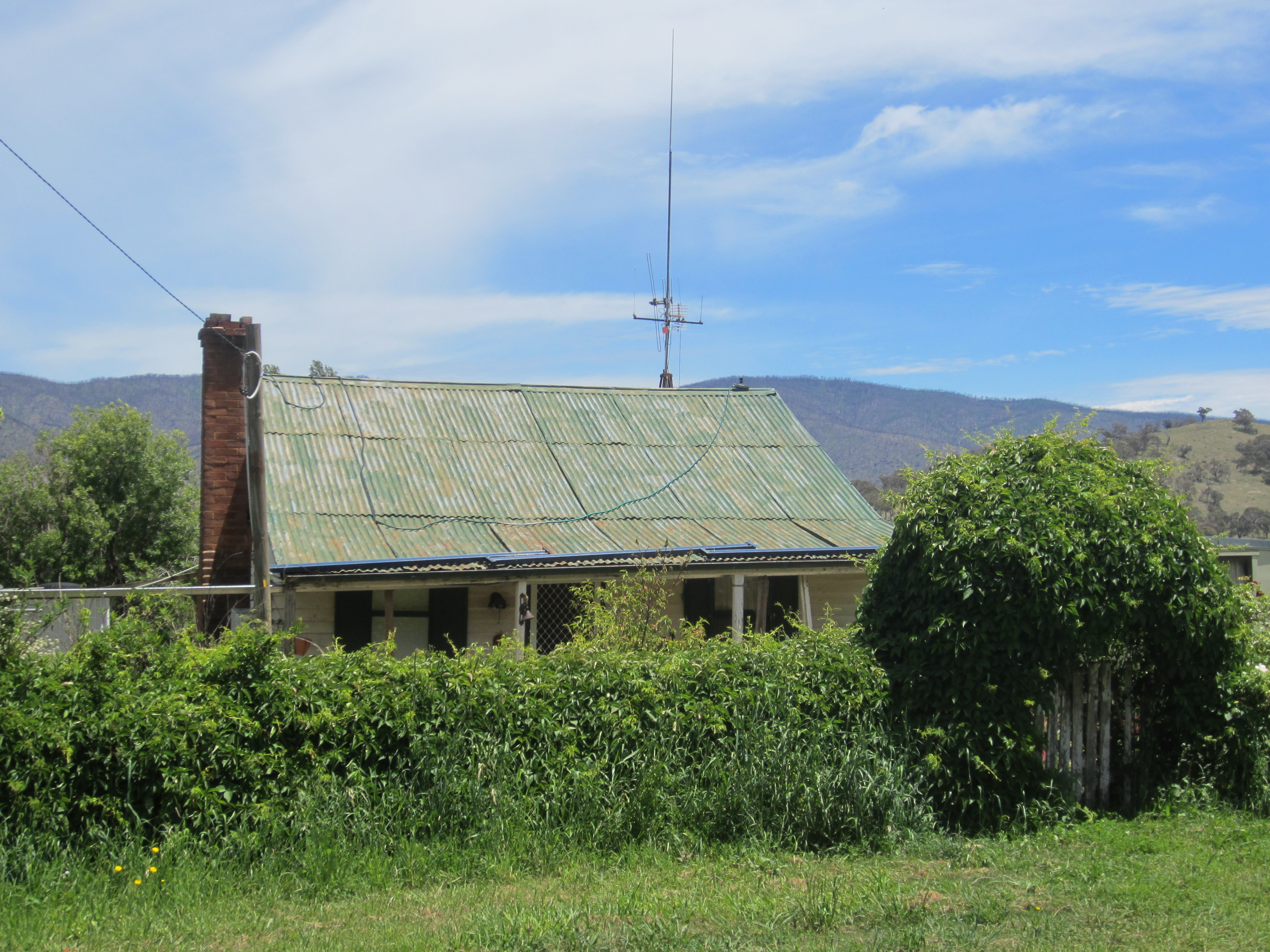
Old cottage at Colinton (Nov. 2020).

Newton Street, one of the streets of the former village, still appears on maps, as do many of the old village's building allotments. The Monaro Highway follows the alignment of the former Cooma Street, through most of the village site. Since 1989, there has been a Rural Fire Brigade at Colinton, with its shed located within the site of the former village. The Bumbalong Road provides access to a little known bridge across the Murrumbidgee, the Bumbalong Bridge, Colinton, that leads to the neighbouring locality of Bumbalong. On the Monaro Highway, where it passes through the old village's site, there is an old cottage that was once part of the village. The disused Bombala railway line still passes just to the west of the old village's site and the remnants of the old level crossing at Newton Street can still be seen, as can the wooden railway bridges over Ingalara Creek and Colyers Creek. To the north, on the Monaro Highway, where the old railway once crossed that road, is the Colinton Rest Area. The locality also gave its name to the Colinton Gorge on the Murrumbidgee and to the Colinton Tunnel, which lies on the old railway between the former stations of Colinton and Bredbo.
