= Numeralla River =

River in New South Wales, Australia

Numeralla Umaralla River
- Location of the mouth of the Numeralla River in New South Wales
- Etymology: Aboriginal: valley of plenty

Location
- Country: Australia
- State: New South Wales
- Region: South Eastern Highlands (IBRA), Monaro
- Municipality: Snowy Monaro Regional Council

Physical characteristics
- Source: Kybeyan Range
  - location: east of Nimmitabel
  - coordinates: 36°30′27″S 149°25′20″E
  - elevation: 1,070 m (3,510 ft)
- Mouth: Murrumbidgee River
  - location: north of Cooma
  - coordinates: 36°3′56″S 149°9′1″E
  - elevation: 706 m (2,316 ft)
- Length: 94 km (58 mi)

Basin features
- River system: Murrumbidgee catchment, Murray–Darling basin
- Tributaries
  - left: Kybeyan River, Big Badja River
  - right: Rock Flat Creek

The Numeralla River, a perennial river that is part of the Murrumbidgee catchment within the Murray–Darling basin, is located in the Monaro region of New South Wales, Australia.

The name of the river is claimed to derive from an Aboriginal word meaning "valley of plenty", but Flavia Hodges has called this etymology "highly suspect".

== Course ==
The river rises on the northern slopes of the Great Dividing Range, about 12 kilometres (7.5 mi) east of the village of Nimmitabel, and flows generally north and west, joined by eight tributaries including the Kybeyan and Big Badja rivers before reaching its confluence with the Murrumbidgee River, south of Bredbo and about 18 kilometres (11 mi) north of Cooma, descending 367 metres (1,204 ft) over its 93-kilometre (58 mi) course.

The river is a diverse ecosystem rich with many different animal species such as the uncommonly seen Wanderer's kingfisher and the Kiora frog. Its native freshwater fish fauna had been entirely replaced by introduced trout species, now replaced by the introduced European carp species; a common situation in south-east Australia.

Alluvial gold was discovered in and along the river in 1858, with the diggings worked until 1868.

== See also ==
- List of rivers of New South Wales (L–Z)
- List of rivers of Australia
- Rivers of New South Wales
