= Murrumbidgee River =

Major river in southeastern Australia

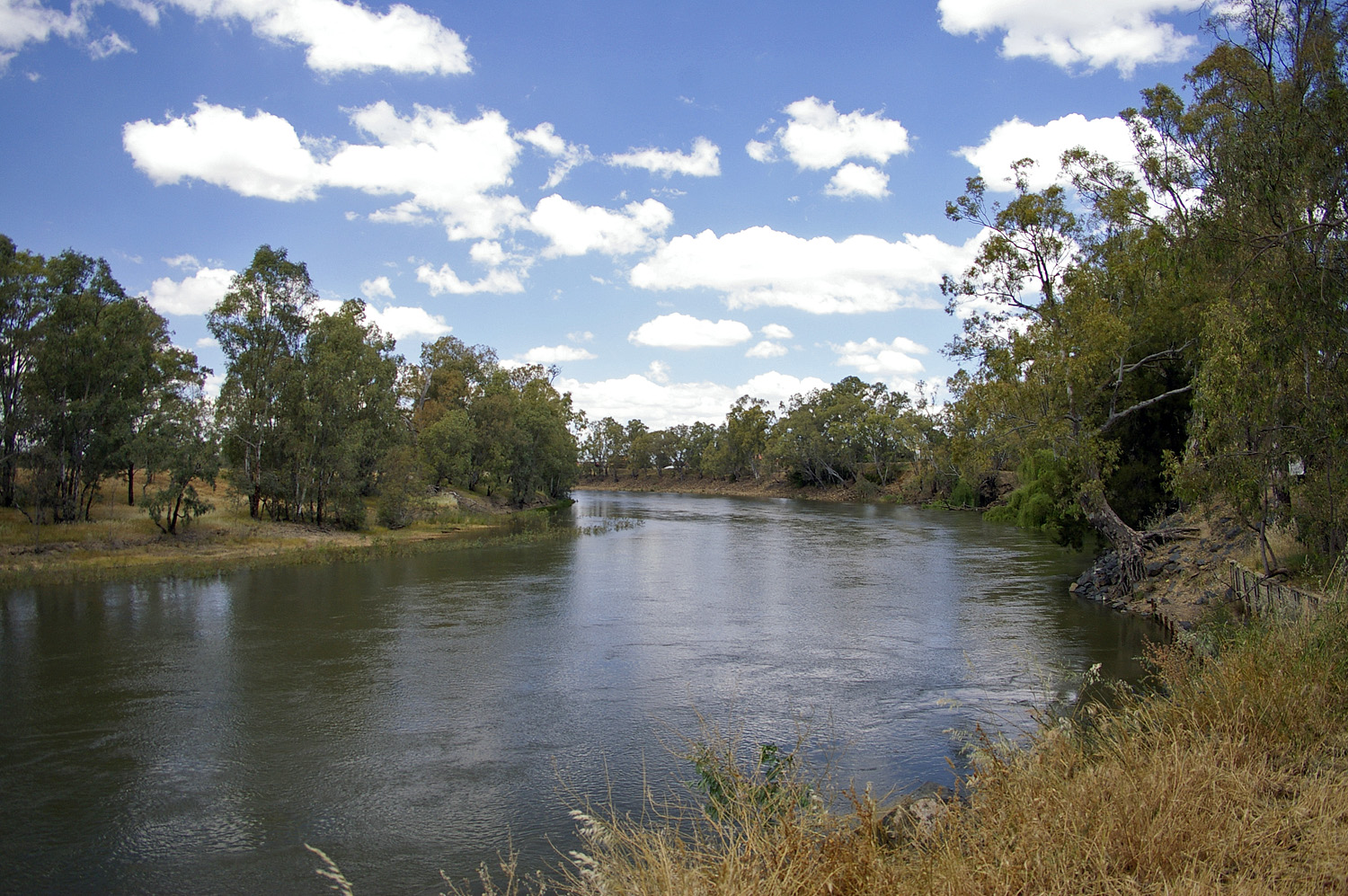
- Murrumbidgee River at Wagga Wagga

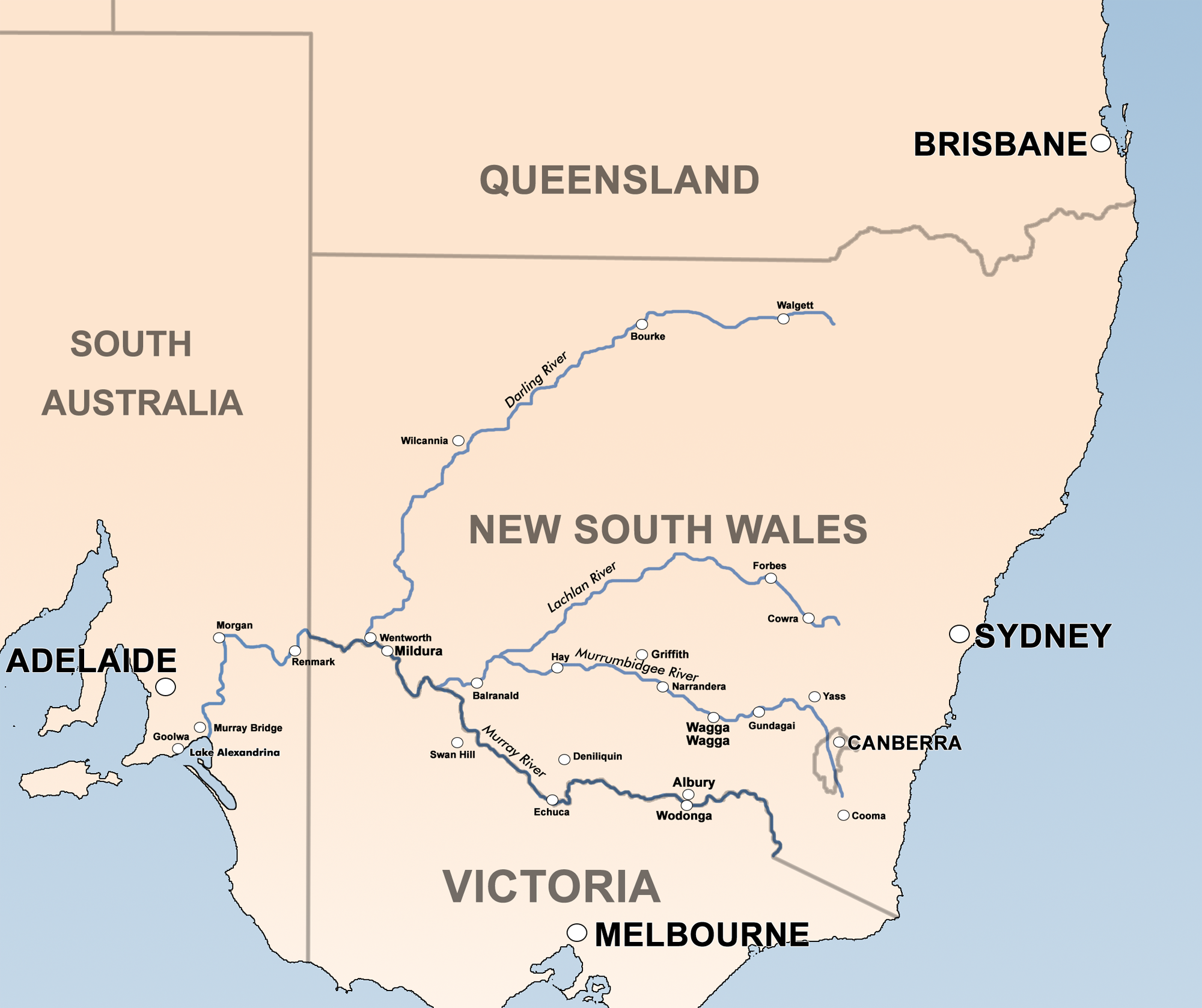
- The Murrumbidgee is a major tributary of the Murray River
- Etymology: Aboriginal Wiradjuri language: "big water"
- Nickname: 'bidgee

Location
- Country: Australia
- State/Territory: New South Wales; Australian Capital Territory
- IBRA: South Eastern Highlands; Riverina
- Districts: Monaro; Capital Country; South Western Slopes; Riverina; Murrumbidgee Irrigation Area
- Municipalities: Queanbeyan–Palerang; Snowy Monaro; Yass Valley; Snowy Valleys; Cootamundra-Gundagai; Junee; Coolamon; Wagga Wagga; Narrandera; Leeton; Griffith; Greater Hume; Murrumbidgee

Physical characteristics
- Source: Peppercorn Hill
  - location: Snowy Mountains, NSW
  - coordinates: 35°35′7″S 148°36′5″E
  - elevation: 1,560 m (5,120 ft)
- Mouth: confluence with Murray River
  - location: near Boundary Bend, NSW/Vic
  - coordinates: 34°43′43″S 143°13′8″E
  - elevation: 55 m (180 ft)
- Length: 1,485 km (923 mi)
- Basin size: 84,917 km^{2} (32,787 sq mi)
- Discharge
  - location: Wagga Wagga
  - average: 120 m^{3}/s (4,200 cu ft/s)
- Discharge
  - location: Narrandera
  - average: 105 m^{3}/s (3,700 cu ft/s)
- Discharge
  - location: Balranald
  - average: 27 m^{3}/s (950 cu ft/s)

Basin features
- River system: Murray River, Murray–Darling basin
- Tributaries
  - left: Gudgenby River, Cotter River, Goodradigbee River, Tumut River
  - right: Numeralla River, Bredbo River, Molonglo River, Yass River, Lachlan River
- Reservoirs: Tantangara Reservoir, Lake Burrinjuck

The Murrumbidgee River (/mʌrəmˈbɪdʒi/) is a major tributary of the Murray River within the Murray–Darling basin and the second longest river in Australia. It flows through the Australian state of New South Wales and the Australian Capital Territory, descending 1,500 metres (4,900 ft) over 1,485 kilometres (923 mi), generally in a west-northwesterly direction from the foot of Peppercorn Hill in the Fiery Range of the Snowy Mountains towards its confluence with the Murray River near Boundary Bend.

The word Murrumbidgee or Marrambidya means "big water" in the Wiradjuri language, one of the local Australian Aboriginal languages. The river itself flows through several traditional Aboriginal Australian lands, home to various Aboriginal peoples. In the Australian Capital Territory, the river is bordered by a narrow strip of land on each side; these are managed as the Murrumbidgee River Corridor (MRC). This land includes many nature reserves, eight recreation reserves, a European heritage conservation zone and rural leases.

== Flow ==
The mainstream of the river system flows for 900 kilometres (560 mi). The river's headwaters arise from the wet heath and bog at the foot of Peppercorn Hill situated along Long Plain which is within the Fiery Range of the Snowy Mountains; and about 50 kilometres (31 mi) north of Kiandra. From its headwaters it flows to its confluence with the Murray River. The river flows for 66 kilometres (41 mi) through the Australian Capital Territory near Canberra, picking up the important tributaries of the Gudgenby, Queanbeyan, Molonglo and Cotter Rivers. The Murrumbidgee drains much of southern New South Wales and all of the Australian Capital Territory, and is an important source of irrigation water for the Riverina farming area.

The reaches of the Murrumbidgee in the Australian Capital Territory (ACT) are affected by the complete elimination of large spring snowmelt flows and a reduction of average annual flows of almost 50%, due to Tantangara Dam. Tantangara Dam was completed in 1960 on the headwaters of Murrumbidgee River and diverted approximately 99% of the river's flow at that point into Lake Eucumbene. This has extremely serious effects on native fish populations and other native aquatic life and has led to serious siltation, stream contraction, fish habitat loss, and other problems. The Murrumbidgee where it enters the ACT is effectively half the river it used to be. The reduced and significantly modified flow of the river is further exacerbated by dams on its tributaries, such as Scrivener Dam, Cotter Dam, and Googong Dam.

A study suggests a section of the upper river's channels are relatively new in geological terms, dating from the early Miocene (the Miocene era being from 23 to 5 million years ago). It is suggested that the Upper Murrumbidgee is an anabranch of the Tumut River (that once continued north along Mutta Mutta Creek) when geological uplift near Adaminaby diverted its flow. From Gundagai onwards the rivers flow within its ancestral channel.

In June 2008 the Murray-Darling Basin Commission released a report on the condition of the Murray–Darling basin, with the Goulburn and Murrumbidgee Rivers rated in a very poor condition in the Murray-Darling basin with fish stocks in both rivers were also rated as extremely poor, with only 13 of the original 22 native fish species still found in the Murrumbidgee River.

== History ==
The Murrumbidgee River runs through the traditional lands of the Ngarigo, Ngunnawal, Wiradjuri, Nari Nari and Muthi Muthi Aboriginal peoples.

== Exploration ==
The Murrumbidgee River was known to Europeans before they first recorded it. In 1820 the explorer Charles Throsby informed the Governor of New South Wales that he anticipated finding "a considerable river of salt water (except at very wet seasons), called by the natives Mur-rum-big-gee". In the expedition journal, Throsby wrote as a marginal note: "This river or stream is called by the natives Yeal-am-bid-gie ...". The river he had stumbled upon was in fact the Molonglo River, Throsby reached the actual river in April 1821.

In 1823, Brigade-Major John Ovens and Captain Mark Currie reached the upper Murrumbidgee when exploring south of Lake George. In 1829, Charles Sturt and his party rowed down the lower half of the Murrumbidgee River in a stoutly built, large row-boat, from Narrandera to the Murray River, and then down the Murray River to the sea. They rowed back upstream, against the current to their starting point. Sturt's description of their passage through the junction of the Murrumbidgee and Murray Rivers is dramatic. His description of wild strong currents in the Murrumbidgee—in the middle of summer (14 January 1830), when flows are declining and close to the seasonal summer/autumn minimum, is in contrast to the reduced flow seen at the junction today in mid-summer:

The men looked anxiously out ahead; for the singular change in the river had impressed on them an idea, that we were approaching its termination ... We were carried at a fearful rate down its gloomy and contracted banks ... At 3 p.m., Hopkinson called out that we were approaching a junction, and in less than a minute afterwards, we were hurried into a broad and noble river ... such was the force with which we had been shot out of the Morumbidgee, that we were carried nearly to the bank opposite its embouchure, whilst we continued to gaze in silent astonishment on the capacious channel [of the Murray River] we had entered ...

The Murrumbidgee basin was opened to settlement in the 1830s and soon became an important farming area.

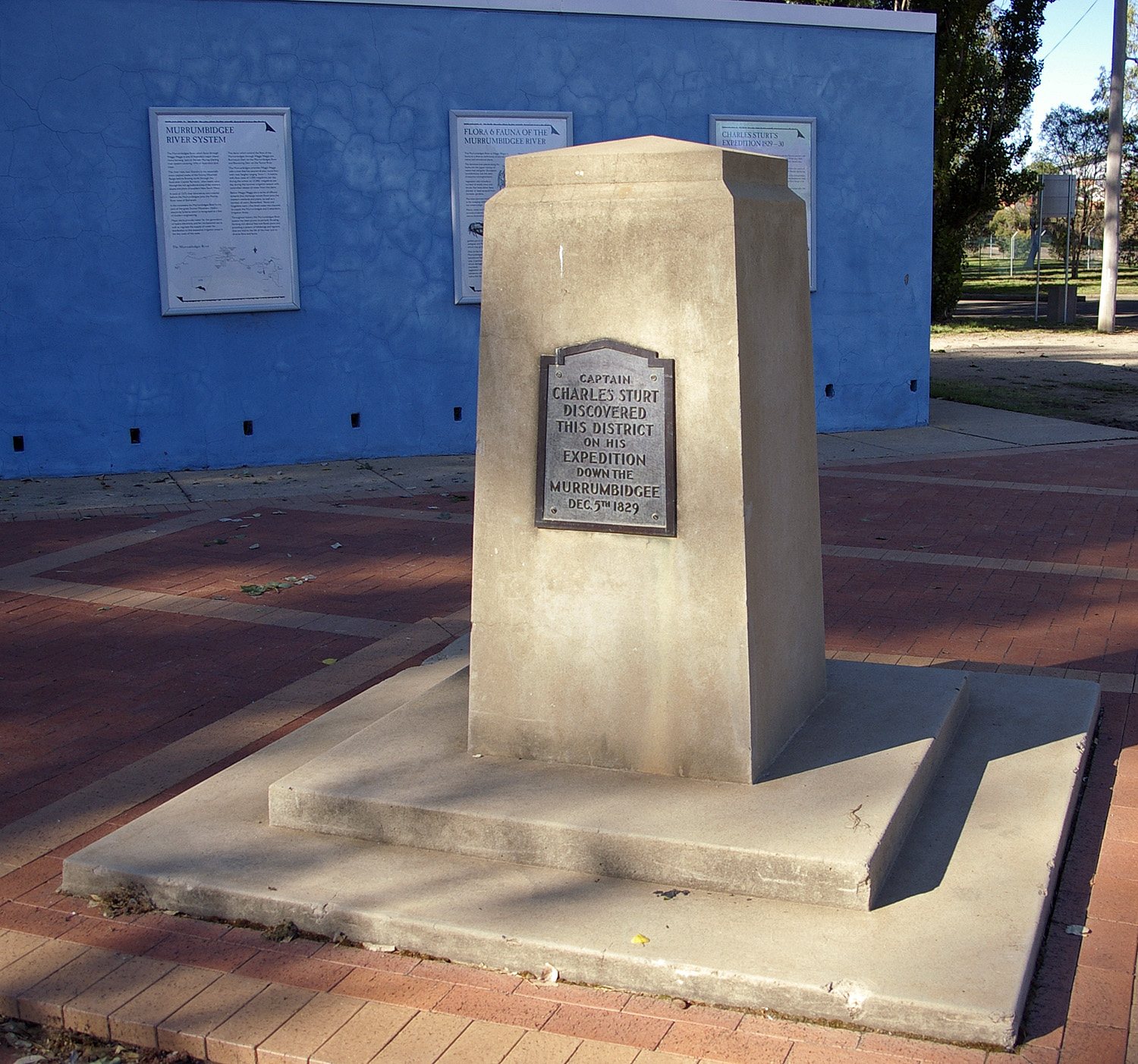
Charles Sturt Monument located at Wagga Beach in Wagga Wagga

Ernest Favenc, when writing on Australian exploration, commented on the relatively tardy European discovery of the river and that the river retained a name used by Indigenous Australians:

Here we may remark on the tenacity with which the Murrumbidgee River long eluded the eye of the white man. It is scarcely probable that Meehan and Hume, who on this occasion were within comparatively easy reach of the head waters, could have seen a new inland river at that time without mentioning the fact, but there is no record traceable anywhere as to the date of its discovery, or the name of its finder. When in 1823 Captain Currie and Major Ovens were led along its bank on to the beautiful Maneroo country by Joseph Wild, the stream was then familiar to the early settlers and called the Morumbidgee. Even in 1821, when Hume found the Yass Plains, almost on its bank, he makes no special mention of the river. From all this we may deduce the extremely probable fact that the position of the river was shown to some stockrider by a native, who also confided the aboriginal name, and so it gradually worked the knowledge of its identity into general belief. This theory is the more feasible as the river has retained its native name. If a white man of any known position had made the discovery, it would at once have received the name of some person holding official sway.

== Navigation ==
The river was once used as a transport route, with paddle steamers navigating the river as far as Gundagai. The river trade declined with the coming of the railways. Paddle steamers last used the Murrumbidgee in the 1930s. To allow the steamers and towed barges to pass, there were opening bridges at Hay, Balranald, and Carathool

== Floods ==
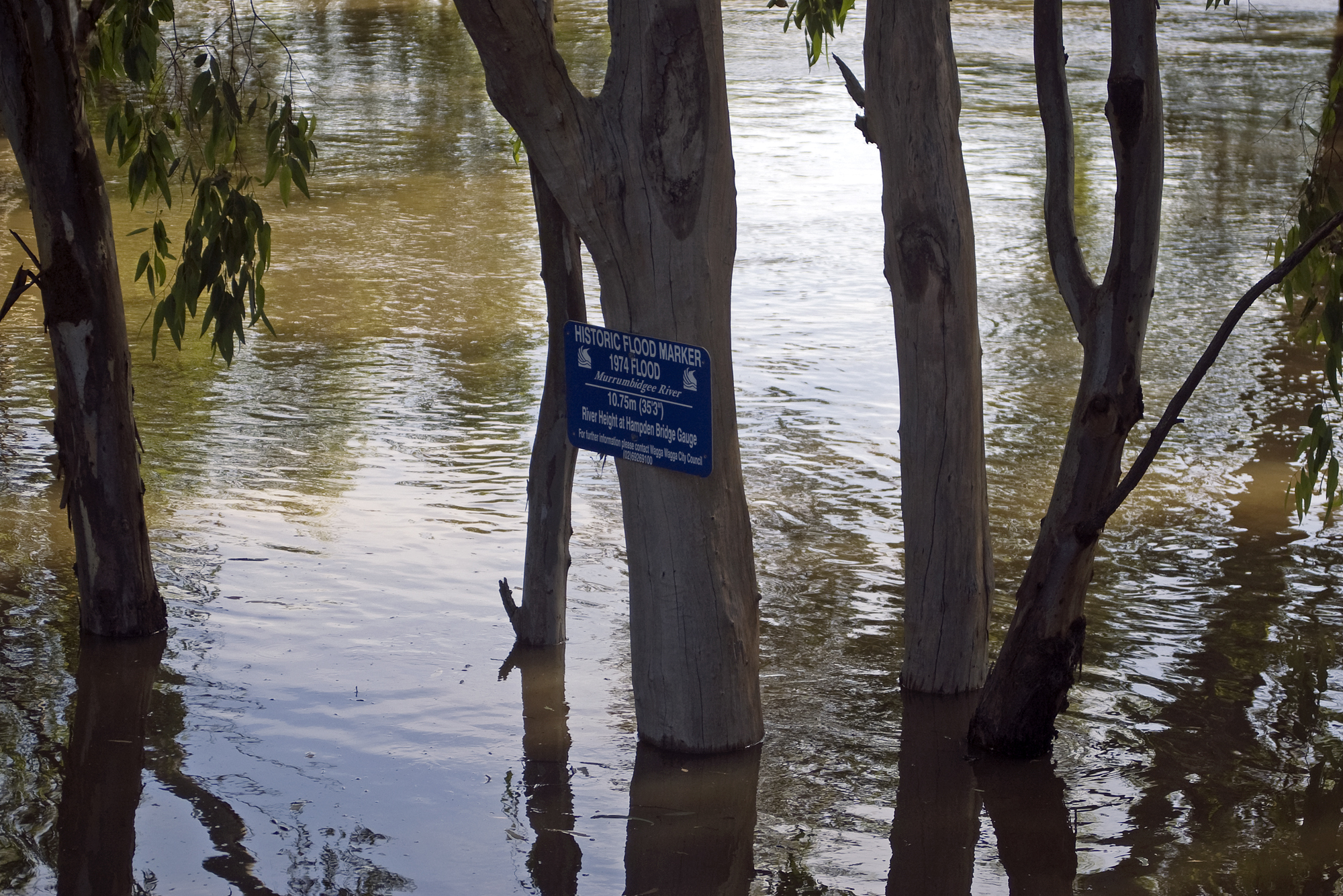
Murrumbidgee River in major flood in December 2010 and flood marker showing the height of the 1974 floods in Wagga Wagga

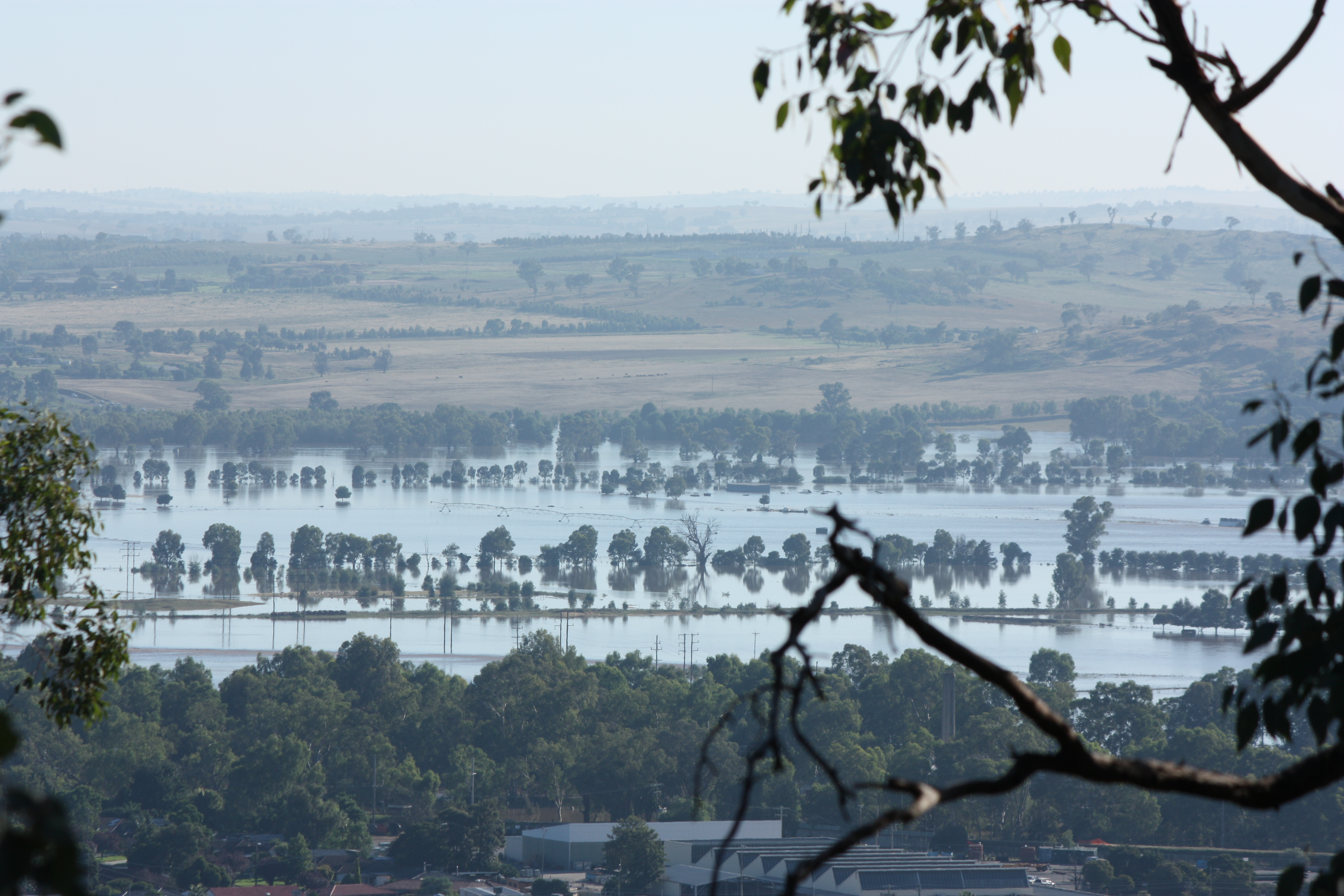
Wagga Wagga in major flood in March 2012

The river has risen above 7 metres (23 ft) at Gundagai nine times between 1852 and 2010, an average of just under once every eleven years. Since 1925, flooding has been minor with the exception of floods in 1974 and in December 2010, when the river rose to 10.2 metres (33 ft) at Gundagai. In the 1852 disaster, the river rose to just over 12.2 m (40 ft). The following year the river again rose to just over 12.5 m (41 ft). The construction of Burrinjuck Dam from 1907 has significantly reduced flooding but, despite the dam, there were major floods in 1925, 1950, 1974 and 2012.

The most notable flood was in 1852 when the town of Gundagai was swept away and 89 people, a third of the town's population, were killed. The town was rebuilt on higher ground.

In 1925, four people died and the flooding lasted for eight days.

The reduction in floods has consequences for wildlife, particularly birds and trees. There has been a decline in bird populations and black box flood plain eucalypt forest trees are starting to lose their crowns.

Major flooding occurred during March 2012 along the Murrumbidgee River including Wagga Wagga, where the river peaked at 10.56 metres (34.6 ft) on 6 March 2012. This peak was 0.18 metres (0.59 ft) below the 1974 flood level of 10.74 metres (35.2 ft).

== Wetlands ==
Major wetlands along the Murrumbidgee or associated with the Murrumbidgee catchment include:

- Lowbidgee Floodplain, 2,000 square kilometres (772 sq mi) between Maude and Balranald
- Mid-Murrumbidgee Wetlands along the river from Narrandera to Carathool
- Fivebough and Tuckerbil Swamps
- Tomneys Plain
- Micalong Swamp
- Lake George
- Yaouk Swamp
- Black Swamp & Coopers Swamp
- Big Badja Swamp

== Tributaries ==
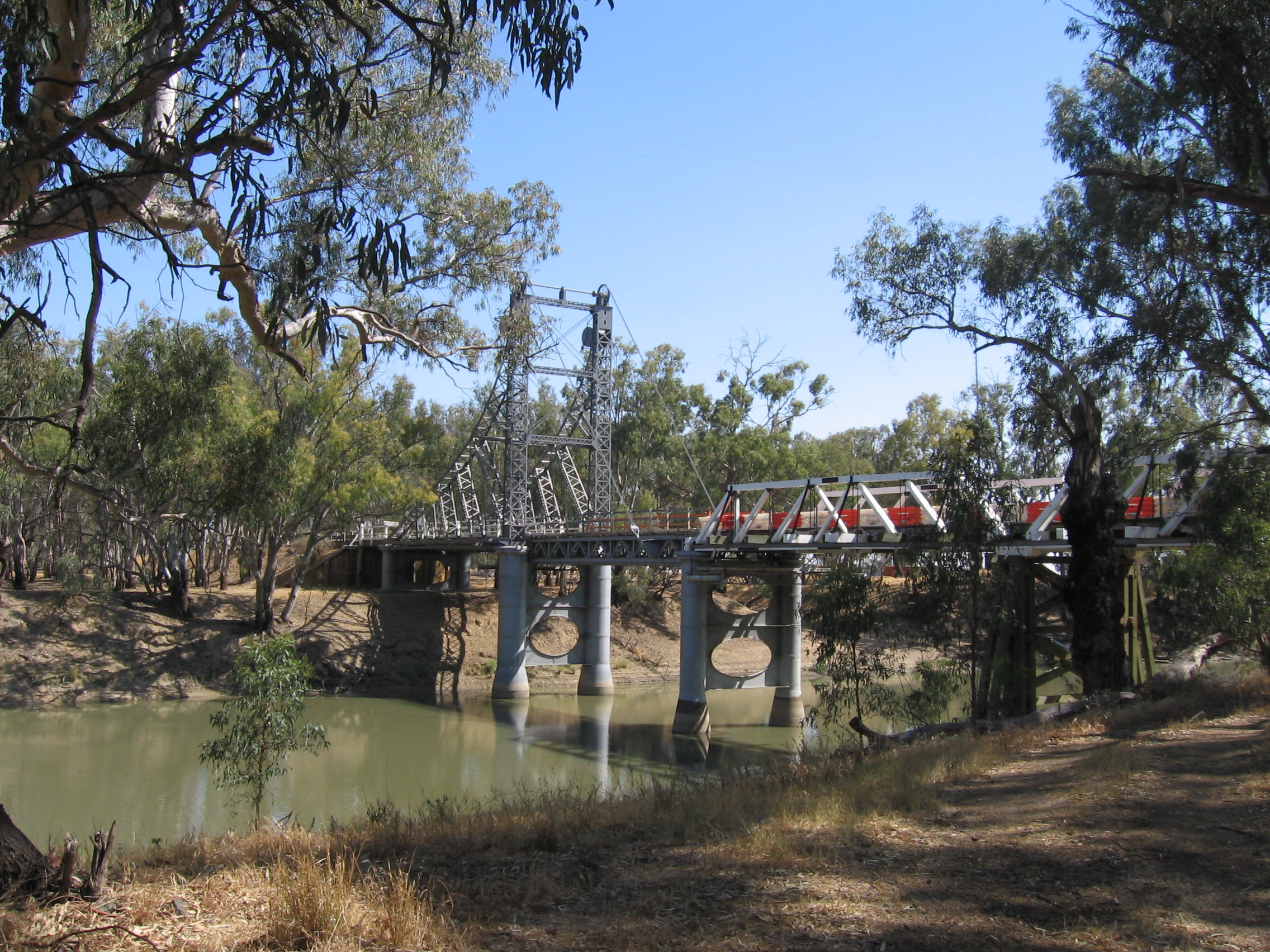
Bridge over the Murrumbidgee at Carrathool.

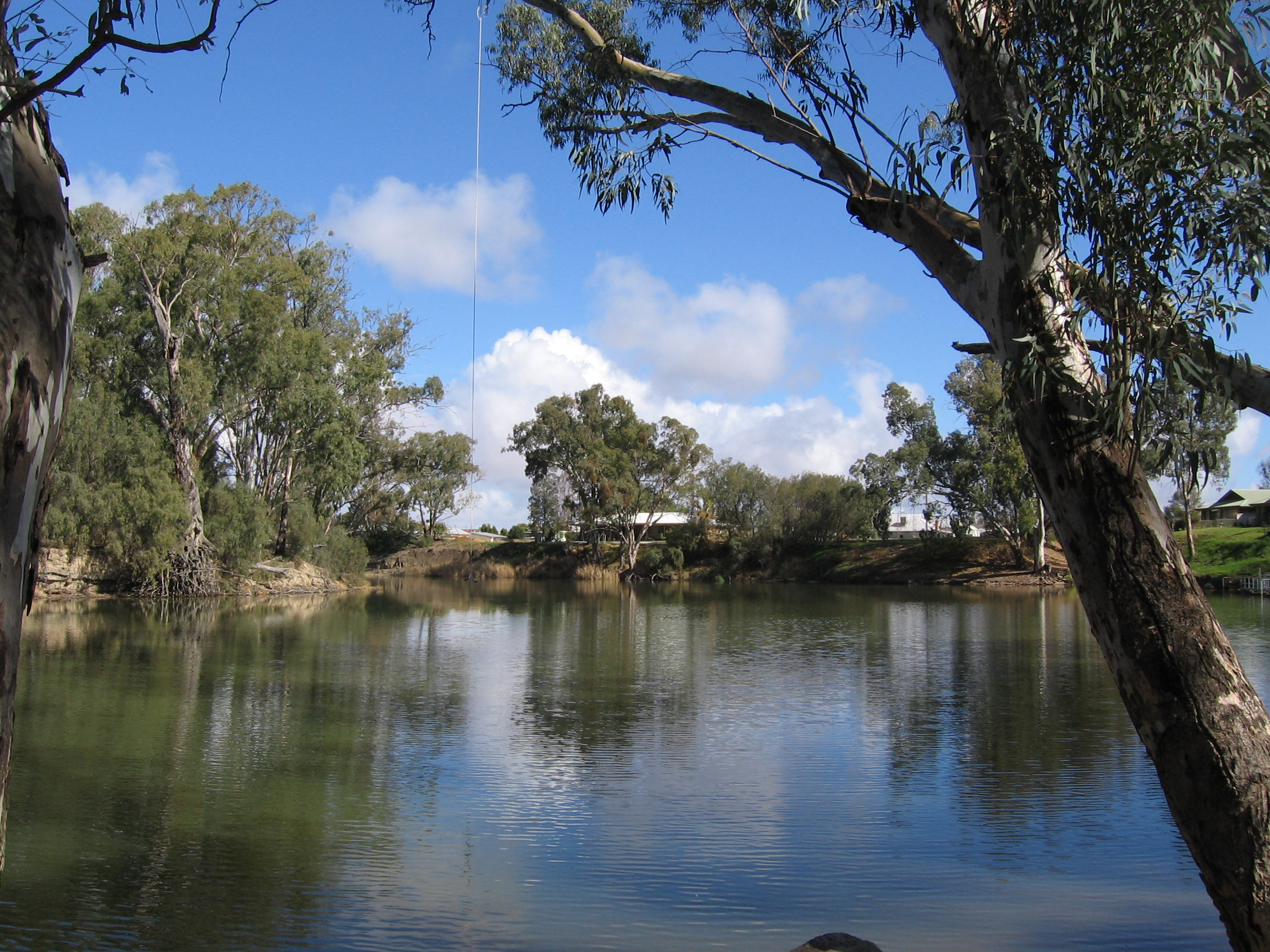
Swimming hole on the Murrumbidgee at Hay.

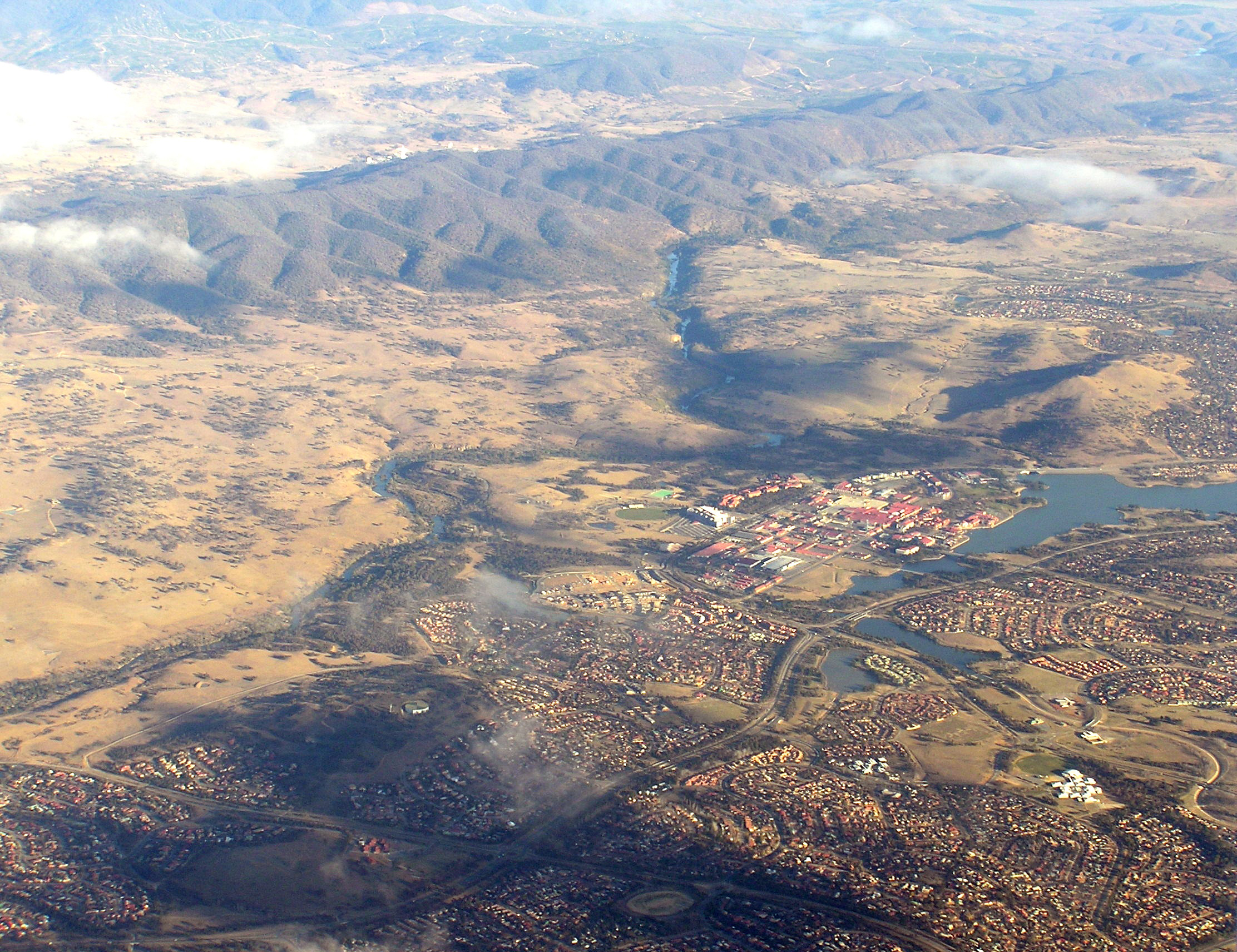
Aerial photo of Tuggeranong Town Centre, with Murrumbidgee River behind, Bullen Range is behind and Tidbinbilla Tracking Station is visible too.

The Murrumbidgee River has about 90 named tributaries in total; 24 rivers, and numerous creeks and gullies. The ordering of the basin, from source to mouth, of the major tributaries is:

Rivers of the Murrumbidgee River basin
Catchment river				Elevation at confluence	River mouth	Coordinates	River length
	Tributary			Elevation at confluence	River mouth	Coordinates	River length
		Tributary		Elevation at confluence	River mouth	Coordinates	River length
			Tributary	Elevation at confluence	River mouth	Coordinates	River length
Murrumbidgee River				55 m (180 ft)	Murray	34°43′43″S 143°13′8″E	~900 km (559 mi)
	Numeralla River			706 m (2,316 ft)	Murrumbidgee	36°3′56″S 149°9′1″E	94 km (58 mi)
		Kybeyan River		745 m (2,444 ft)	Numeralla	36°13′13″S 149°21′25″E	36 km (22 mi)
		Big Badja River		735 m (2,411 ft)	Numeralla	36°10′27″S 149°20′52″E	94 km (58 mi)
	Bredbo River				Murrumbidgee		
		Strike-a-Light River			Bredbo		
	Gudgenby River				Murrumbidgee		
		Naas River			Gudgenby		
		Orroral River			Gudgenby		
	Cotter River				Murrumbidgee		
		Paddys River			Cotter		
			Tidbinbilla River		Paddys		
			Gibraltar Creek		Paddys		
	Molonglo River				Murrumbidgee		
		Jerrabomberra Creek			Molonglo		
		Sullivans Creek			Molonglo		
		Queanbeyan River			Molonglo		
	Goodradigbee River			345 m (1,132 ft)	Murrumbidgee	35°00′S 148°38′E	105 km (65 mi)
	Yass River			345 m (1,132 ft)	Murrumbidgee	34°52′36″S 148°46′55″E	139 km (86 mi)
	Tumut River			220 m (722 ft)	Murrumbidgee	35°1′18″S 148°10′51″E	182 km (113 mi)
		Goobarragandra River		272 m (892 ft)	Tumut	35°20′S 148°15′E	56 km (35 mi)
		Doubtful Creek		1,290 m (4,232 ft)	Tumut	36°06′S 148°26′E	15 km (9 mi)
	Lachlan River			68 m (223 ft)	Murrumbidgee	34°22′S 143°47′E	~1,440 km (895 mi)
		Crookwell River		430 m (1,411 ft)	Lachlan	34°16′39″S 149°7′53″E	78 km (48 mi)
		Abercrombie River		378 m (1,240 ft)	Lachlan	34°01′S 149°28′E	130 km (81 mi)
			Bolong River	569 m (1,867 ft)	Abercrombie	34°08′S 149°37′E	60 km (37 mi)
			Isabella River	479 m (1,572 ft)	Abercrombie	34°00′S 149°39′E	51 km (32 mi)
		Boorowa River		303 m (994 ft)	Lachlan	33°57′S 148°50′E	134 km (83 mi)
		Belubula River		263 m (863 ft)	Lachlan	33°33′S 148°28′E	165 km (103 mi)

== Population centres ==
- Tharwa
- Canberra particularly Tuggeranong
- Jugiong
- Gundagai
- Wantabadgery
- Wagga Wagga
- Narrandera
- Yanco
- Leeton
- Darlington Point
- Hay
- Balranald

== River crossings ==
The list below notes past and present bridges that cross over the Murrumbidgee River. There were numerous other crossings before the bridges were constructed and many of these still exist today.

=== Downstream from Wagga Wagga ===
Crossing	Image	Coordinates	Built	Location	Description	Notes
Balranald Bridge		34°38′47.2″S 143°33′56.6″E	1973	Balranald	Sturt Highway	
Matthews Bridge		34°28′40″S 144°18′03.4″E	1957	Maude		Work started on a replacement for this bridge in 2020.
Hay Bridge		34°30′58.4″S 144°50′32.4″E	1973	Hay	Cobb Highway	
Carrathool Bridge		34°26′57.4″S 145°25′02.3″E	1924	Carrathool		
Darlington Point Bridge		34°34′01.2″S 146°00′09.5″E	1979	Darlington Point	Kidman Way	
Euroley Bridge		34°38′19.6″S 146°22′25.8″E	2003	Yanco		
Narrandera Rail Bridge		34°45′30.7″S 146°32′08.5″E	1885	Narrandera	Tocumwal railway line	Not in use
Narrandera Bridge		34°45′20.8″S 146°32′53.7″E		Narrandera	Newell Highway	
Collingullie Bridge		35°01′59.3″S 147°06′29.6″E		Collingullie		

=== Wagga Wagga to Burrinjuck ===
Crossing	Image	Coordinates	Built	Location	Description	Notes
Gobbagombalin Bridge			1997	Wagga Wagga	Olympic Highway	
Wiradjuri Bridge			1995	Wagga Wagga	Hampden Avenue, replaced the Hampden Bridge	
Hampden Bridge			1895	Wagga Wagga	Demolished in 2014	
Murrumbidgee River; Rail Bridge			2006	Wagga Wagga	Main Southern railway line. Replaced the previous bridge built in 1881	
Eunony Bridge			1975 and 2020	Wagga Wagga	Eunony Bridge Road, top bridge decking replaced in 2020 with the original pylons	
Low Bridge		35°04′42.3″S 147°49′17.7″E		Mundarlo		
Sheahan Bridge		35°04′05.9″S 148°05′42.8″E	1977 and 2009	Gundagai	The bridge was duplicated in 2009. Photograph shows Hume Highway; looking south from Gundagai, bridge in mid distance.	
Gundagai Rail Bridge		35°04′23.7″S 148°06′16.2″E	1902	Gundagai	Tumut railway line, now disused	
Prince Alfred Bridge		35°04′27.8″S 148°06′24.8″E	1867	Gundagai	Prince Alfred Road, former Hume Highway. Main iron spans at southern end still in use for local traffic. Northern wooden spans now disused and in dilapidated condition.	
Gobarralong Bridge		34°59′34.2″S 148°14′13.2″E		Gobarralong		
Jugiong Bridge		34°49′30.3″S 148°19′55.6″E		Jugiong		

=== Upstream from Burrinjuck ===
Crossing	Image	Coordinates	Location	Description	Notes
Taemas Bridge		35°00′12.7″S 148°50′53.2″E	Wee Jasper	1930	
Uriarra Crossing		35°14′38.0″S 148°57′07.1″E	Uriarra		
Cotter Road bridge		35°19′22.2″S 148°57′01.4″E	Australian Capital Territory		Cotter Road, near the confluence with the Cotter River
Point Hut crossing		35°27′07.1″S 149°04′25.4″E	Gordon		
Tharwa Bridge		35°30′30.9″S 149°04′13.9″E	Tharwa	1895	
Angle Crossing		35°34′59.0″S 149°06′32.6″E	Williamsdale		Angle Crossing Road, a ford
Bumbalong Bridge		35°51′31.266″S 149°08′4.780″E	Colinton		Little known and little used, low-level bridge that links the otherwise isolated locality of Bumbalong to the locality of Colinton. Bumbalong Road connects the local road from the bridge to the Monaro Highway at Colinton.
Billilingra Bridge		36°00′04.2″S 149°07′59.6″E	Billilingra		
Binjura Bridge		36°10′13.4″S 149°05′28.1″E	Binjura		
Bolaro Bridge		35°58′50.0″S 148°50′24.5″E	Bolaro		
Yaouk Bridge		35°49′34.1″S 148°48′10.9″E	Yaouk		
Tantangara Bridge		35°47′58.2″S 00°40′34.0″E	Tantangara		Tantangara Road, immediately downstream from the Tantangara Reservoir wall
Tantangara Dam		35°47′43.7″S 148°39′47.5″E	Tantangara		Tantangara Reservoir was constructed between 1958 and 1960. No public access to the dam to cross the river.
Long Plain Bridge			Long Plain		

== Images ==
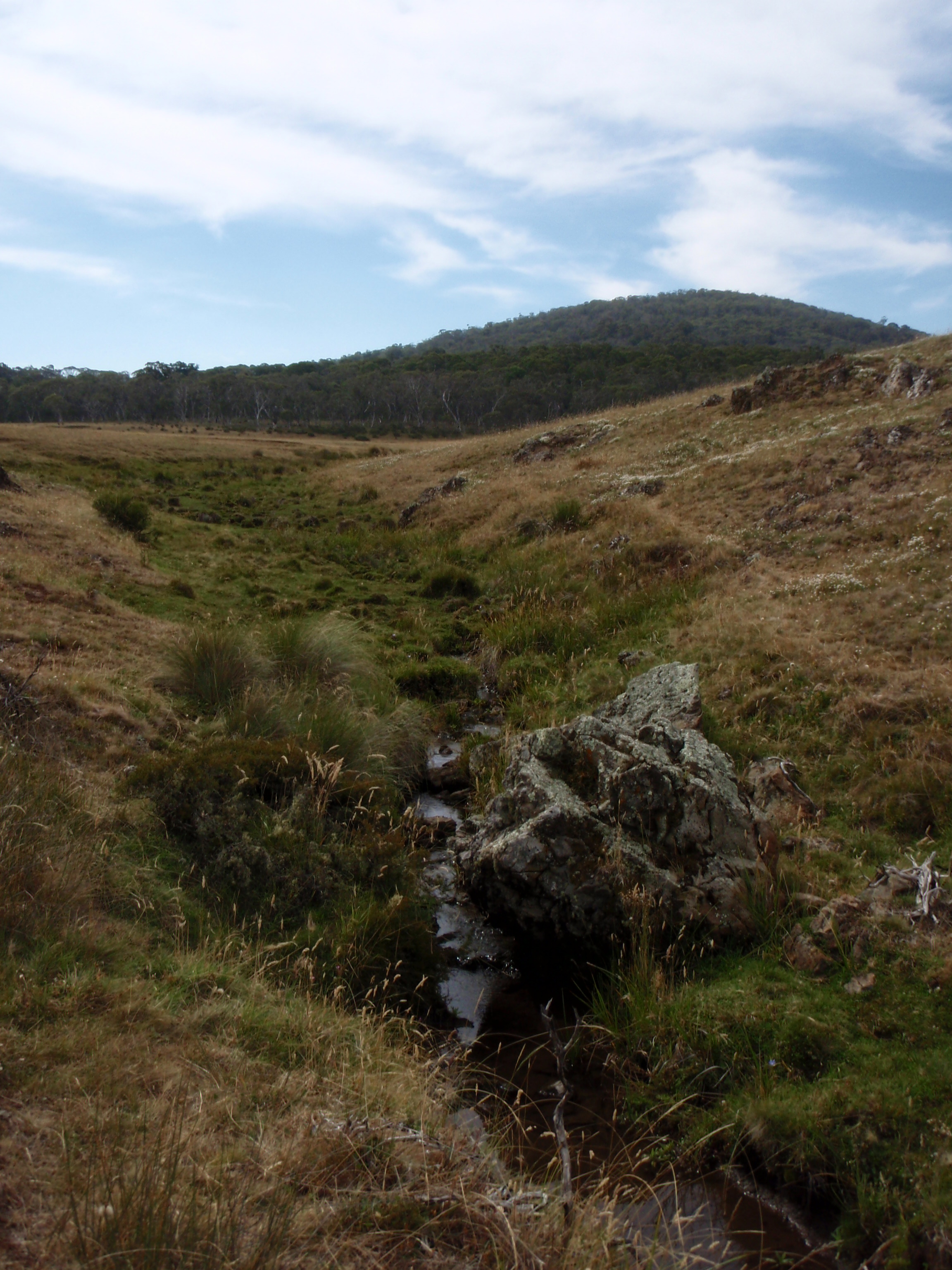
Second photo of source and area of Murrumbidgee

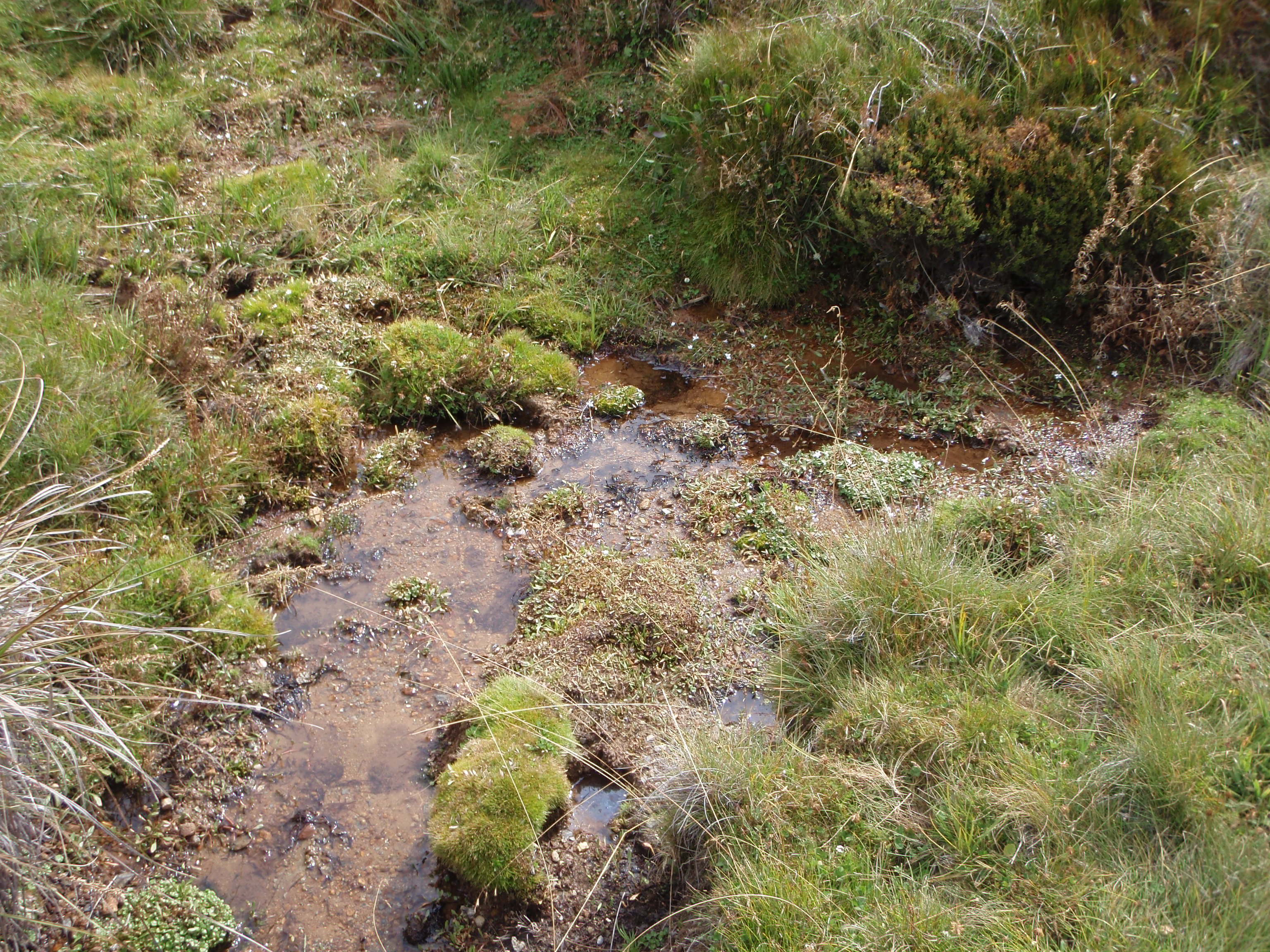
Water oozing from heath at source area of Murrumbidgee

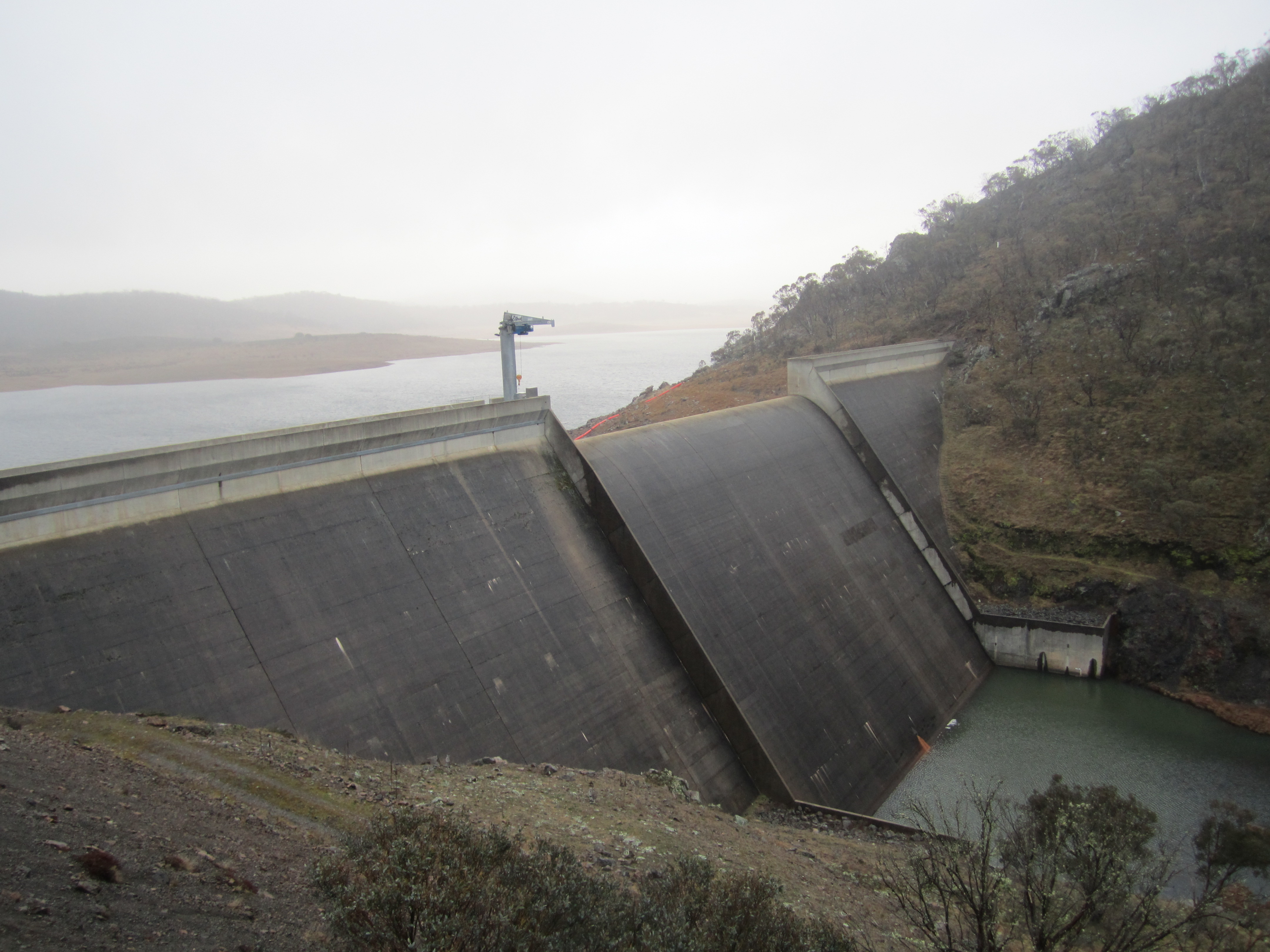
Tantangara Dam

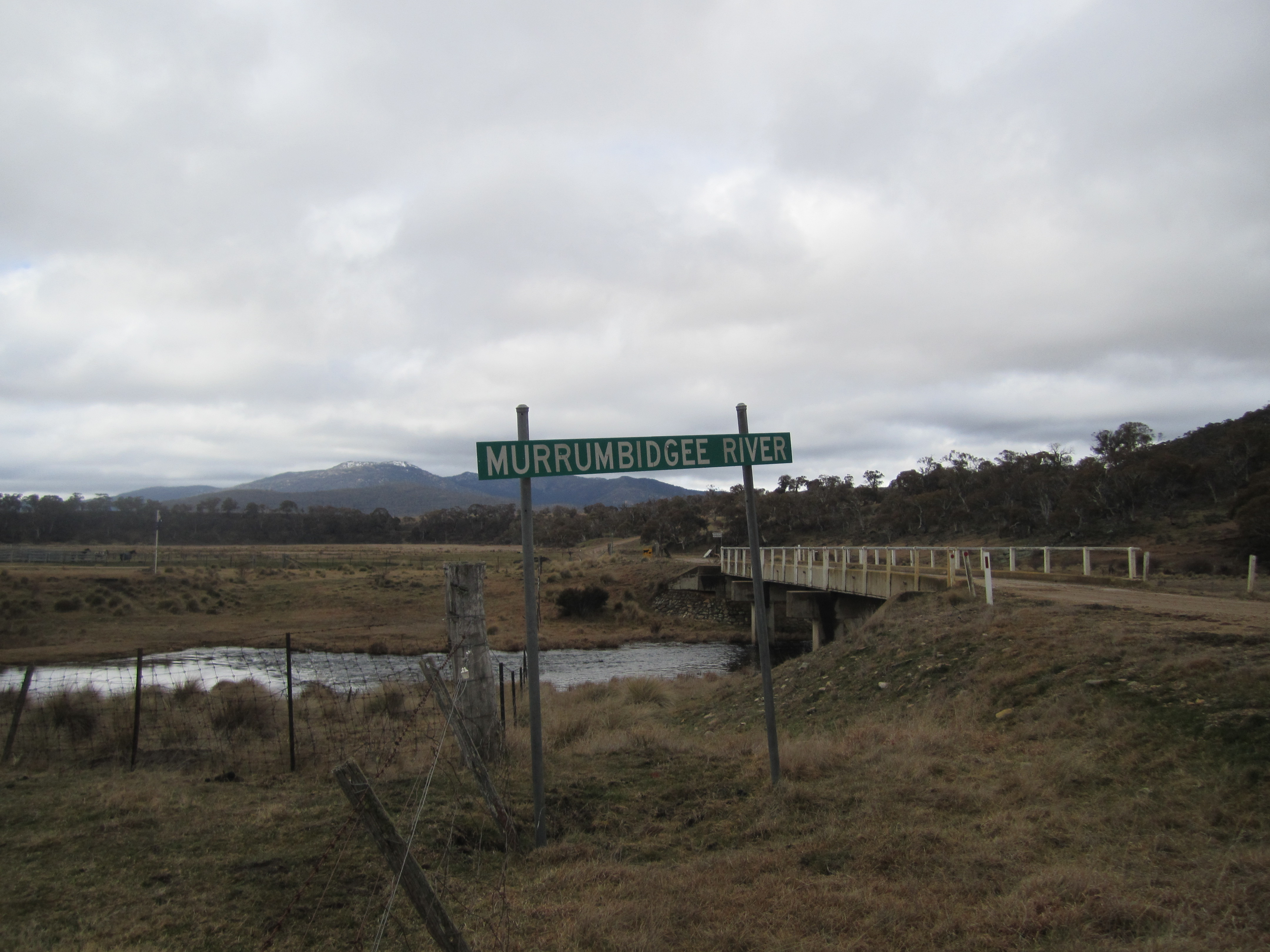
Yaouk Bridge

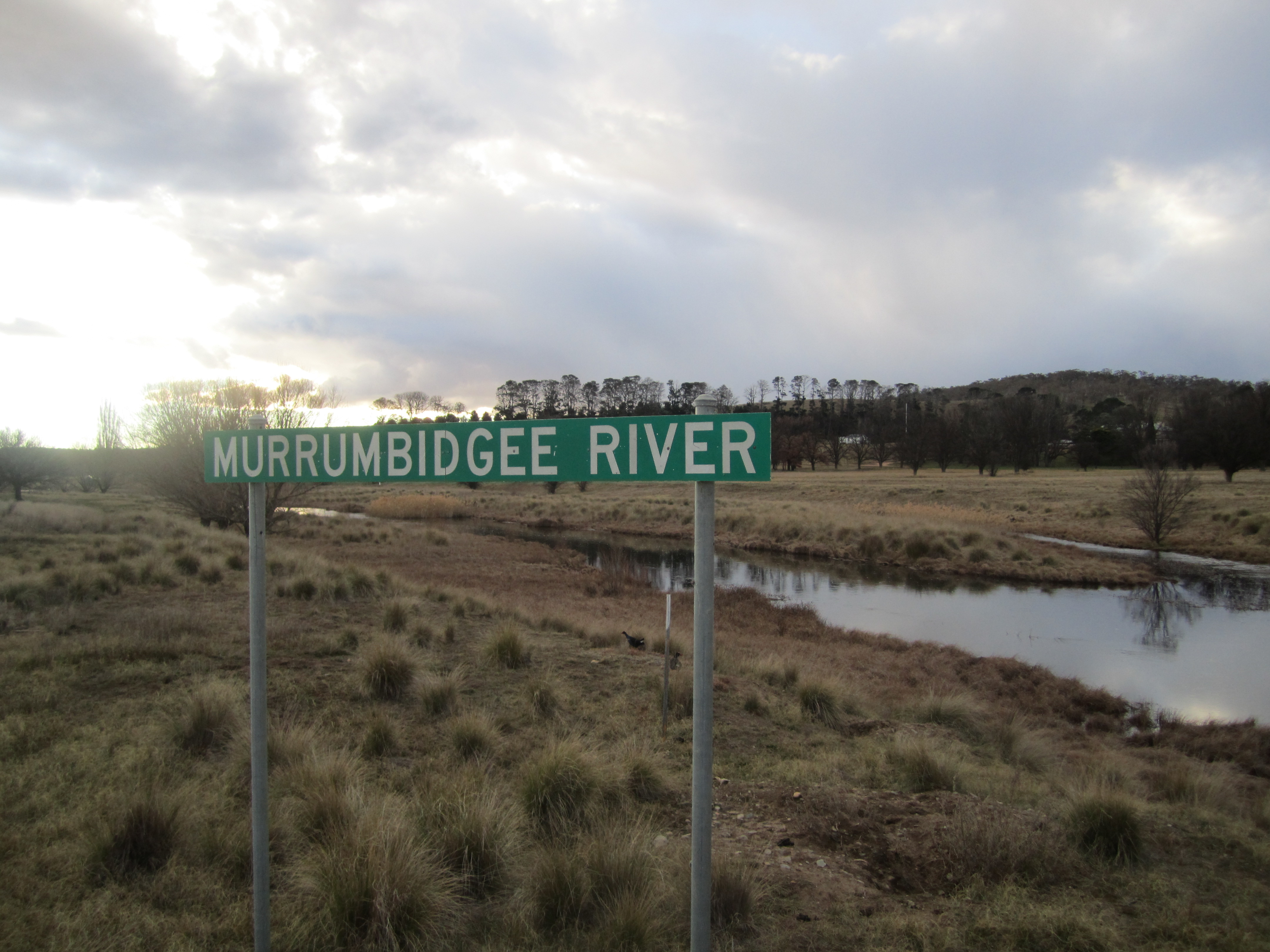
Murrumbidgee at Bolaro

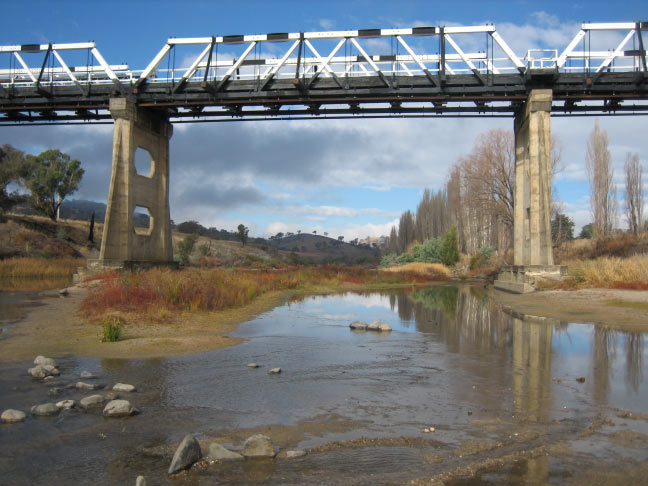
Tharwa Bridge looking south; Tharwa is to the right

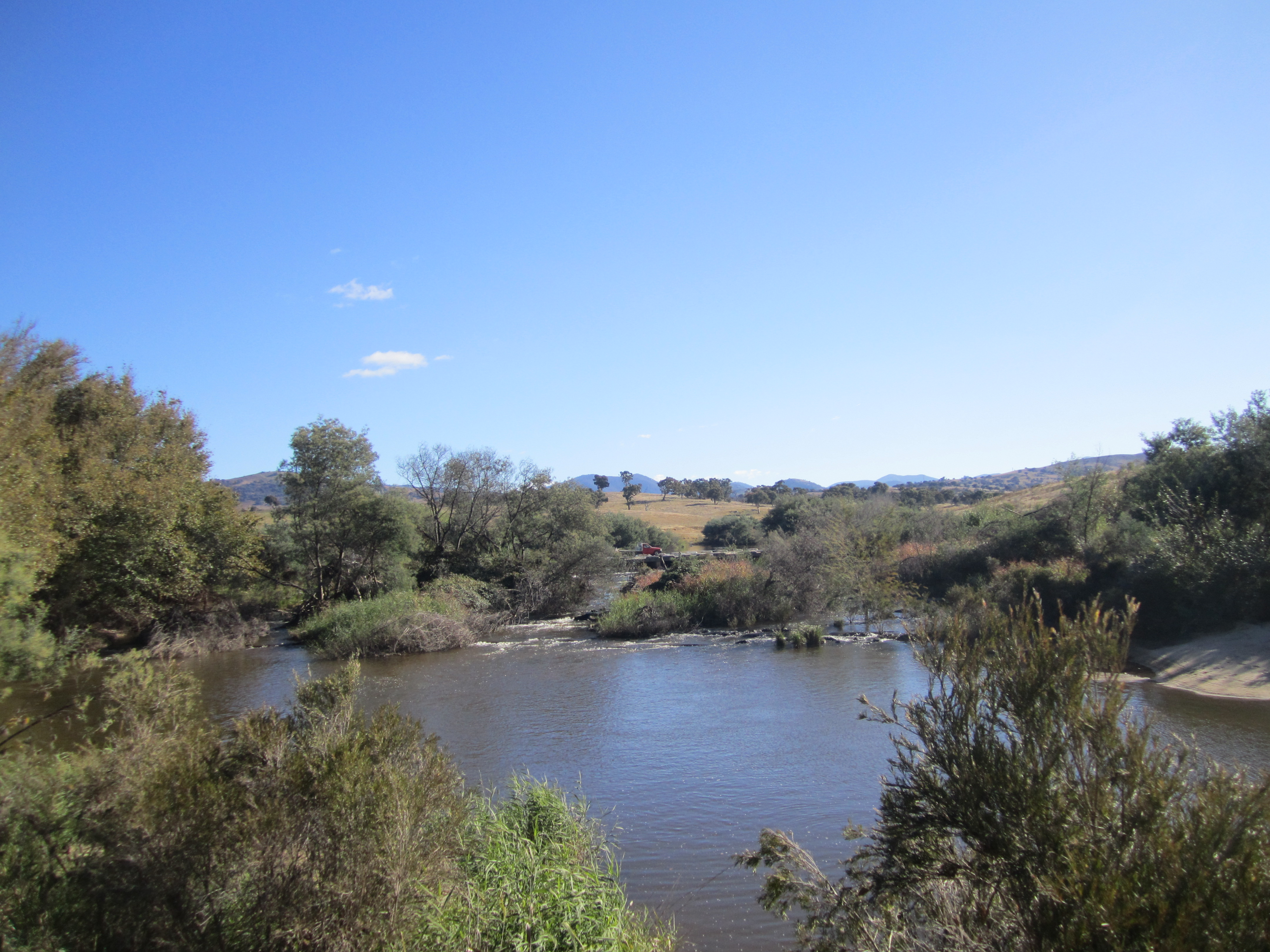
Point Hut Crossing, ACT, looking south

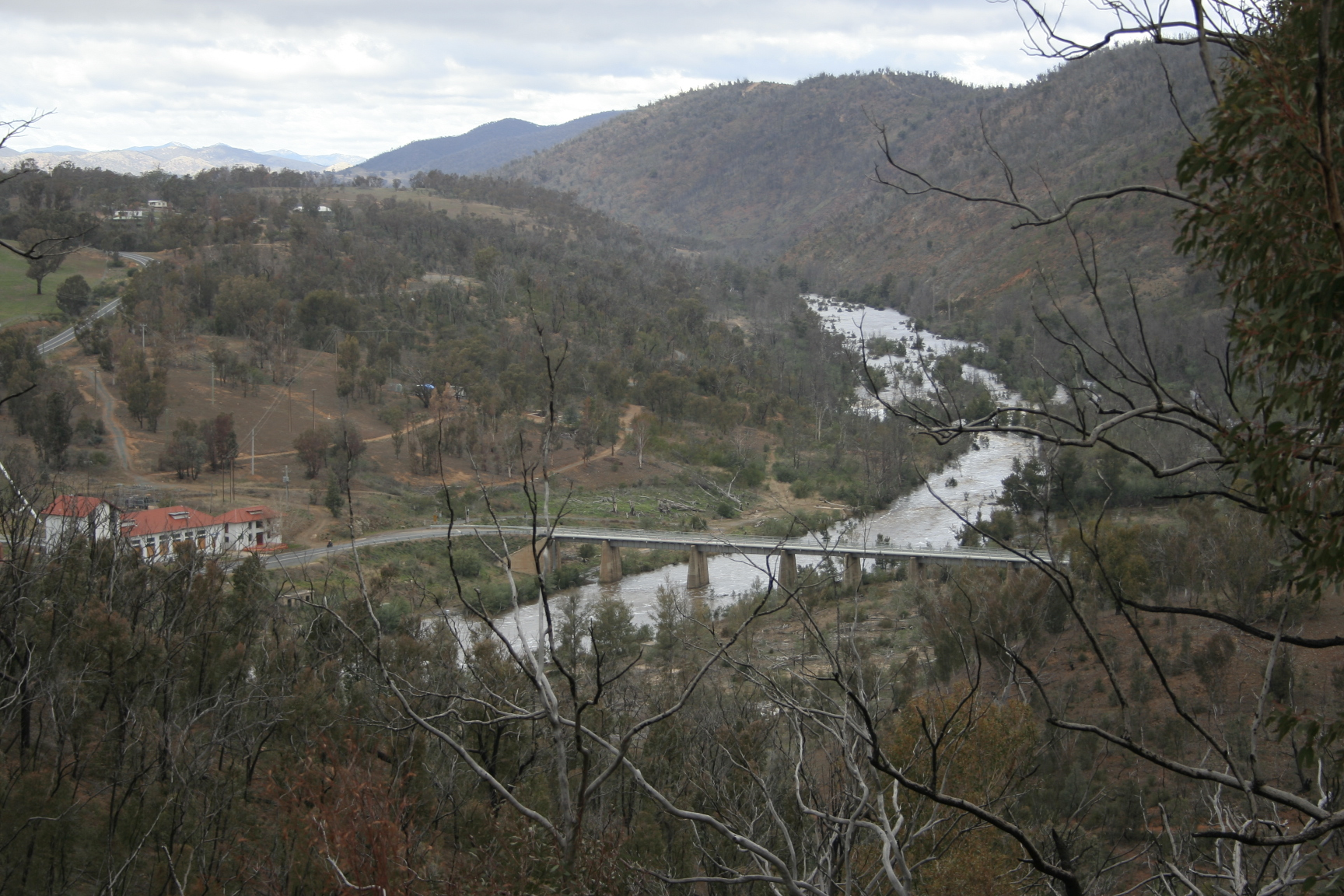
Junction with Cotter, in moderate flood

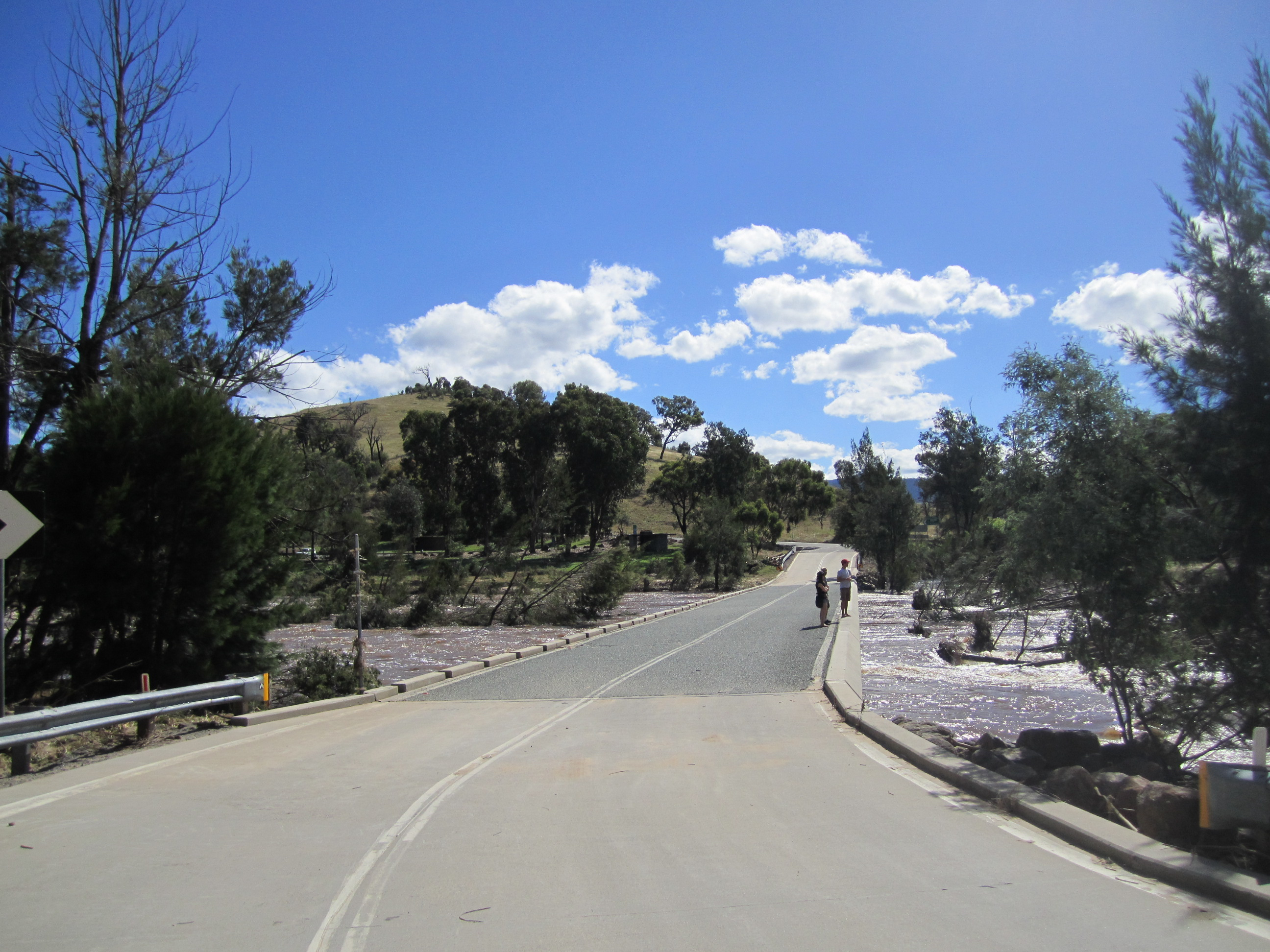
Uriarra Crossing, ACT, in moderate flood

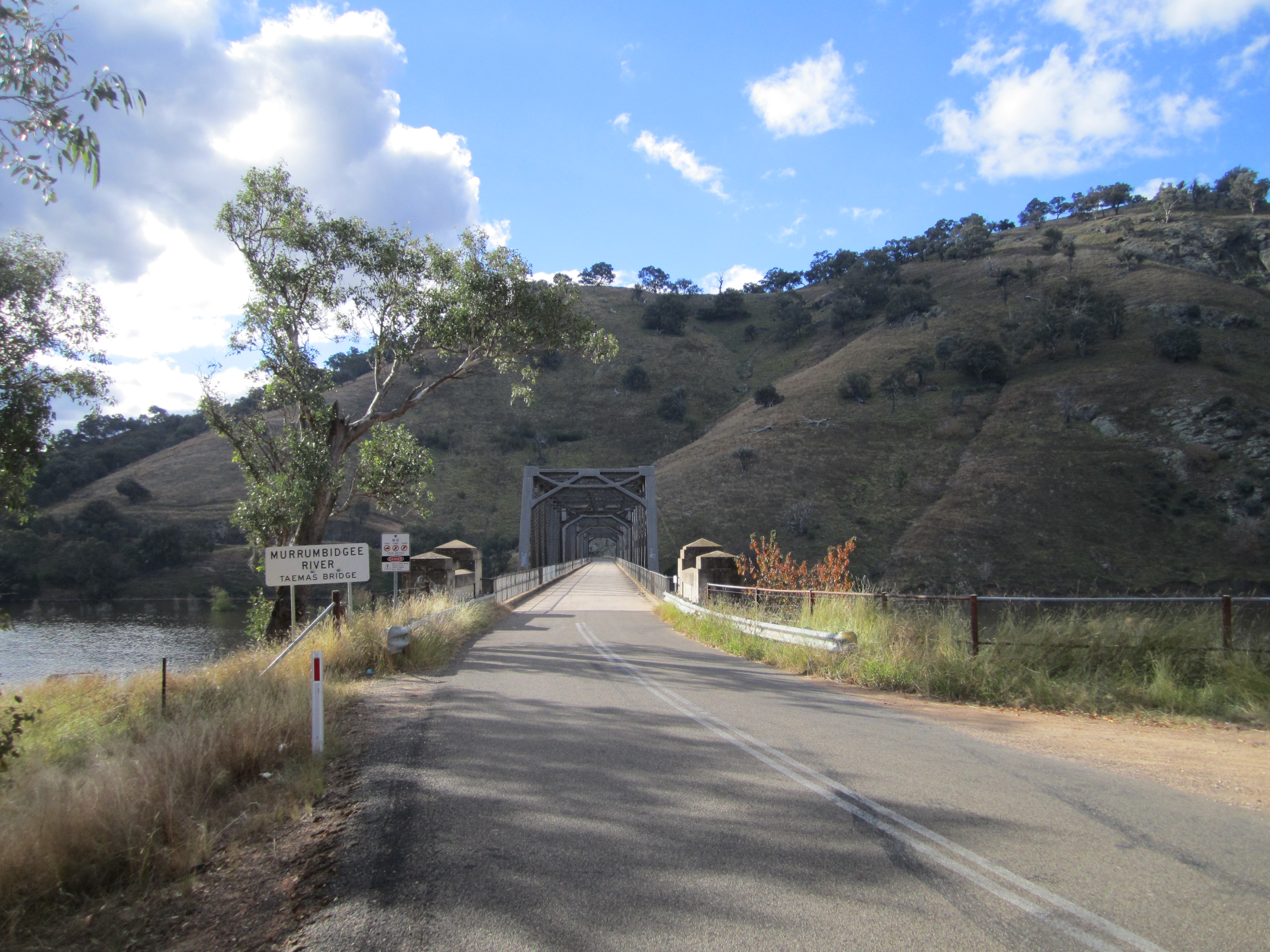
Approach to Taemas Bridge

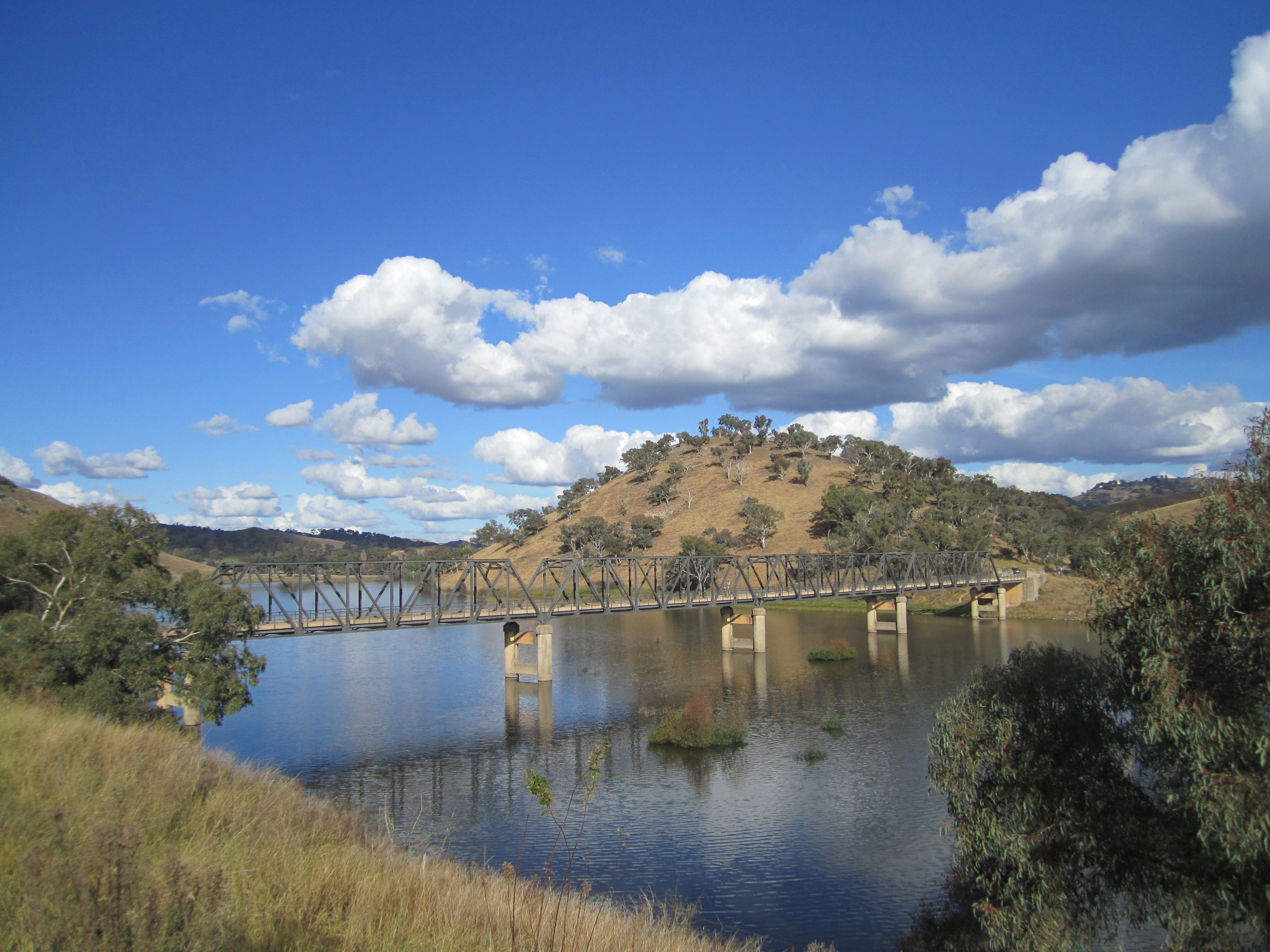
Taemas Bridge, from north

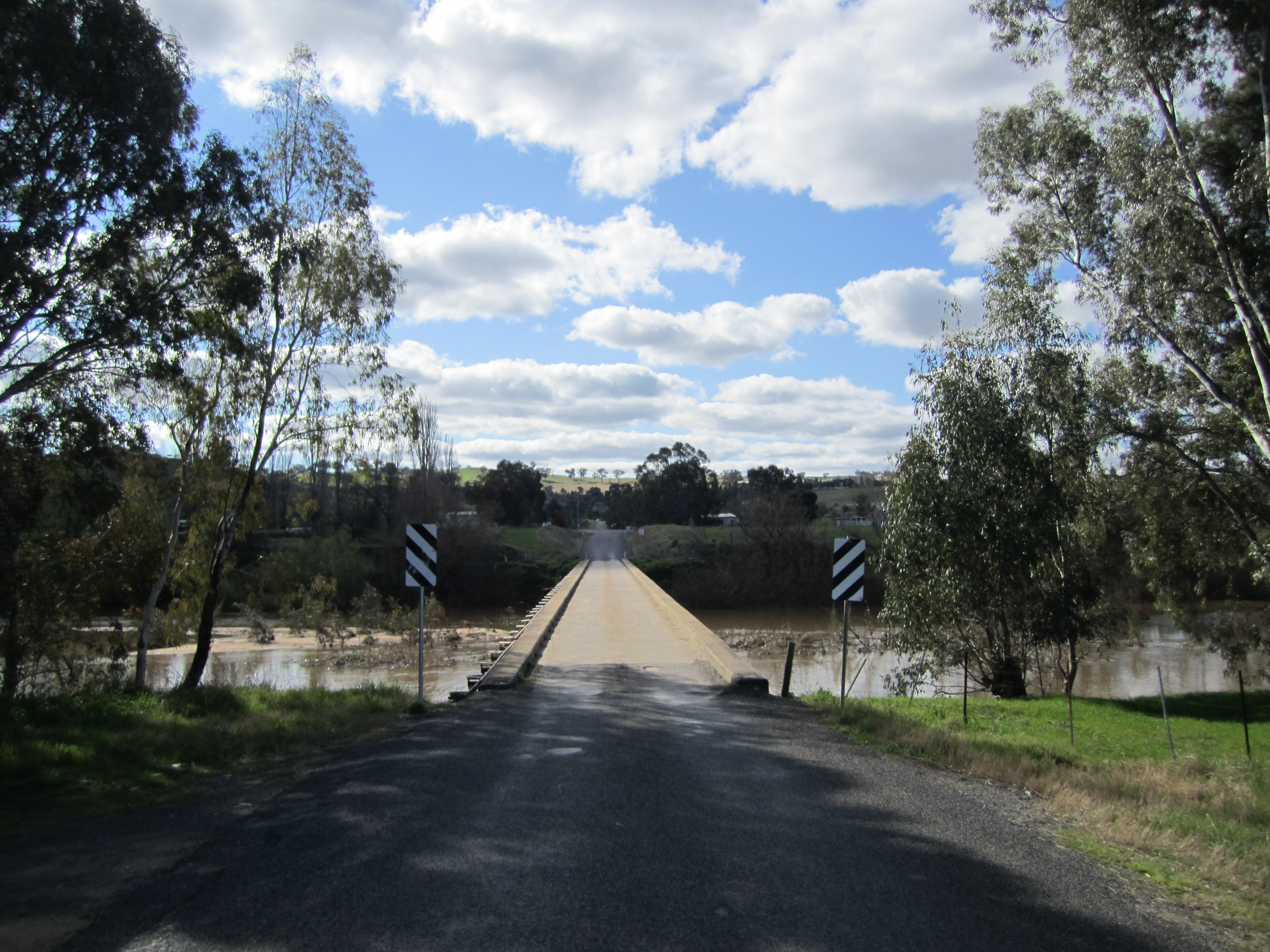
Jugiong Bridge

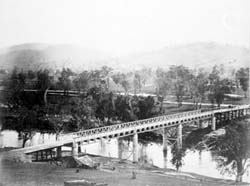
The Prince Alfred bridge crosses the Murrumbidgee River at Gundagai, photographed c. 1885

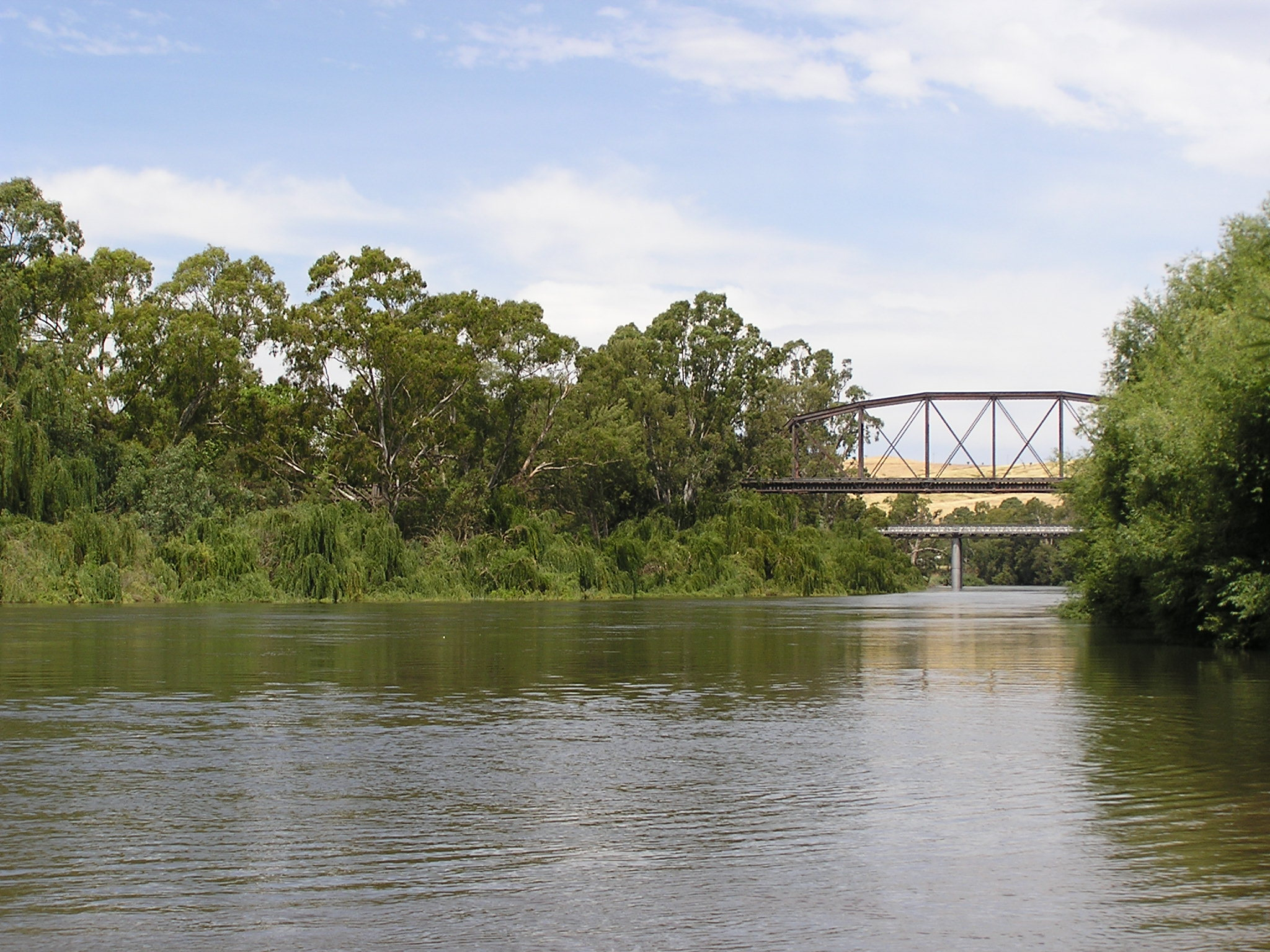
The Murrumbidgee at Gundagai

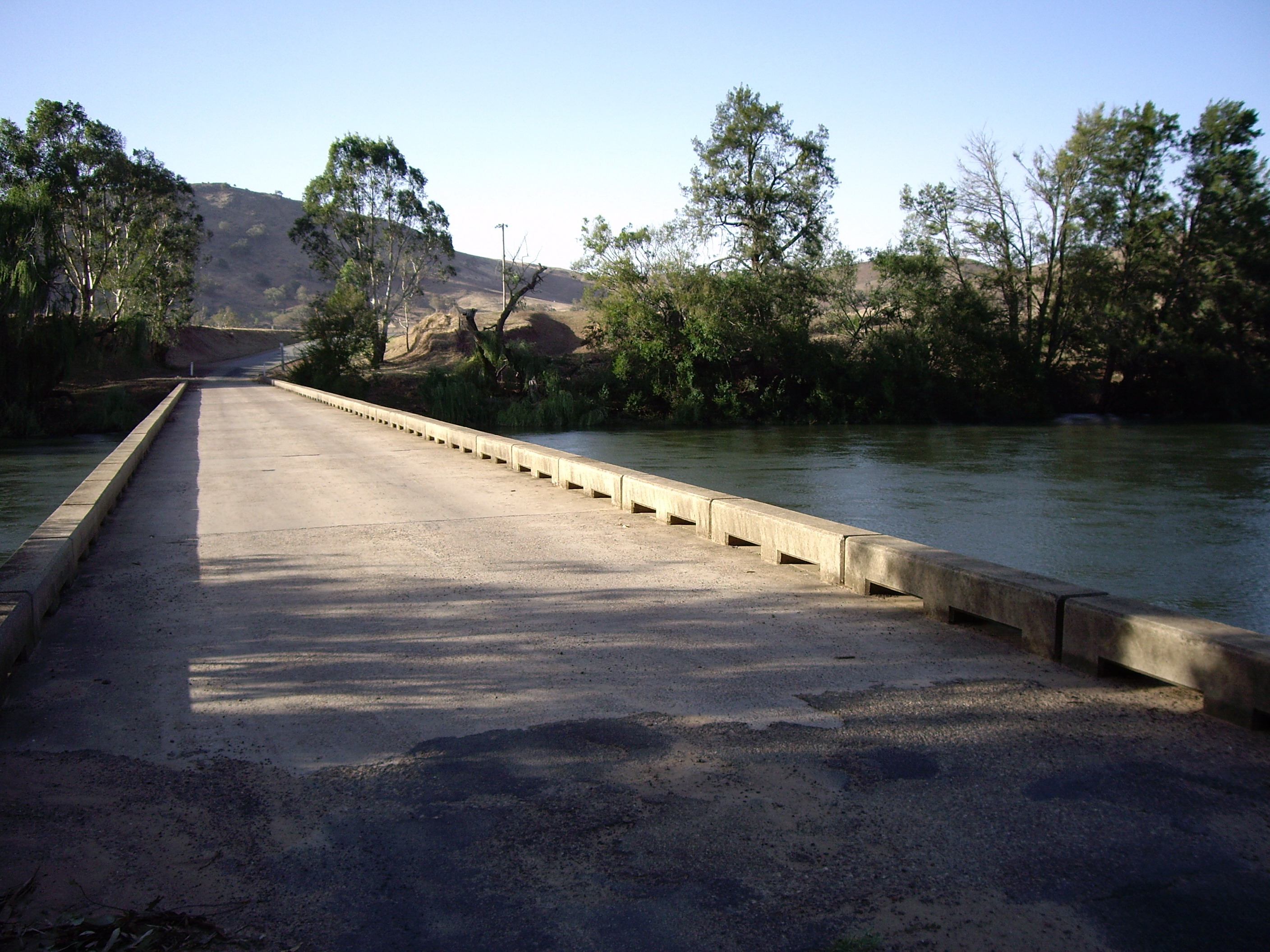
Murrumbidgee River Crossing at Mundarlo

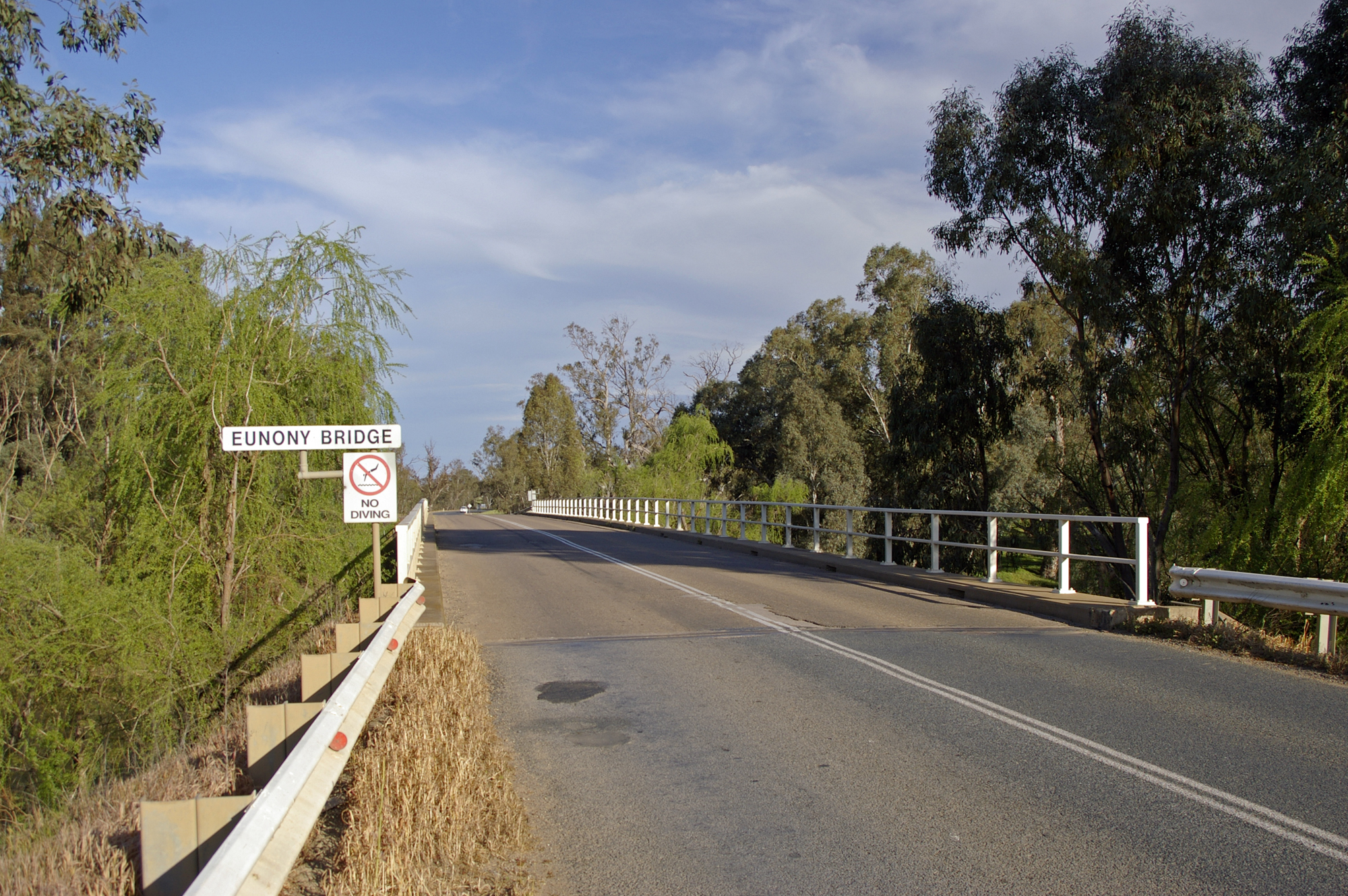
Eunony Bridge viewed from Eunanoreenya looking towards Gumly Gumly

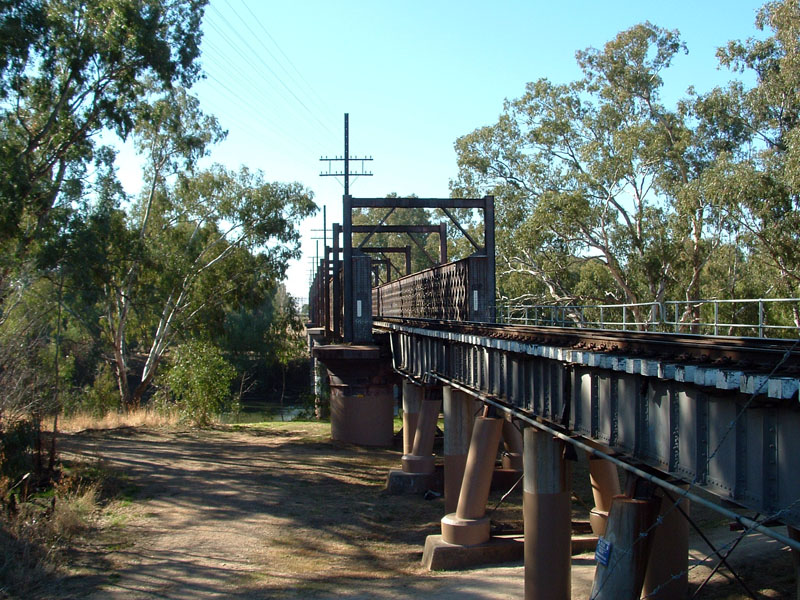
Former Wagga Wagga railway bridge

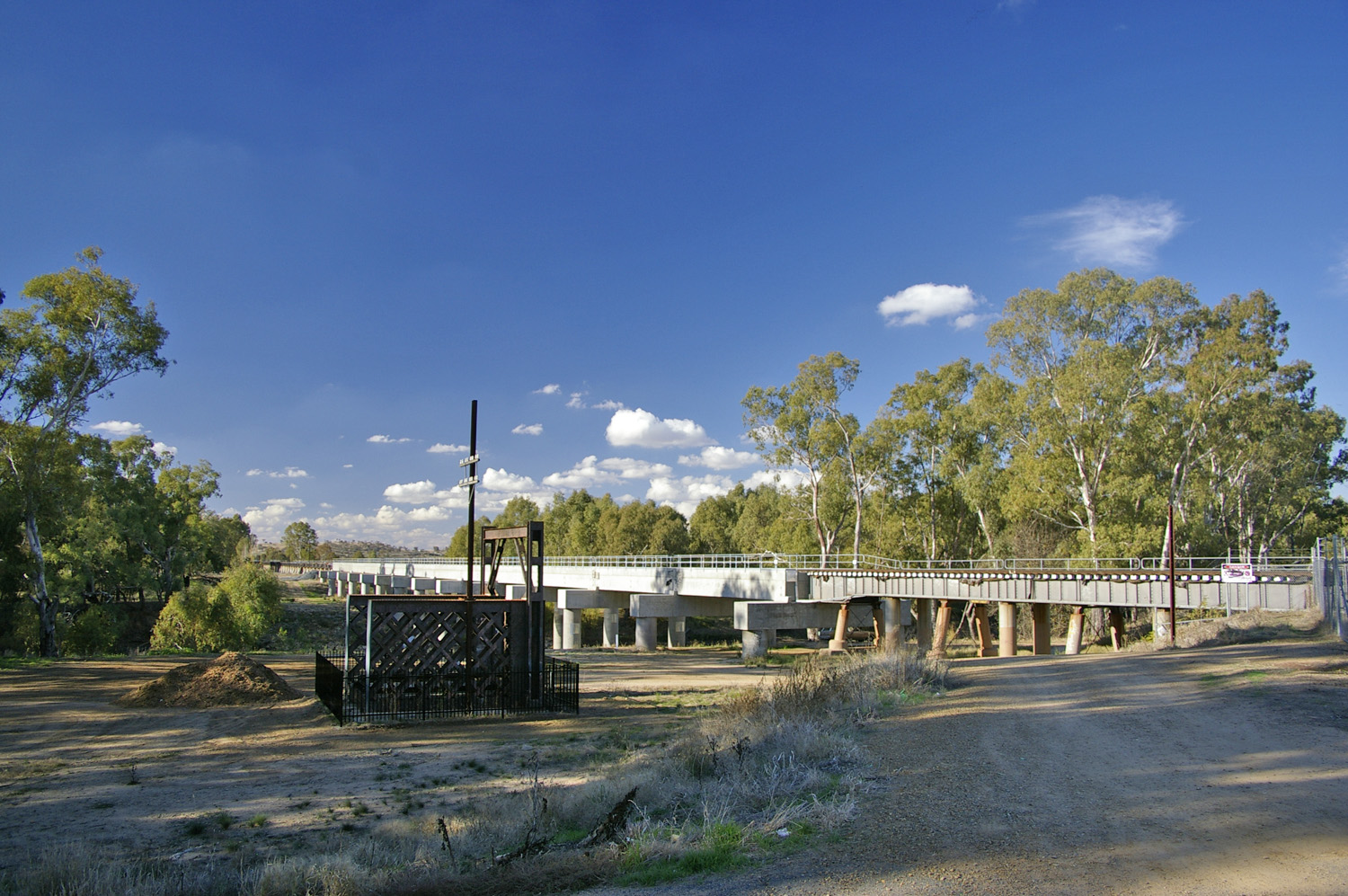
New concrete railway bridge at Wagga Wagga

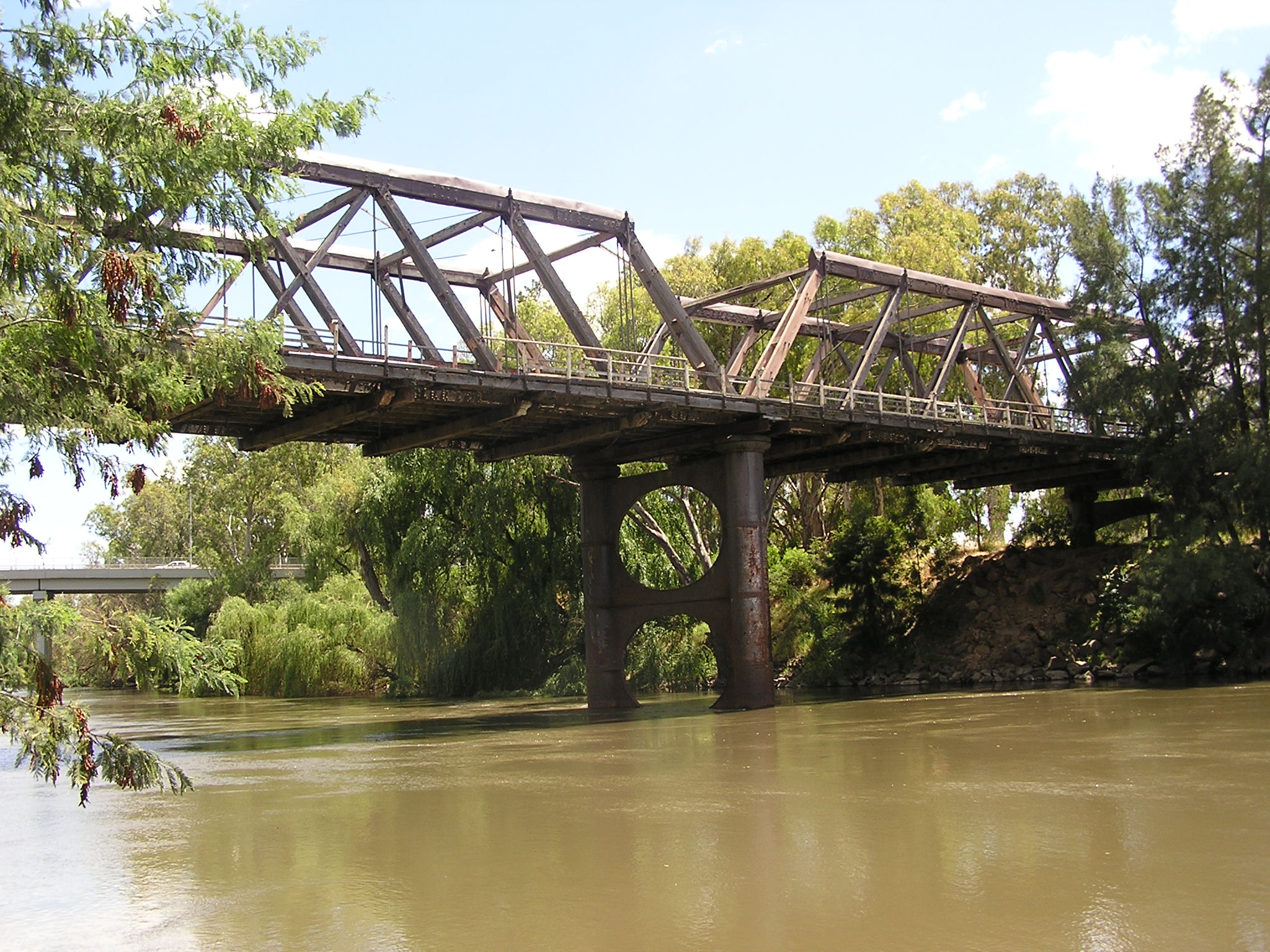
Hampden Bridge at Wagga Wagga

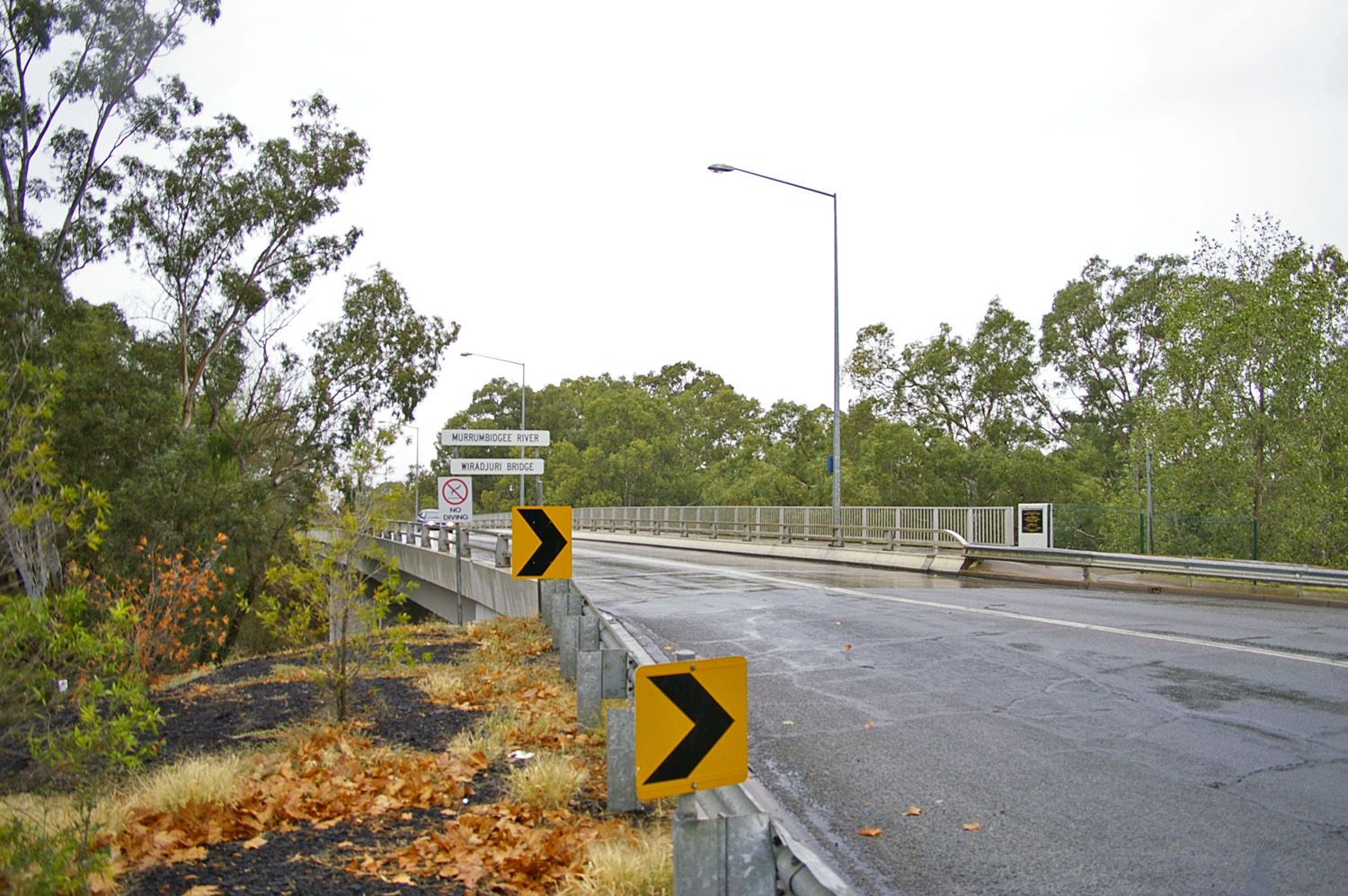
Wiradjuri Bridge

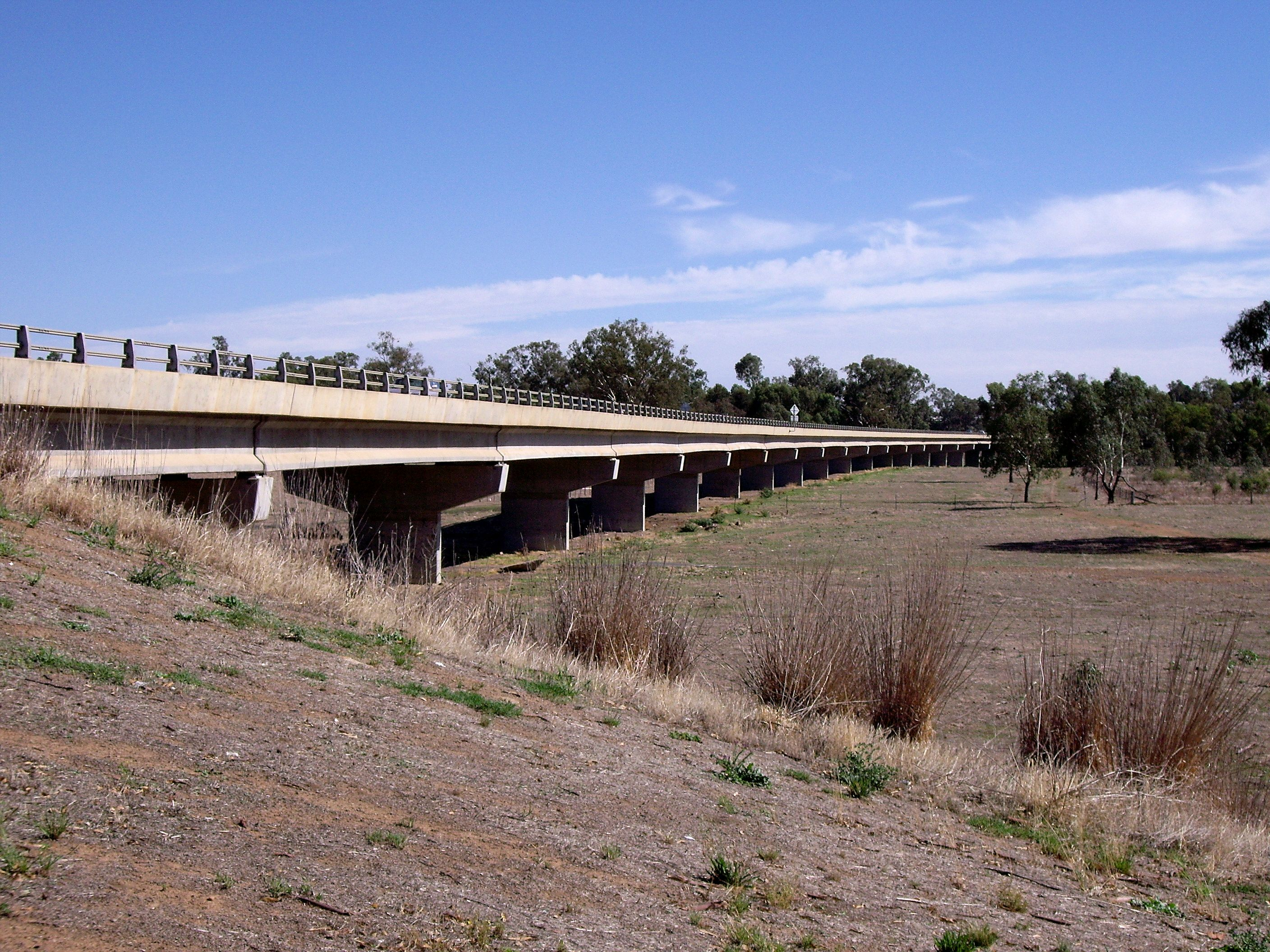
Gobbagombalin (Gobba) Bridge

== Distances along the river ==
- Gundagai to Wagga Wagga – 138 km (86 mi)
- Wagga Wagga to Yarragundy – 37 km (23 mi)
- Yarragundy to Yiorkibitto – 77 km (48 mi)
- Yiorkibitto to Grong Grong – 58 km (36 mi)
- Grong Grong to Narrandera – 21 km (13 mi)
- Narrandera to Yanco or Bedithera – 18 km (11 mi)
- Yanco to Yanco Station – 29 km (18 mi)
- Yanco to Gogeldrie – 21 km (13 mi)
- Gogeldrie to Tubbo – 24 km (15 mi)
- Tubbo to Cararburry – 55 km (34 mi)
- Cararbury to Carrathool – 66 km (41 mi)
- Carrathool to Burrabogie – 56 km (35 mi)
- Burrabogie to Illilliwa – 42 km (26 mi)
- Illilliwa to Hay – 22 km (14 mi)
- Hay to Toogambie – 63 km (39 mi)
- Toogambie to Maude – 40 km (25 mi)
- Maude to Lachlan Junction – 71 km (44 mi)
- Lachlan Junction to Balranald – 137 km (85 mi)
- Balranald to Canally – 42 km (26 mi)
- Canally to Weimby, Murray Junction – 61 km (38 mi)
- Total distance from Gundagai to Murrumbidgee Junction – 1,078 km (670 mi)

== See also ==
- List of rivers of Australia § New South Wales
- List of rivers of Australia § Australian Capital Territory
- List of Murrumbidgee River distances
- List of Darling River distances
- List of crossings of the Murray River
- List of Murray River distances
- Murray–Darling basin includes useful chart of tributaries
