= Bumbalong =

- Town
- Interactive map of Bumbalong
- Coordinates: 35°51′30.9″S 149°08′01.4″E
- Country: Australia
- State: New South Wales
- Region: Monaro
- LGA: Snowy Monaro Regional Council
- Location: 72 km (45 mi) S of Canberra; 48 km (30 mi) N of Cooma; 356 km (221 mi) SW of Sydney

Government
  - State electorate: Monaro
  - Federal division: Eden-Monaro

Population
  - Total: 24 (2016 census)
- Postcode: 2626
- County: Cowley
- Parish: Bumbalong
Localities around Bumbalong
ACT	Clear Range	Michelago
ACT	Bumbalong	Colinton
Shannons Flat	Bredbo	Bredbo

Bumbalong is a rural locality in the Snowy Monaro Region, New South Wales, Australia. Although it lies in the valley of the Murrumbidgee River, it is sometimes referred to by its residents as Bumbalong Valley. At the 2016 census, it had a population of 24.

It occupies an area bounded in the east and south by the Murrumbidgee River, and in the west by the Australian Capital Territory border. To the north, the valley narrows, becoming Colinton Gorge. The Parish of Bumbalong once extended as far as the Naas River, but this western portion—part of the catchment of the Naas—became a part of the A.C.T. The settled area lies in the valley close to the left (western) bank of the Murrumbidgee River, opposite Colinton.

The area now known as Bumbalong lies on the traditional lands of Ngarigo people.

The presence of gold was recorded in the southern part of the locality, on the land inland from the large bend in the river. Although there was gold mining, nearby, on the eastern side of the river, at Colinton, no mining at Bumbalong seems to be recorded. The locality is agricultural, with activities including grazing.

The only road connection is from the Monaro Highway at Colinton, via Bumbalong Road and the Bumbalong Bridge across the Murrumbidgee. The bridge is a low-level concrete structure that is covered during floods, isolating the locality. In earlier times, the only river crossing was a ford. Bumbalong locality is on the western side of the river only and has no roads open to the public. Bumbalong Road ceases at an intersection of a right of carriageway that runs generally parallel to the river. The right of carriageway, designated as Upstream Road and Downstream Road, commences at the western end of the concrete crossing; it passes through private land, over its entire length, in both upstream and downstream directions, and is for private use of residents only.

Bumbalong was badly affected by the Clear Range bushfire, on 1 February 2020, losing six of its 14 dwellings.
