= Illilawa =

- Town
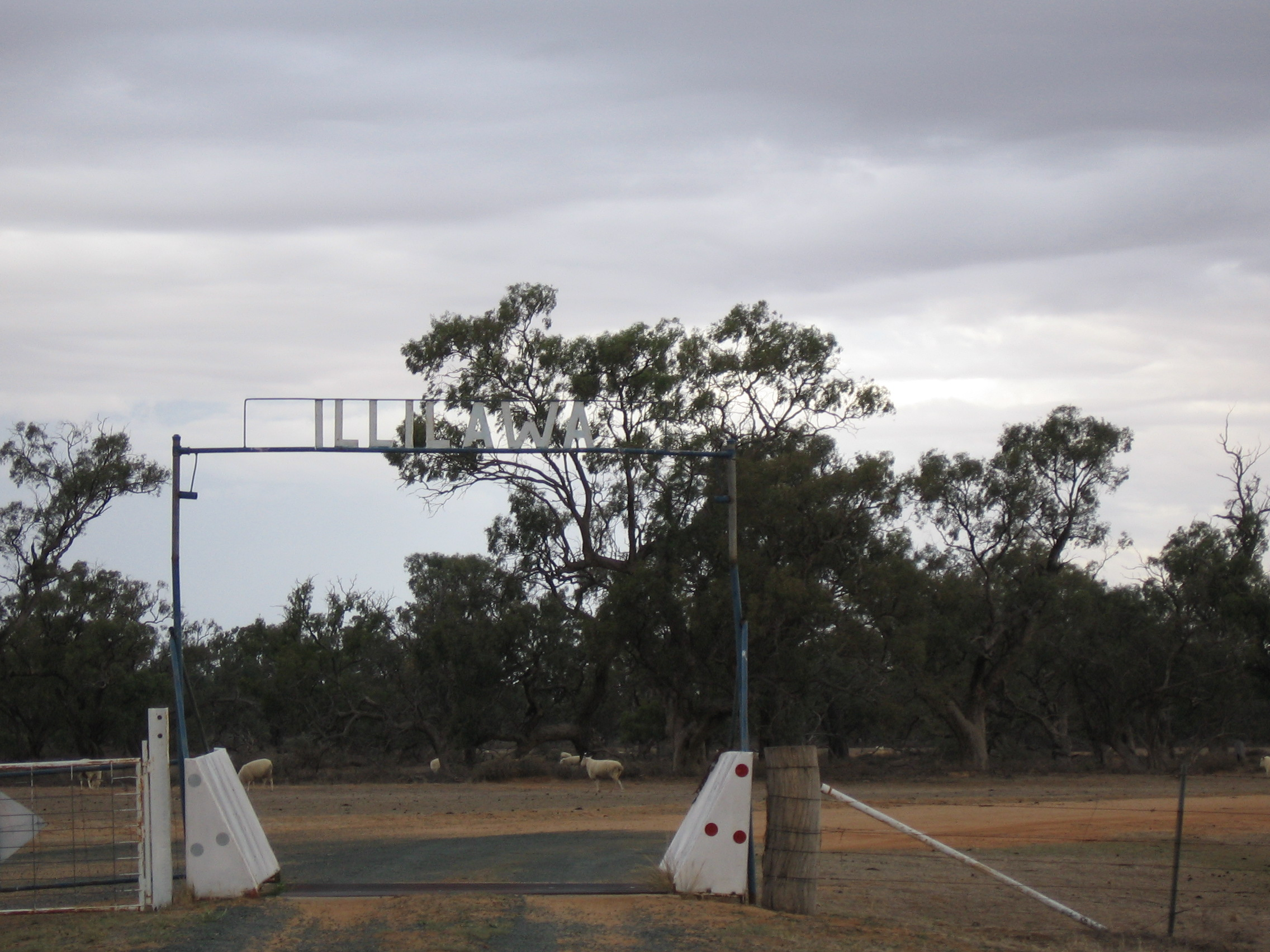
- Illilawa station entrance

- Coordinates: 34°28′50″S 144°58′39″E
- Country: Australia
- State: New South Wales
- LGA: Hay Shire
- Location: 18 km (11 mi) from Hay; 48 km (30 mi) from Gunbar

Government
  - State electorate: Murray
  - Federal division: Farrer
- Elevation: 86 m (282 ft)
- Postcode: 2711
- County: Waradgery

Illilawa is a locality in the central part of the Riverina, in New South Wales, Australia. It is located along the Murrumbidgee River in the Hay Local Government Area. Its population is unknown, due to its small size it was not counted separately on Australia's most recent census.

Other than private residences and buildings in the area of the small rural population, Illilawa is the site of a disused railway station.
