= Bunyan, New South Wales =

Bunyan
- Town
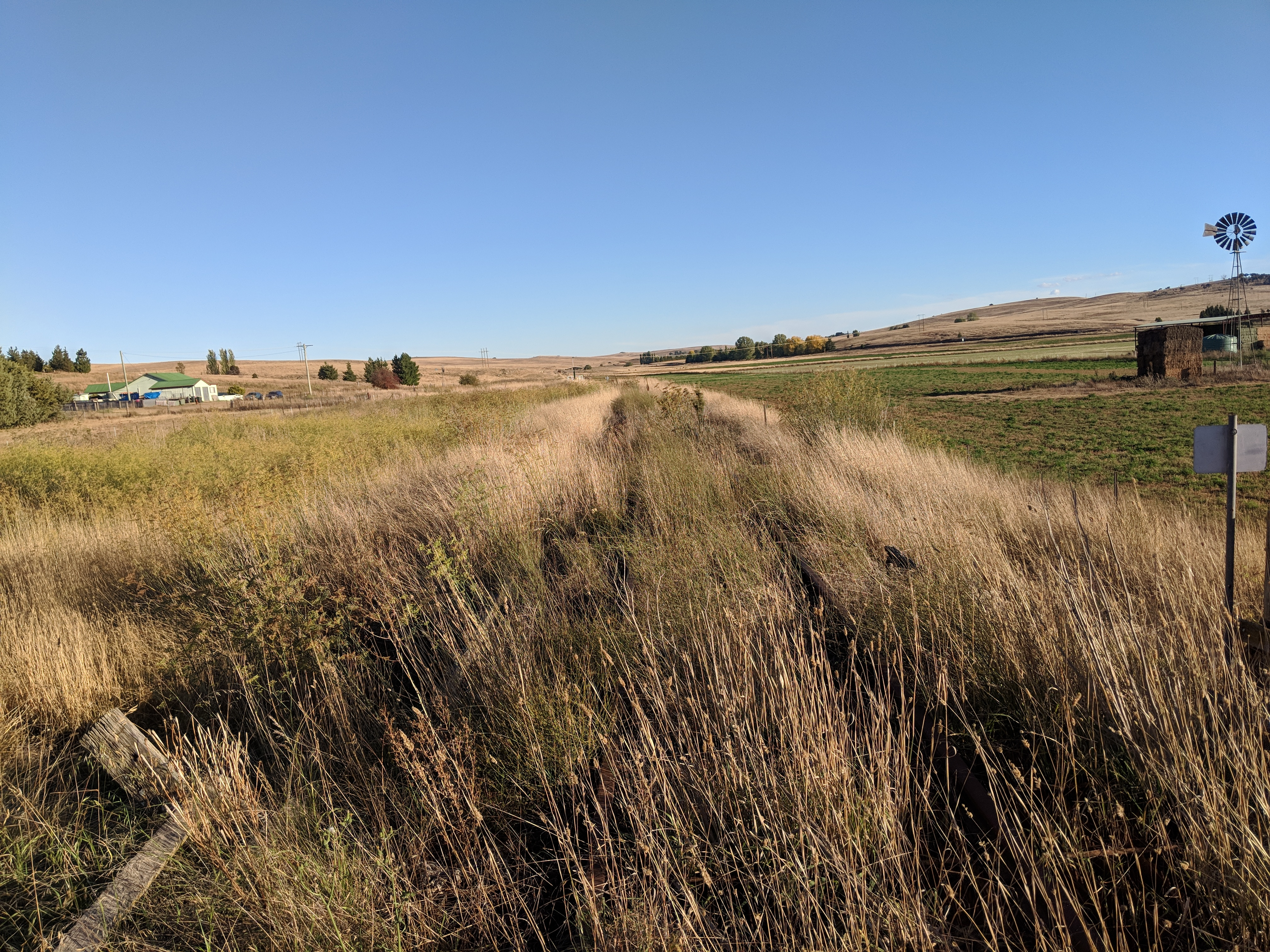
- Closed Bombala railway line, looking towards Bunyan station

- Coordinates: 36°09′57″S 149°09′02″E
- Country: Australia
- State: New South Wales
- Region: Monaro
- LGA: Snowy Monaro Regional Council
- Location: 110 km (68 mi) S of Canberra; 10 km (6.2 mi) N of Cooma; 391 km (243 mi) SW of Sydney

Government
  - State electorate: Monaro
  - Federal division: Eden-Monaro
- Elevation: 744 m (2,441 ft)

Population
  - Total: 192 (SAL 2021)
- Postcode: 2630
- County: Beresford
- Parish: Bunyan
Localities around Bunyan
Murrumbucca	Chakola	Rose Valley
Murrumbucca	Bunyan	Numeralla
Binjura	Cooma	Middle Flat

Bunyan is a locality in the Snowy Monaro Region, New South Wales, Australia. It lies on the eastern side of the Murrumbidgee River and on both sides of the Monaro Highway about 110 km south of Canberra and about 10 km north of Cooma. At the 2016 census, it had a population of 152.

The area now known as Bunyan lies on the traditional lands of Ngarigo people. The name is said by some to be from an Aboriginal language word, Boonyan, meaning "Place where pigeons stay". However, in the mid 19th century settlers were far more likely to use the surname of the 17th century author of The Pilgrim's Progress, at that time one of the most widely read and widely known books. The surname goes back to the 11th or 12th century and to Norman settlers near Bedford from whom the author was descended, the name spelt in various ways, but originally Buignon, a surname still found in France today although very rare.

Lying on the direct route from Queanbeyan to the Monaro hinterland and with flats suited to grazing, Bunyan was a suitable site for colonial settlement. The first settler there was Dr Reid, in the early 1830s, and the area was known as Reid's Flats until 1858. There was an inn there from around 1832. The area was also known locally as 'Jews' Flats'. From the 1830s until at least the mid-1850s, there were businesses there run by Jewish families named Solomon, Moses and Shannon. The last hotel there, 'the Squatters' Arms' was last run by John Cullen, after which it became a private residence. The settlement became known as Bunyan in 1858.

Lying close to Cooma, Bunyan was eclipsed by the growing town, and it is now a very small settlement consisting of a few old buildings and some ruins. The area is predominantly rural.

Bunyan had a school from 1895 to 1901 and from 1910 to 1936.

Bunyan railway station opened with the extension of the Bombala railway line on 31 May 1889 and was closed on 8 February 1976. The Cooma Monaro Railway operated rail motors on the line from Chakola to Cooma from 1998 to 2014, but this operation is currently suspended due to the condition of the track.
