= Numeralla =

- Town
- Interactive map of Numeralla
- Coordinates: 36°10′37.3″S 149°20′41.5″E
- Country: Australia
- State: New South Wales
- Region: Monaro
- LGA: Snowy Monaro Regional Council
- Location: 129 km (80 mi) S of Canberra; 23 km (14 mi) E of Cooma; 400 km (250 mi) SSW of Sydney

Government
  - State electorate: Monaro
  - Federal division: Eden-Monaro
- Elevation: 739 m (2,425 ft)

Population
  - Total: 254 (SAL 2021)
- Postcode: 2630
- County: Beresford
- Parish: Numeralla
Localities around Numeralla
Chakola	Peak View	Badja
Bunyan	Numeralla	Countegany
Cooma	Kybeyan	Tuross

Numeralla (/nuːmərælə/ NOO-mə-RAL-ə), is a village in Snowy Monaro Region of New South Wales, Australia. The name is also applied to the surrounding area, for postal and statistical purposes. In 2016, the population of the village and its surrounding area was 258. The village was known as Umaralla until 1972.

== Location ==
It is 400 km from Sydney and 23km east of Cooma, the nearest regional town. It is near the confluence of Numeralla River (until 1972 known as the Umaralla River) and Big Badja River. It lies on the road from Cooma to Braidwood.

== History ==
=== Aboriginal and early settler history ===
The area later known as Numeralla lies within the traditional lands of Ngarigo people.

Colonial settlers came into the district in the 1840s. By 1850, the area was part of a large squatter's run called 'Numarella'. Other settlers came as gold miners in the 1850s and 1860s.

It was reported in 1892 that there were just two of the 'Monaro tribe' (Ngarigo) remaining in the Monaro region. It is now believed some Ngarigo people survived colonisation by leaving the district, some merging with clans around Bega and Bermagui.

=== Gold mining ===
Alluvial gold was found on the Numeralla River in 1858 and on the Big Badja river in 1861. In 1866, diggings extended for three miles along the Numeralla River. By 1868, only a few miners remained. Alluvial mining returned to the area between 1892 and 1897, using hydraulic mining.

=== Village ===
The site for a village was gazetted on 16 July 1863. It was proclaimed a village for a second time, in 1885, as a consequence of the Crown Lands Act 1884. Originally named Umaralla, it was renamed Numeralla in 1972.

Numeralla has had a post office since 1863. The village's public school, which opened in 1877, only closed at the end of 2015.

After mining, the rich river flats were used for some years to grow potatoes for the Monaro and Canberra markets.

== Present day ==
Numeralla has a public hall (Numeralla Digger's Memorial Hall, also known as Numeralla Hall), a Catholic church (All Saint's), an Anglican church (St John's) and a cemetery to the north of the village.

=== Folk festival ===
The Numeralla Folk Festival usually takes place on the weekend closest to Australia Day each year. It is a free event. The festival was cancelled between 2020–22 due to the Black Summer bushfires and the COVID-19 pandemic in New South Wales. It resumed as an annual event in 2023.

== External links section ==
- Numeralla and District Activities Inc. - The official website of Numeralla NSW Australia
