= Billilingra =

- Town
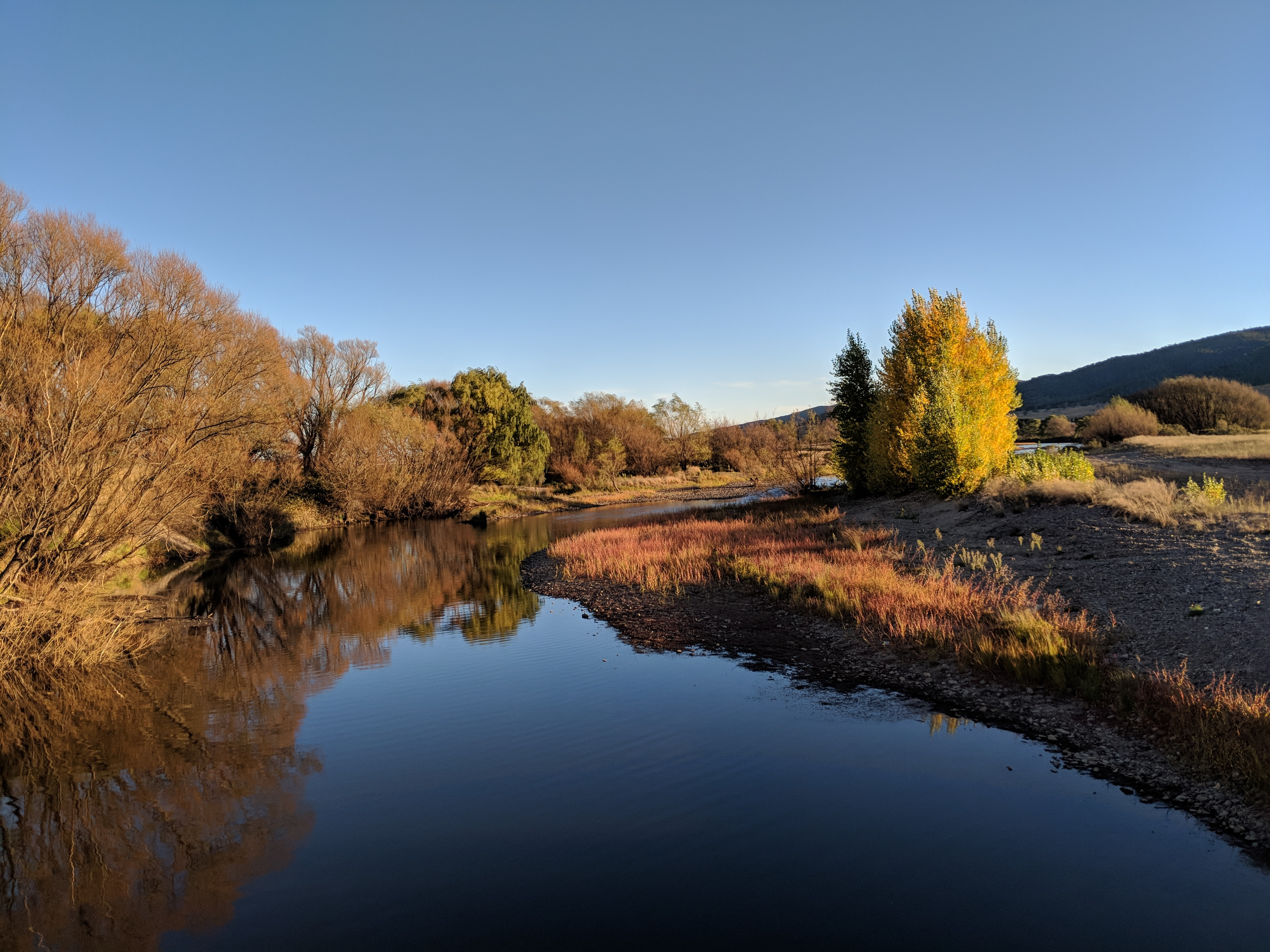
- Murrumbidgee River at Billilingra

- Coordinates: 36°00′57″S 149°07′32″E
- Country: Australia
- State: New South Wales
- Region: Monaro
- LGA: Snowy Monaro Regional Council
- Location: 91 km (57 mi) S of Canberra; 26 km (16 mi) N of Cooma; 373 km (232 mi) SW of Sydney

Government
  - State electorate: Monaro
  - Federal division: Eden-Monaro
- Elevation: 722 m (2,369 ft)

Population
  - Total: 7 (2021 census)
- Postcode: 2630
- County: Beresford
- Parish: York
Localities around Billilingra
Shannons Flat	Bredbo	Bredbo
Shannons Flat	Billilingra	Bredbo
Murrumbucca	Chakola	Chakola

Billilingra is a locality in the Snowy Monaro Region, New South Wales, Australia. It lies on both sides of the Murrumbidgee River and on both sides of the Monaro Highway about 91 km south of Canberra and about 26 km north of Cooma. At the 2021 census, it had a population of 7.

Billilingra railway station opened on 18 October 1894, after the extension of the Bombala railway line through the site on 31 May 1889, and closed in May 1941.
