= Ando, New South Wales =

Ando
- Town
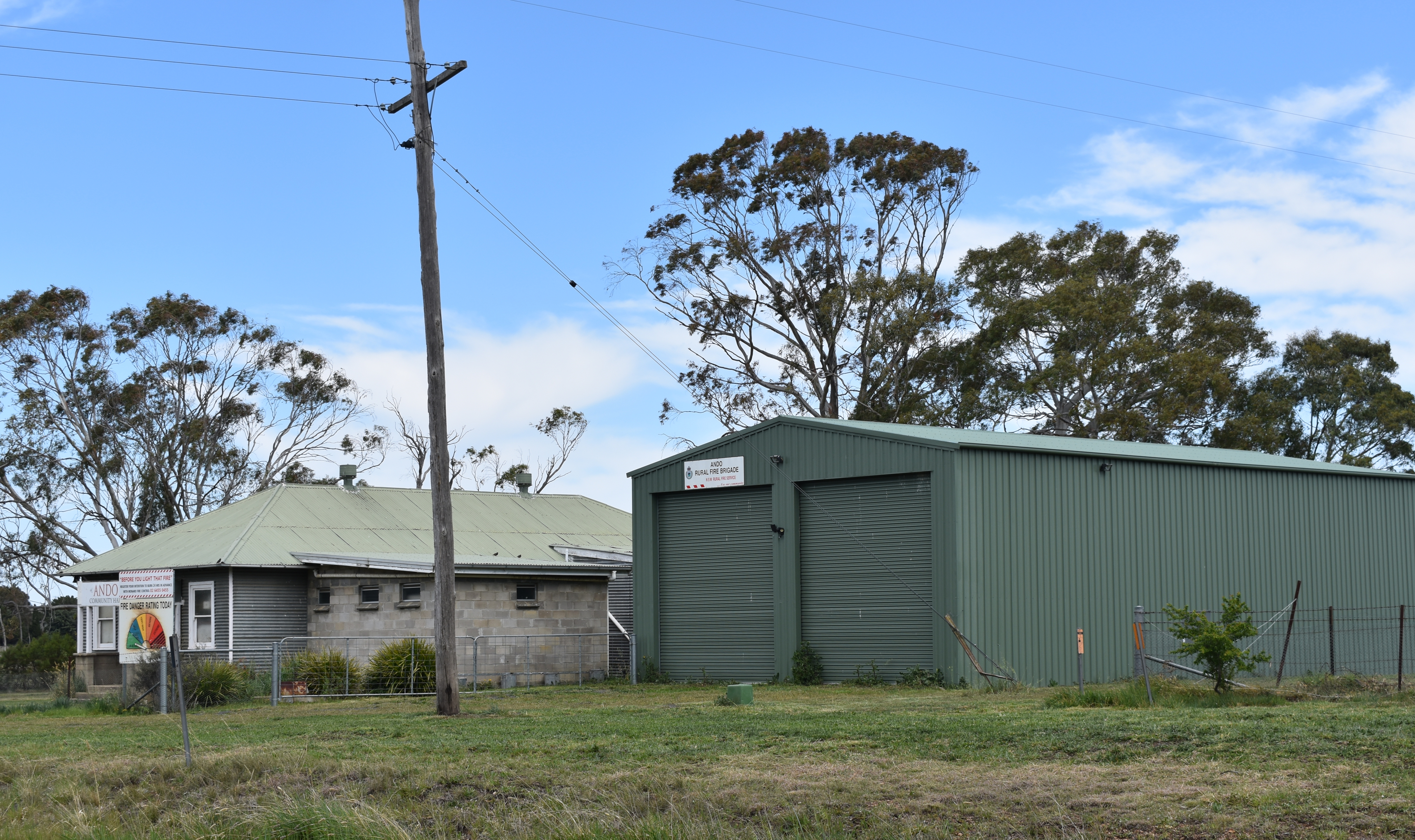
- Community Hall and RFS shed, 2020

- Coordinates: 36°44′18″S 149°15′40″E
- Country: Australia
- State: New South Wales
- LGA: Snowy Monaro Regional Council
- Location: 460 km (290 mi) SSW of Sydney; 22 km (14 mi) N of Bombala
- Established: 1862

Government
  - State electorate: Monaro
  - Federal division: Eden-Monaro

Population
  - Total: 49 (2021 census)
- Postcode: 2631

Ando is a rural hamlet with a very small population in the Snowy Monaro Regional Council in southern New South Wales, Australia. The village is at the junction of the Monaro Highway and Snowy River Way, about 20 km (12 mi) north of Bombala. The surrounding area is predominantly agricultural land holdings.

Ando was first settled around 1862 by Ghikas Boulgaris (locally known as Jigger Bulgary), a Greek convict who had been transported to New South Wales after being captured attempting to rob a British merchant ship in the Mediterranean Sea. Boulgaris, the first Greek migrant in Australia, took up land on the Bibbenluke estate and named it Ando.

A school opened in the village in 1913, but closed in 2011 when enrollments had dropped to just 6 students. The village also maintains a rural fire service and a community hall. A railway station at Jincumbilly, a few kilometers west served Ando and the surrounding pastoral areas between 1921 and 1975. There was a post office there from 1915 until 1981.
