= Chakola =

- Town
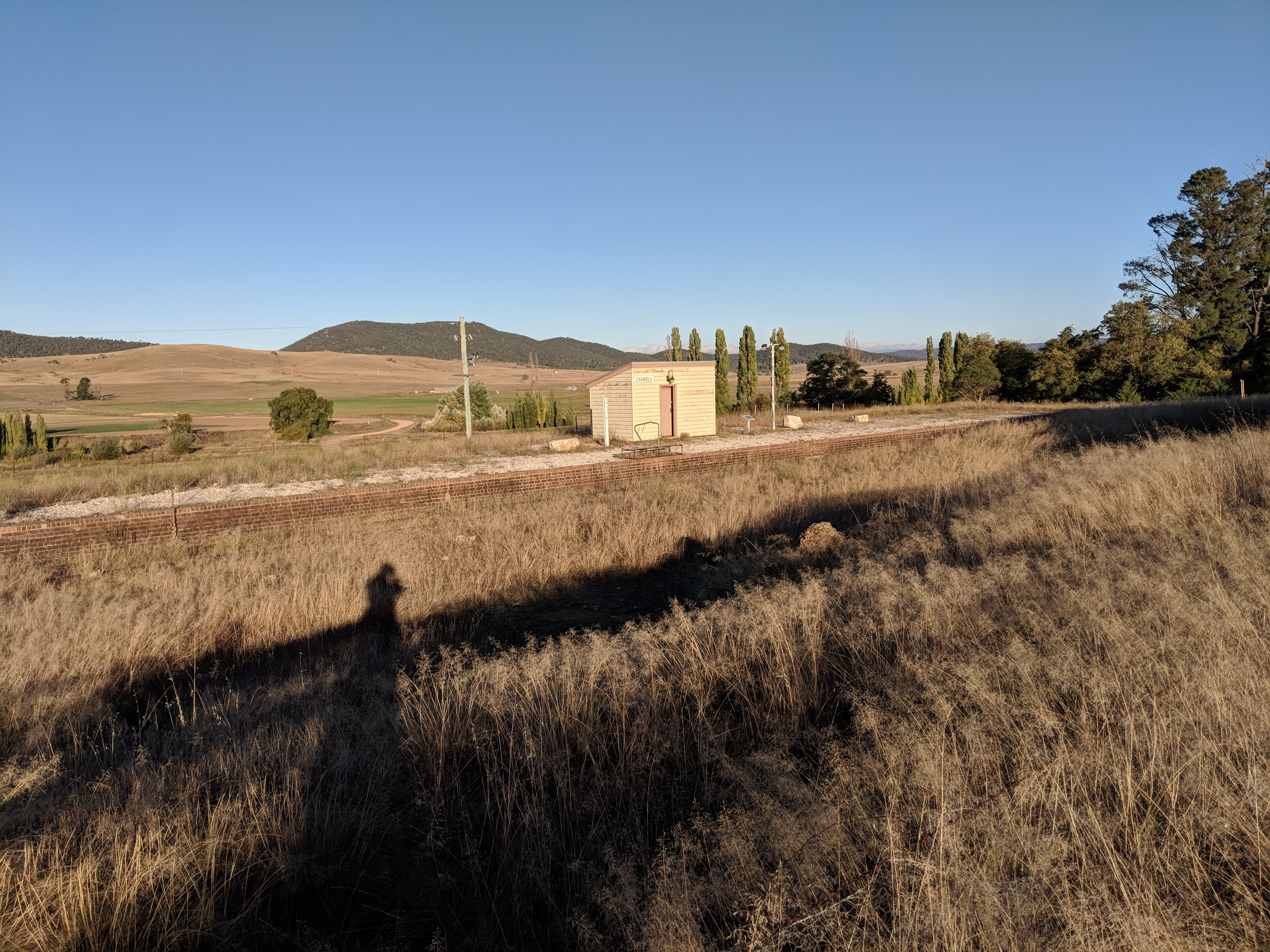
- Chakola station

- Coordinates: 36°05′57″S 149°10′02″E
- Country: Australia
- State: New South Wales
- Region: Monaro
- LGA: Snowy Monaro Regional Council
- Location: 100 km (62 mi) S of Canberra; 25 km (16 mi) N of Cooma; 381 km (237 mi) SW of Sydney

Government
  - State electorate: Monaro
  - Federal division: Eden-Monaro
- Elevation: 713 m (2,339 ft)

Population
  - Total: 88 (SAL 2021)
- Postcode: 2630
- County: Beresford
- Parish: Woolumla
Localities around Chakola
Billilingra	Billilingra	Peak View
Murrumbucca	Chakola	Rose Valley
Murrumbucca	Bunyan	Bunyan

Chakola is a locality in the Snowy Monaro Region, New South Wales, Australia. It lies on both sides of the Murrumbidgee River and both sides of the Numeralla River. It also lies on both sides of the Monaro Highway about 100 km south of Canberra and about 25 km north of Cooma. At the 2016 census, it had a population of 47.

Chakola railway station opened with the extension of the Bombala railway line on 31 May 1889 and was originally called Umeralla. It was renamed Chakola on 1 April 1921 and closed on 8 February 1976. The Cooma Monaro Railway operated rail motors on the line to Cooma from 1998 to 2014, but this operation is currently suspended due to the condition of the track.
