= Cooma railway station =

Former railway station in New South Wales, Australia

Cooma
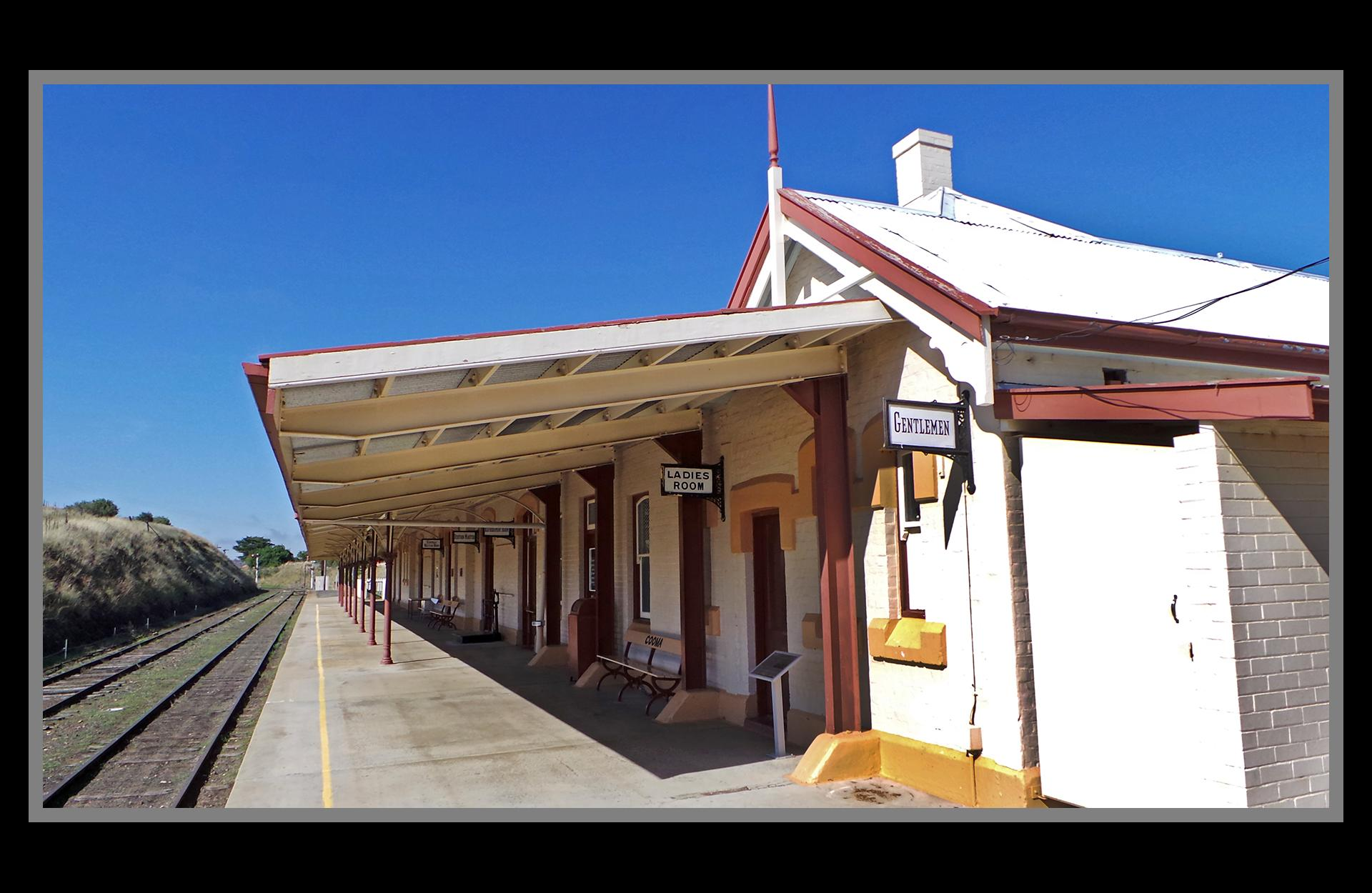
- Cooma railway station, 2013

General information
- Location: Bradley Street, Cooma, Snowy Monaro Regional Council, New South Wales, Australia
- Coordinates: 36°14′10″S 149°08′08″E
- System: Heritage railway station
- Owner: Transport Asset Manager of New South Wales
- Line: Bombala railway line
- Platforms: 2
- Tracks: 1
- Train operators: Cooma Monaro Railway (tourist)

Construction
- Structure type: Ground
- Architect: John Whitton (attributed)

Other information
- Status: Used by heritage railway; NSW TrainLink coach stop

History
- Opened: 31 May 1889
- Closed: c. 1989
- Rebuilt: c. 1950s
- Location in New South Wales

New South Wales Heritage Register
- Official name: Cooma Railway Station and yard group; Cooma Railway Engine Shed
- Type: State heritage (complex / group)
- Designated: 2 April 1999
- Reference no.: 1116
- Type: Railway Platform/Station
- Category: Transport – Rail
- Builders: Walker & Swan
Route map
Location

The Cooma railway station is a heritage-listed railway station on the Bombala railway line at Bradley Street, Cooma, New South Wales, Australia. The original design of the station was attributed to John Whitton. The station complex was built from 1889 to 1950. The Cooma Monaro Railway is based at the station and runs a heritage railway museum in the restored station building, with plans to restore heritage passenger train operations. The station was added to the New South Wales State Heritage Register on 2 April 1999.

== History ==
The third and final section of the Goulburn to Cooma Railway (later the Bombala line) opened to traffic on Thursday 30 May 1889. The Railway Commissioners arranged a special low-cost excursion mail train from Sydney, which departed 9pm on the 29th, arriving in Cooma at 11.45am the next day. The construction contract for the 40 mile line from Michelago to Cooma was awarded to Walker & Swan on 18 August 1885.

The opening ceremony for the completion of the line was held at Cooma station on Friday, 31 May 1889. A special train, which had departed Redfern at midnight the previous Wednesday, carried a number of dignitaries, including Bruce Smith, Minister for Works, Daniel O'Connor, Postmaster-General and about twenty members of parliament to Cooma for a major celebration.

A substantial complex had been built to provide a large town and developing district the benefits which rail could bring to the area. The complex then comprised a five-room station building with separate toilet block and lamp room, located at each, a platform, a station master's residence, locomotive shed with turntable, coal stage, ash pits, water columns and water tank, a goods yard with shed, platform, office and gantry crane, a wool loading bank and stockyards, a water supply, a rest house and an interlocking machine.

Improvements were made every few years to the railway yard. In 1912 a signal box was erected on the Cooma platform, replacing the original interlocking system, and the line was extended to Nimmitabel.

Cooma station was busy during the war years as the local departure point for troops. A number of modifications and improvements were carried out in the early 20th century. A major fire destroyed the locomotive shed in 1923 and it was rebuilt in 1925. A refreshment room opened in the station building in 1922 and six years later a larger refreshment room was created incorporating the southern storage area. In 1940 a new rest house or barracks was constructed to house 12 men and the original rest house demolished in 1944. The station was busy again during World War II when army recruits from all over the district gathered to travel to the army base at Goulburn.

The era of the Snowy Mountains Scheme, from the 1950s to 1970s, prompted further changes such as additional facilities and upgrading from steam to diesel locomotives. The Scheme was the largest engineering project ever undertaken in Australia, and provided a major source of employment for post-war migrants. Overall 100,000 people worked on the Scheme between 1949 and 1974, two-thirds of them being migrants from more than 30 countries. The Goulburn to Cooma railway line became the lifeline for the Scheme, with passenger trains transporting the workers and their families to and from Cooma.

The Railway Institute Building constructed in 1958 is indicative of the expansion of Cooma during this period: "The Railway Institute was the railway's focal point for the majority of employee training, apprenticeships and scholarships for the large number of trade and non-trade personnel required to maintain and run the continually expanding railway system. The Institute created branches in major country towns and... they were not only the local focal point for training and education, but became the meeting place for the community to participate in various sporting and social activities in the town with many dances and dinners being held regularly in their halls".

A rapid decline of activity at the station, due partly to the completion of the Scheme, resulted in a decrease in freight and passengers, and NSW Railways could not justify repairs required to the track and the old timber trestle bridge over the Numeralla River. The last passenger train left Cooma in November 1988 and the last freight train in 1989. Consequently, the station closed and has now become the most intact railway precinct in NSW demonstrating a century of railway development. The station building has been restored and is the base for the Cooma Monaro Railway.

The stationmaster's residence and gatekeeper's cottage are extant but are privately owned.

== Description ==
The station complex comprises a type 4, brick standard roadside station (1889) and platform, a weatherboard skillion roof (1912), an out-of-shed (c. 1940, and a timber and corrugated iron goods shed. The station yard includes loading banks, weighbridge, weighbridge office and fettlers shed.

The locomotive precinct includes the engine shed (1889), engine store, turntable (1902), coal stage (timber slabs), water column (cast iron with hose attachment), water tank (2000), original water tank site, and ash pits (4 pits, bricks and concrete). The heritage listing also includes the District Locomotive Engineer's (DLE's) Office (1950), the Barracks & Laundry (c. 1940) and the Railway Institute Hall & Tennis Courts (c. 1958), and the diesel depot, consisting of two small timber sheds with corrugated iron roofs and diesel pipework.

The signals and signal gantries (c. 1950s), fuel unloading points including pipework and stands, signs (entrance sign, nameboards, platform signs, warning signs, heritage signs), slab (retaining and crossover), platform benches (3 timber and cast iron railway benches) and the station landscape are also heritage-listed.

Station building (1889)

The station building is a standard roadside design, symmetrically planned with awning supported on cast iron posts and decorative brackets. The brick building comprises seven main rooms, toilet skillion, entrance vestibule with verandahs and platform with awning. The roof is gabled and clad with painted corrugated iron and features a central transverse gable. The gables display fretwork and finials and rendered walls have masonry detailing. The building, erected in 1888, has undergone a series of modifications but still displays its Railway Gothic architectural style with many original elements and decorative features in situ. Major modifications were undertaken during the 1920s and the 1960s, the latter owing to increased activity during construction of the Snowy Scheme. The original side pavilions have been replaced by later extensions. At one end new toilets were provided on a larger scale than previously along with additional rooms for luggage and waiting.

The building is located on a brick and concrete platform.

Signal box (1912)

The signal box was erected on the platform in 1912 and is a small scalloped weatherboard building with a corrugated iron pitched gable roof. An extension was built in 1955 on the western side to house relays and batteries for track circuits and the electric staff.

Out-of-shed (c. 1940)

The small building, which is presently used as a store, is known as the out-of-shed. It was relocated to the platform prior to 1949 and is thought to have been originally a waiting room at a small unattended station. The section at the rear was constructed to house batteries and electrical equipment at the time the signals were electrified. The building has a brick footing, timber skirting, scalloped weatherboard walls, and timber sliding door.

Goods shed and yard (1889)

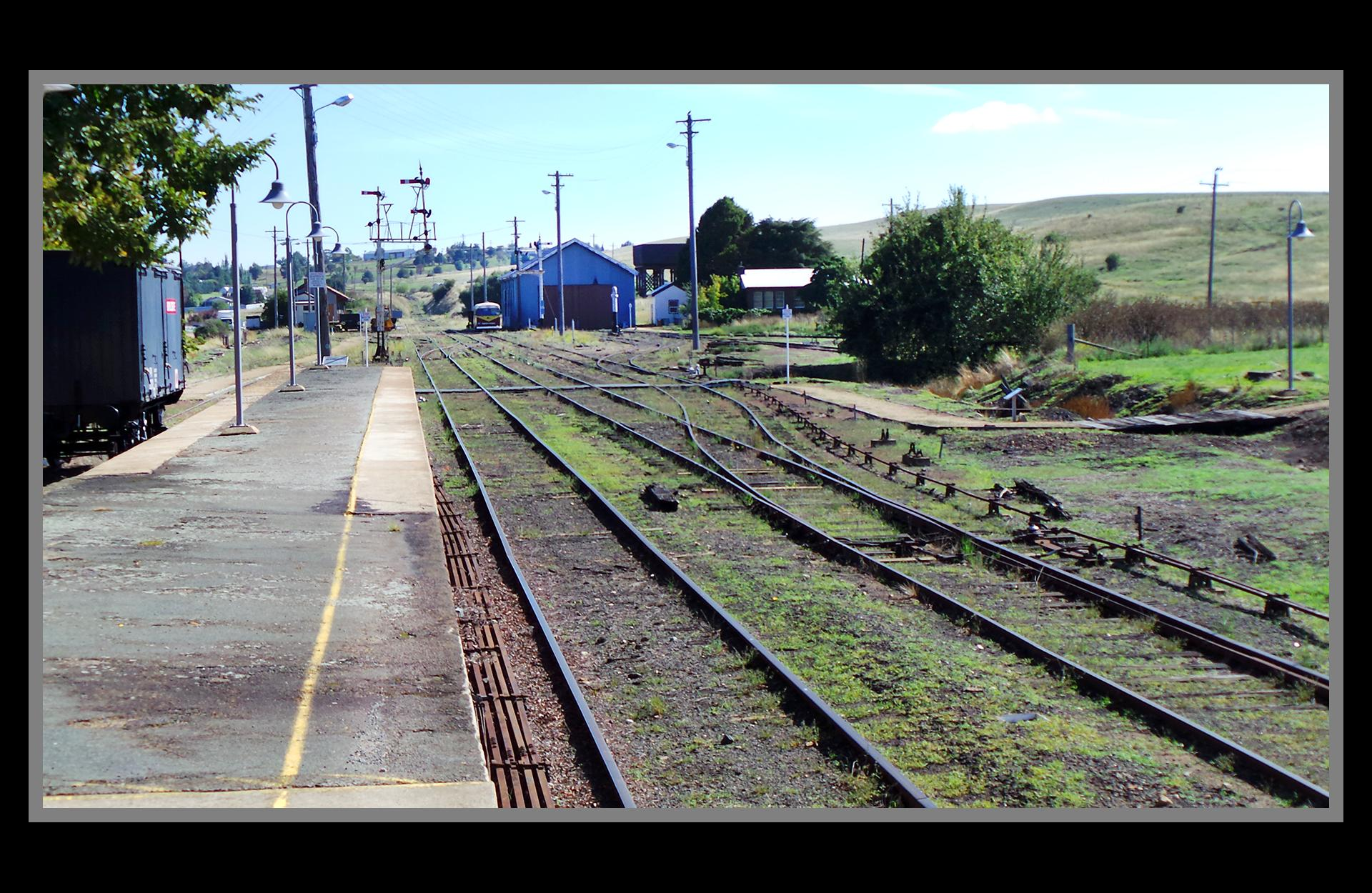
Cooma railway yards, 2013

The goods shed is made up of four separate sections constructed over 100 years. The earliest part is the central section, dating to 1889. It has brick pier footings, vertical tongue and groove dado and corrugated iron walls, a corrugated iron roof, and a platform and loading stage with timber sleepers running north south. Newer sections of the shed include a 3-room and toilet addition with brick piers, weatherboard walls, and corrugated iron roof cladding, as well as Colorbond clad extension with a platform and loading stage. A suspended concrete platform loading dock has also been added, with Colorbond cladding and a corrugated iron roof. Other important components of the goods yard are the metal weighbridge, weatherboard weighbridge office, wool and cattle loading ramps dating to 1889, consisting of concrete banks with railway line edges and gravel floors, and a corrugated iron fettlers' shed.

Locomotive precinct (1889)

The main element of the locomotive precinct is the straight type engine shed but also included is the store, turntable, coal stage, water column, water tank, ash pits and other infrastructure necessary to service and maintain rolling stock. The engine shed has 1889 English bond brickwork footings. The walls are made of vertical corrugated galvanised iron, with some panels on the east facade made of clear corrugated perspex. The roof is clad in corrugated iron. The doors and windows date to 1997 and 1998 respectively.

The engine store has concrete footings, scalloped weatherboard walls, timber doors and window frames, and a corrugated iron roof.

The turntable is 60 ft in length with timber and steel platform set on a concrete pit directly connected to the engine shed and yard.

District Locomotive Engineer's (DLE's) Office (1950)

The DLE's office is a single storey face brick building, constructed in an L shape, with a corrugated galvanised iron gable roof, and timber doors, window frames, and fascias. It was built in 1950 to provide an office for the DLE and amenities for those working in the engine shed, such as a meal room, locker room, washrooms and so on. The building has now been converted to a residence with little alteration to the floor plan.

Barracks (1941)

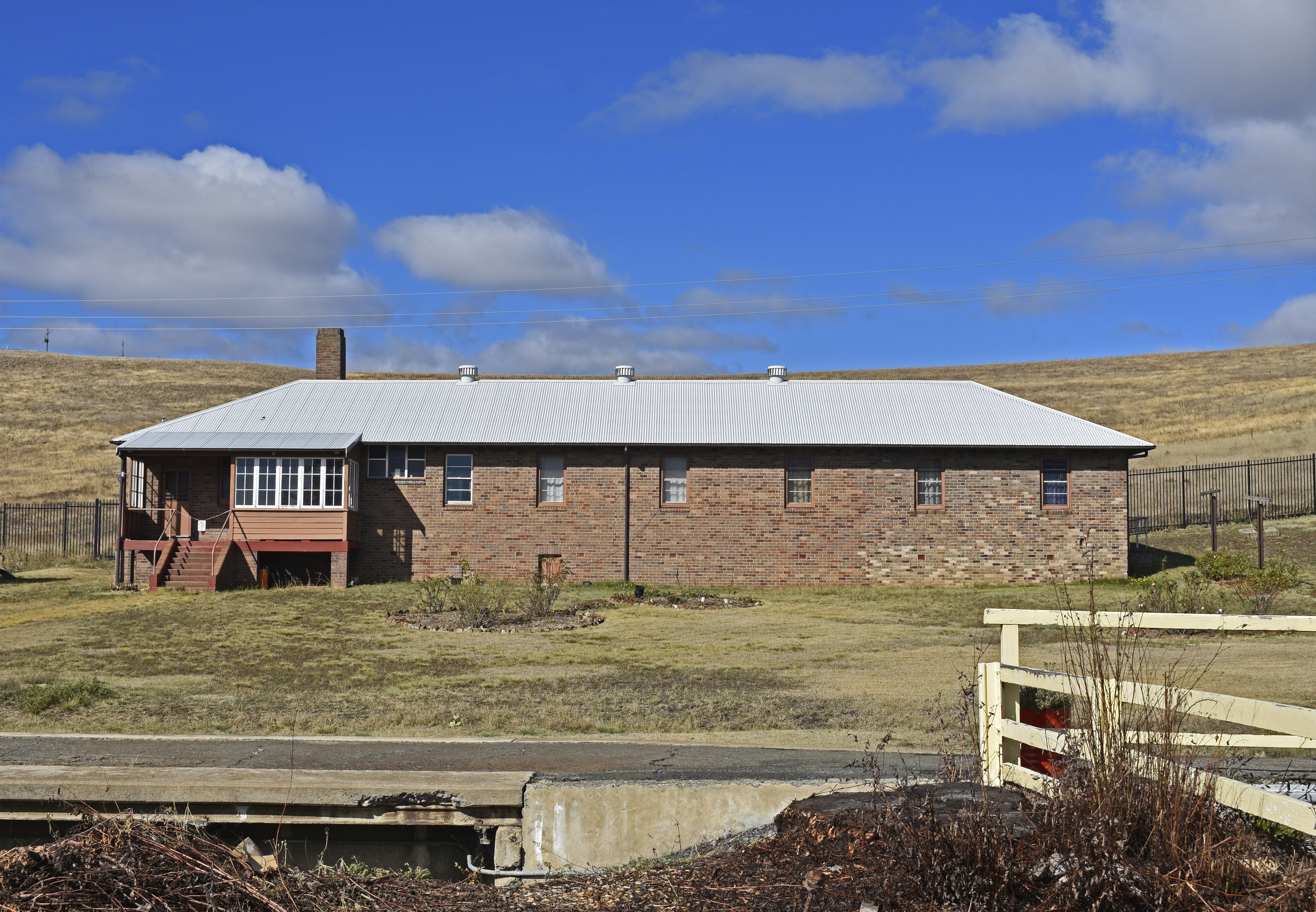
The barracks

The building initially consisted of six bedrooms to sleep 12 men, with bathroom facilities, a kitchen and dining room. There is also a separate laundry. Some years later, between 1952 and 1955, an extension of four more bedrooms was attached. The interior of the building is relatively intact however four of the original bedrooms have been combined to form a meeting room. The barracks building has brick footings and walls, corrugated asbestos roof cladding, with timber post verandahs to the east and west, and a brick chimney.

Railway Institute and tennis courts (1958)

The railway institute hall is a small, single storey building of two rooms, comprising a hall and annex, erected c. 1958. The tennis court was built around the same time. The institute hall has exposed brick piers, asbestos cement sheet cladding, and a corrugated iron roof. The tennis courts consist of two gravel courts with wire netting fence, a slab retaining wall, and timber benches.

Landscape

Photos from the 1920s show that there were no exotic plantings in the old railway yard. Since then gardening at railway stations has become a tradition with such features as rose species in forecourts, approaches lined with trees and plants in tubs on platforms. This trend is demonstrated at Cooma. The majority of the yard is covered with native grasses, which are kept slashed and quite a few areas are infested with noxious weeds. Rubbish and extraneous items have built up around the engine shed, goods shed in the ash pits and the DLE's office garden.

=== Condition ===
The station was reported to generally be in good condition as at 11 November 2009.

The station group including the station buildings, platforms and related structures have a high level of integrity. The Cooma Railway Station precinct retains its ability to demonstrate 100 years of rail which sets it apart from other railway sites in NSW. All necessary elements for operating the railway are in place and of the past 61 major fixed items which were previously at the railway yard, 55 are still found.

== Heritage listing ==
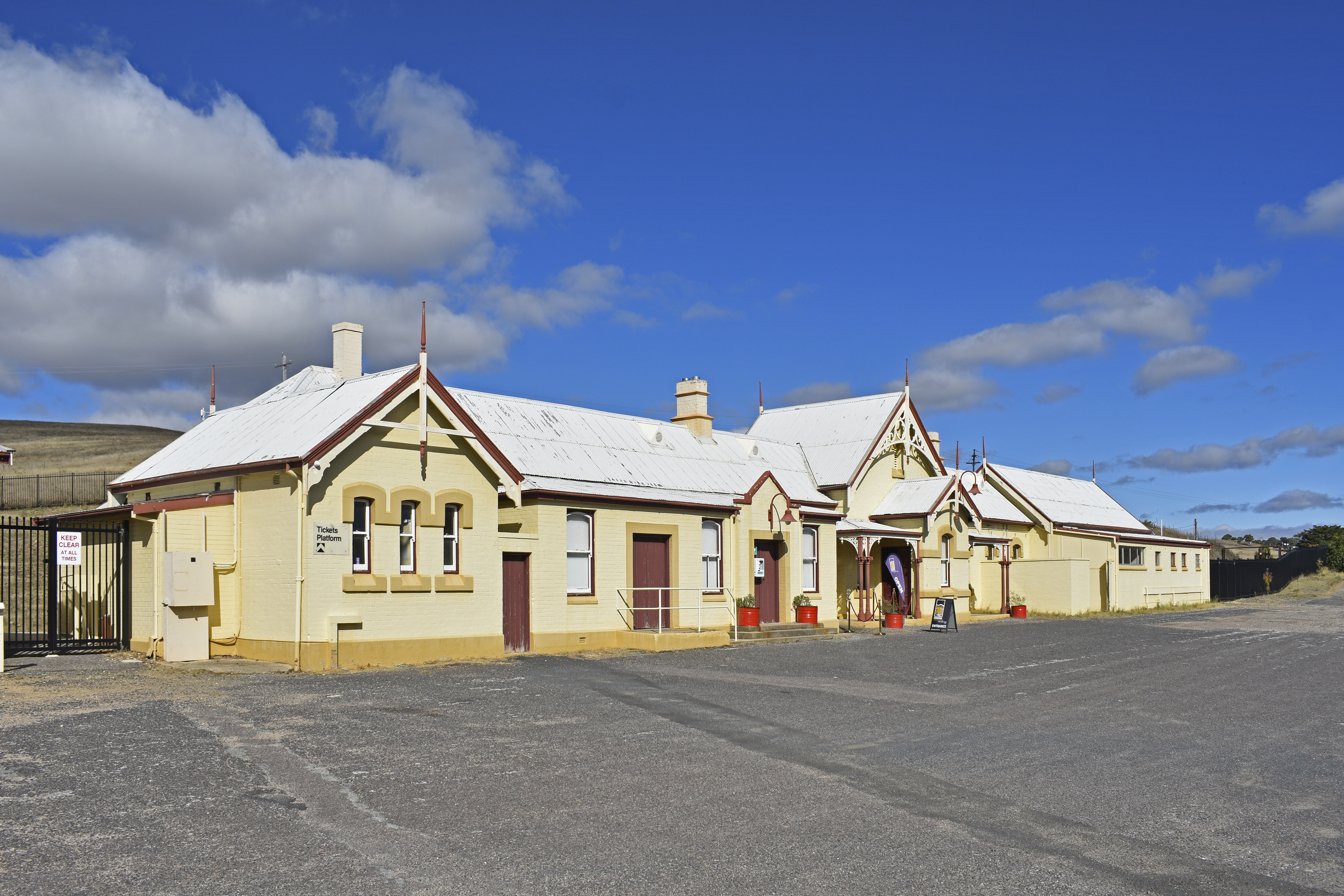
Railway station building

Cooma Railway Station Group is of state significance for its role in the development of Cooma, the Monaro and the Snowy Scheme and for its provision of services for freight and passengers for over a century. The increasing and decreasing importance of rail as a mode of transport can be interpreted through the evolution of the site. It was built under the support of Engineer-in-Chief John Whitton whose name is synonymous with the expansion of railways throughout New South Wales. The station building, which is one of a group of similar buildings constructed for the Southern Railway, displays his design skills and the inclusion of some refined architectural elements results in this building being more impressive than others of its size. The siting of the precinct on a hill on the outskirts of Cooma results in it being one of the town's landmarks. The arrival of the railway in Cooma changed the lives of the district's inhabitants and the railway was the venue for many important social events and occasions of arrivals and departures particularly for the two world wars. Those working on the Snowy Scheme depended on the railway and during construction the railways were one of the largest employers in the region.

Cooma's group of railway buildings and infrastructure illustrate designs and materials from a number of eras and make an important contribution to understanding railway practices and life, and the railway's philosophy of relocation and reuse. There are a number of rare items at the site but the two most significant are the signalling equipment, the most complete of its kind in Australia, and the straight type engine shed, being only one of four extant and considered to be the most intact example.

Cooma railway station was listed on the New South Wales State Heritage Register on 2 April 1999 having satisfied the following criteria.

The place is important in demonstrating the course, or pattern, of cultural or natural history in New South Wales.

Extension of the railway line from Goulburn to Cooma, and finally to Bombala, had a major effect on the development of the Monaro. It enabled Cooma to become the commercial centre of the region and the district's agricultural economy to flourish. The capacity of the station was an important factor in selection of the town as the headquarters for the Snowy Mountains Hydro-electric Authority (SMHEA). Owing to its operation over 100 years and expansion of facilities to suit the needs of the community the precinct demonstrates growth phases over a century. There are many extant items which date from 1889, the year of opening, as well as representative examples from all eras of its 100 years operation.

The place has a strong or special association with a person, or group of persons, of importance of cultural or natural history of New South Wales's history.

Cooma railway was built during the time that John Whitton was Engineer-in-Chief of the NSW Railways 1856 to 1890. It was through Whitton's influence and persistence that nearly 3,500 km of track were laid throughout the state and cheap alternatives, such as narrow gauge rail tracks, did not eventuate. The station building is a good representative example of Whitton's architectural skills. The site has aesthetic significance as a railway precinct that retains several original items that demonstrate railway design in the 1880s. The 1887 station building is a fine example of a Victorian first class roadside station building with fabric and fine detailing typical of the period

The place is important in demonstrating aesthetic characteristics and/or a high degree of creative or technical achievement in New South Wales.

John Whitton was trained as an architect as well as an engineer, and the station buildings erected during his tenure as Engineer-in-Chief, including Cooma, exhibit Victorian architectural detailing that illustrates his design skills. The station building at Cooma demonstrates architectural features characteristic of Victorian railway buildings, as well as the evolution of requirements over ten decades. Along with the other buildings, facilities and equipment, the complex presents an example of a railway station landscape. The siting of the precinct makes it a landmark in the town.

The place has strong or special association with a particular community or cultural group in New South Wales for social, cultural or spiritual reasons.

For most of the 100 years that trains operated between Queanbeyan and Cooma agricultural producers depended on the railway to get their produce to market, people were able to travel easily, goods arriving in Cooma were cheaper and more diverse and it enabled the town and district to develop. The railway was essential for Cooma to become the SMHEA headquarters which completely changed the social fabric of the town. Memorable arrivals and departures at the station have been significant events in local people's lives. The railway was a major employer in Cooma and many people spent all their working lives there. The Institute Building is significant as the social hub of the Cooma railway precinct during its expansion in the 1950s.

The place has potential to yield information that will contribute to an understanding of the cultural or natural history of New South Wales.

Cooma railway station is considered to be the most complete rail precinct in NSW demonstrating 100 years of rail development from steam engines to diesel locomotives and with possibly the most complete pre 1960 type railway signalling equipment in Australia. Many items and areas demonstrate the railway's philosophies of relocation and reuse, railway customs and practices and the railway lifestyle. The development and fluctuations of a rural railway station are illustrated at Cooma.

The place possesses uncommon, rare or endangered aspects of the cultural or natural history of New South Wales.

The Cooma railway precinct is considered to be the only site in NSW which so completely illustrates the development of rail from steam to diesel. At the station 90% of the items which were historically present are in place. The completeness and functionality of the signalling equipment, which is the only arrangement of its type in Australia, and the straight type locomotive shed, one of only four extant in NSW, are particularly rare features.

The place is important in demonstrating the principal characteristics of a class of cultural or natural places/environments in New South Wales.

The precinct is a good representation of a rural railway station which developed over a 100-year period. Items at the site represent railway customs, functions, architectural designs, work practices and requirements for passengers and freight as well as the railway's attitude to its employees. The station building is a good example of one of John Whitton's larger station buildings with many original features intact. The barracks, although altered, is representative of standard railway accommodation built for crew workers during the mid 20th Century.

== See also ==
- Works of John Whitton
- List of disused railway stations in regional New South Wales
