= Anglers Reach, New South Wales =

Anglers Reach
- Town
- Coordinates: 36°01′S 148°40′E
- Country: Australia
- State: New South Wales
- LGA: Snowy Monaro Regional Council

Government
  - State electorate: Monaro
  - Federal division: Eden-Monaro
- Elevation: 1,180 m (3,870 ft)

Population
  - Total: 78 (2021 census)
- Postcode: 2629
- Annual rainfall: 909.9 mm (35.82 in)

Anglers Reach is a village in New South Wales, Australia, located in the Snowy Monaro Regional Council. It is situated on the shores of Lake Eucumbene near Adaminaby. At the 2021 census, it has a resident population of about 78, but is popular as a holiday destination for trout fishing and as a base for visitors to the skifields at Selwyn Snowfields.

== Climate ==
Rainfall data are taken from Adaminaby (Yaouk), showing a slight tendency to winter and spring rainfall, in contrast to the bulk of the Monaro region. Snow occurs regularly from June to September and can even occur in December.

Climate data for Adaminaby (Yaouk, 1969–2022); 1,140 m AMSL; 35.79° S, 148.81° E
Month	Jan	Feb	Mar	Apr	May	Jun	Jul	Aug	Sep	Oct	Nov	Dec	Year
Average precipitation mm (inches)	79.0 (3.11)	73.8 (2.91)	59.1 (2.33)	50.2 (1.98)	57.8 (2.28)	81.8 (3.22)	71.1 (2.80)	90.8 (3.57)	87.4 (3.44)	73.7 (2.90)	86.3 (3.40)	81.7 (3.22)	909.9 (35.82)
Source: Australian Bureau of Meteorology; Adaminaby (Yaouk)
