= CPH railmotor =

Railcars used in New South Wales

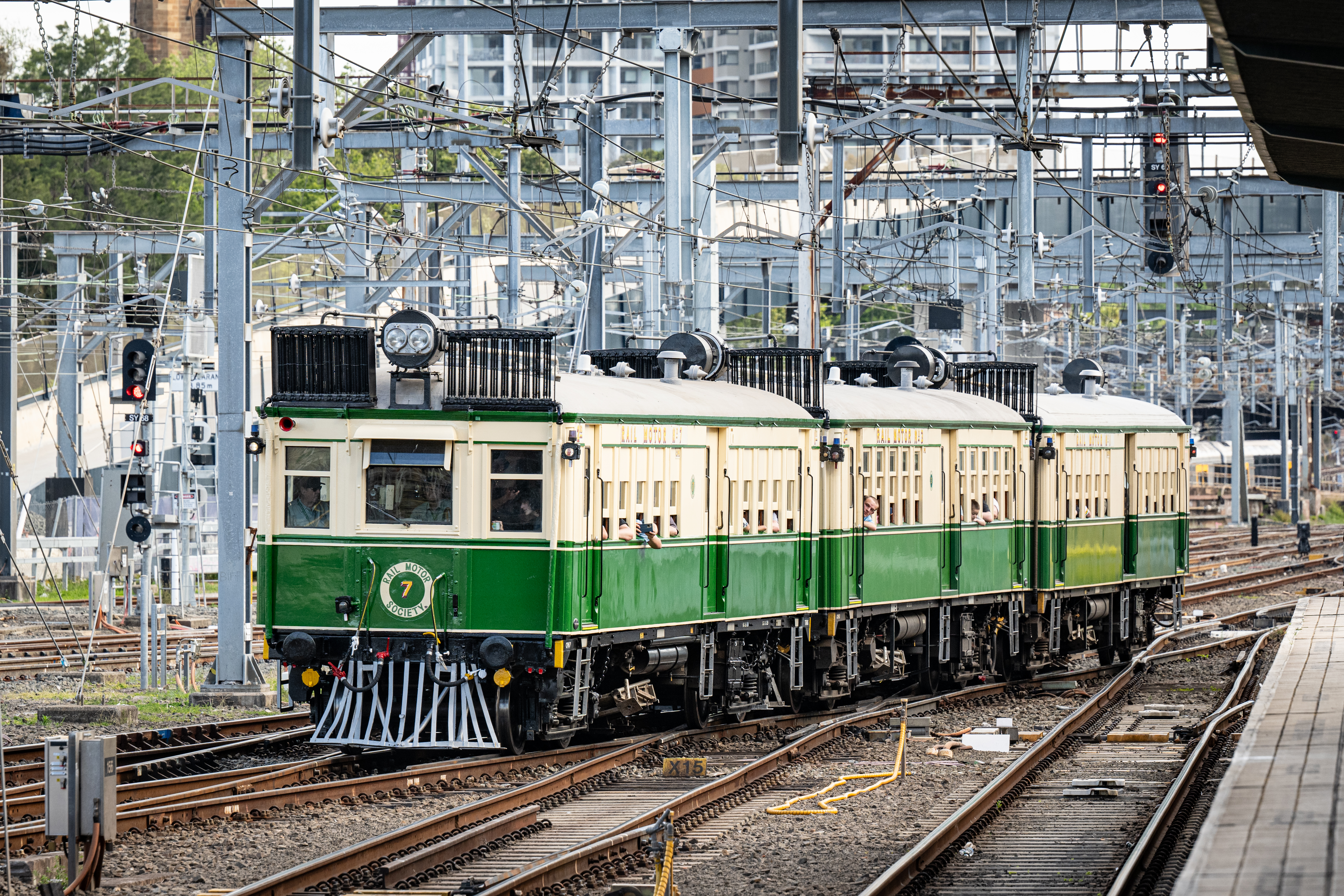
- CPH 7 at Central

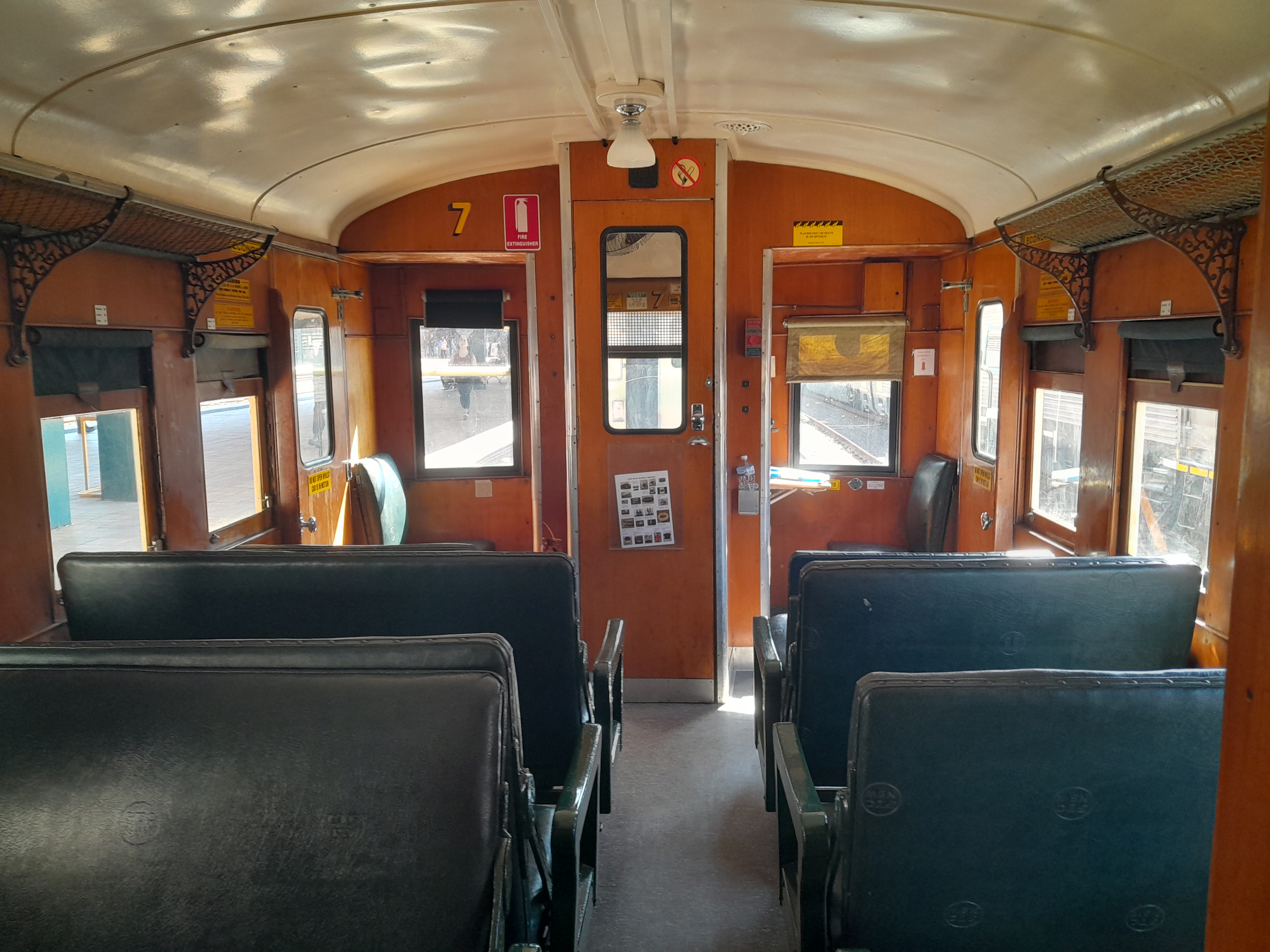
- Interior
- In service: 1923–1985
- Manufacturer: New South Wales Government Railways
- Replaced: Steam locomotives and carriages
- Constructed: 1923–1927
- Entered service: 17 December 1923
- Scrapped: 1985
- Number built: 37 motors 5 trailers
- Number preserved: 23 motors 5 trailers
- Number scrapped: 14 motors 0 trailers
- Formation: Single unit
- Fleet numbers: CPH 1–37 (motors); CTC 51–55 (trailers)
- Capacity: 45
- Operators: New South Wales Government Railways; Department of Railways; Public Transport Commission; State Rail Authority

Specifications
- Car body construction: Timber
- Car length: 12.8 m (42 ft 0 in)
- Traction system: Petrol; Diesel
- Prime movers: 75 hp (56 kW) Thornycroft Z6; 95 hp (71 kW) Leyland; 150 hp (110 kW) Leyland; Detroit Diesel 71 Series
- Transmission: Mechanical; Lysholm-Smith hydraulic Twin Disc hydraulic
- Track gauge: 1,435 mm (4 ft 8 1/2 in) standard gauge

The CPH (or 42 foot) rail motors were introduced by the New South Wales Government Railways in 1923 to provide feeder service on country branch lines.

== Introduction ==
Often referred to as "Tin Hares", having evolved at the same time as the mechanical lures used in greyhound racing in Australia, the first vehicle was placed in service on 17 December 1923 and based at Culcairn, in southern New South Wales.

== Construction ==
They were lightweight vehicles and considerable care was taken in the original selection of materials used in their construction. One of the most innovative features was the underframe, taking the form of a modified Warren truss (containing additional vertical struts). No bolts or rivets were used in its construction and it was fabricated entirely by electric arc welding. It is believed to be the first application of such technique on a railway vehicle in Australia.

The body was of timber construction, using mainly Queensland yellow wood, pines and cedars. The cars were finished externally with tongue and grooved timber below the window line.

In addition, five similar non-powered trailer cars were constructed between 1926 and 1927. The body for these cars was constructed in a similar manner and dimensions to their powered counterparts, but were mounted on a lighter "C" section steel underframe. Seating arrangements were similar, however, they featured a larger centre Guard's compartment. They were numbered 51 to 55 and carried the coding CTC.

== Seating ==
As built, the normal seating capacity was 45, 21 in 1st class and 24 in 2nd class. A further seven could be accommodated on the flap seats provided in the guard's compartment. An additional feature of these cars were the prized seats either side of the driver (the drivers cab being centrally located in the middle of the carriage, there was one passenger seat located either side of the driver's cab, looking directly ahead).

During their lifetime, seating arrangements were modified to suit the working being undertaken and included the removal of a varying number of seats for increased luggage capacity. From the mid-1970s the so-called "Big Cab" conversions were applied to a number of units. This involved the construction of a wall between the first and second rows of seats to create an isolated driver's cab. The back of the original driver's cab was removed and a loose seat provided. This conversion was applied to one end only and could be fitted to either the No.1 or No.2 End.

== Engines ==
As built, they were fitted with petrol engines, the first four (CPH 3–6) receiving a 6-cylinder 75 hp Thornycroft Z6 and the others a 6-cylinder 95 hp Leyland type with a four-speed mechanical transmission controlled by a gear lever in the cab. Some units were later fitted with a 6-cylinder 150 hp Leyland petrol engine with a Lysholm-Smith hydraulic transmission. Experiments were also made with AEC and Winton engines in some vehicles. A 6-cylinder 120 hp Leyland diesel engine was also trialled in one unit. During World War 2, to conserve fuel, gas producer units were fitted to six vehicles. Five of these six vehicles were destroyed when fire spread to the vehicle. Beginning in 1945, a programme began to replace the petrol engines with 6-cylinder GM Detroit Diesel 71 Series engines and Twin Disc 3-position hydraulic transmissions. It was also at this time that multiple unit controls were fitted. A single driver's cab and multiple unit controls were fitted to the No.2 End of the five trailer cars at this time.

== Operations ==
A total of 37 vehicles were built and they operated many branch line services throughout the state, from Kyogle in the north to the Riverina in the south, as well as extensively through the Central West regions, until their widespread withdrawal in November 1983 and replacement by road coaches. A fleet of 12 CPHs continued to be used extensively in the Wollongong area, working north to Waterfall, west to Moss Vale and south to Port Kembla and Kiama. In Newcastle a CPH provided passenger services on the Belmont line until these ceased in April 1971.

They also operated pre-electrification service on many Sydney suburban services. These include Bankstown to Lidcombe, Clyde to Carlingford, Liverpool to Campbelltown, Westmead to Rogans Hill, Kingsgrove to East Hills, Hornsby to Cowan, Blacktown to Richmond and Sutherland to Waterfall. In November 1984 the last Sydney area motors were withdrawn from Richmond services along with most of those in Wollongong. The final two CPHs, 36 and 37, were withdrawn after the Moss Vale to Wollongong service ceased in September 1985.

== Preservation ==
Following list of preserved Rail Motors:

Preserved Rolling Stock
Number	Owner	Status	Reference
CPH 1	Rail Motor Society	Operational	Rail Motor, CPH 1
CPH 2	Capital Region Heritage Rail	Static, Junee Roundhouse Railway Museum
CPH 3	NSW Rail Museum/THNSW on loan to Rail Motor Society	Operational	Rail Motor, CPH 3
CPH 6	Cooma Monaro Railway	Operational
CPH 7	NSW Rail Museum/THNSW on loan to Rail Motor Society	Operational	Rail Motor, CPH 7
CPH 8	Cooma-Monaro Railway	Under restoration
CPH 11	Glenreagh Mountain Railway	Under restoration
CPH 12	Lachlan Valley Railway	Operational
CPH 13	NSW Rail Museum/THNSW	Under restoration, NSW Rail Museum, Thirlmere
CPH 14	Rail Motor Society	Stored	Rail Motor, CPH 14
CPH 16	Lachlan Valley Railway	Stored Cowra
CPH 18	NSW Rail Museum	Operational	Rail Motor, CPH 18
CPH 19	Rail Motor Society	Stored	Rail Motor, CPH 19
CPH 22	Cooma-Monaro Railway	Operational
CPH 24	Lachlan Valley Railway	Operational
CPH 25	Lachlan Valley Railway	Operational
CPH 27	Capital Region Heritage Rail (Canberra Railway Museum)	Operational
CPH 31	Lachlan Valley Railway	Stored
CPH 32	Dorrigo Steam Railway & Museum	Stored
CPH 34	Dorrigo Steam Railway & Museum	Stored
CPH 35	Dorrigo Steam Railway & Museum	Stored
CPH 36	Dorrigo Steam Railway & Museum	Stored
CPH 37	Capital Region Heritage Rail	Operational
CTC 51	Rail Motor Society	Under restoration	Rail Motor Trailer CTC 51
CTC 52	Dorrigo Steam Railway & Museum	Stored
CTC 53	Dorrigo Steam Railway & Museum	Stored
CTC 54	Dorrigo Steam Railway & Museum	Stored
CTC 55	Cooma-Monaro Railway	Operational

== Gallery ==
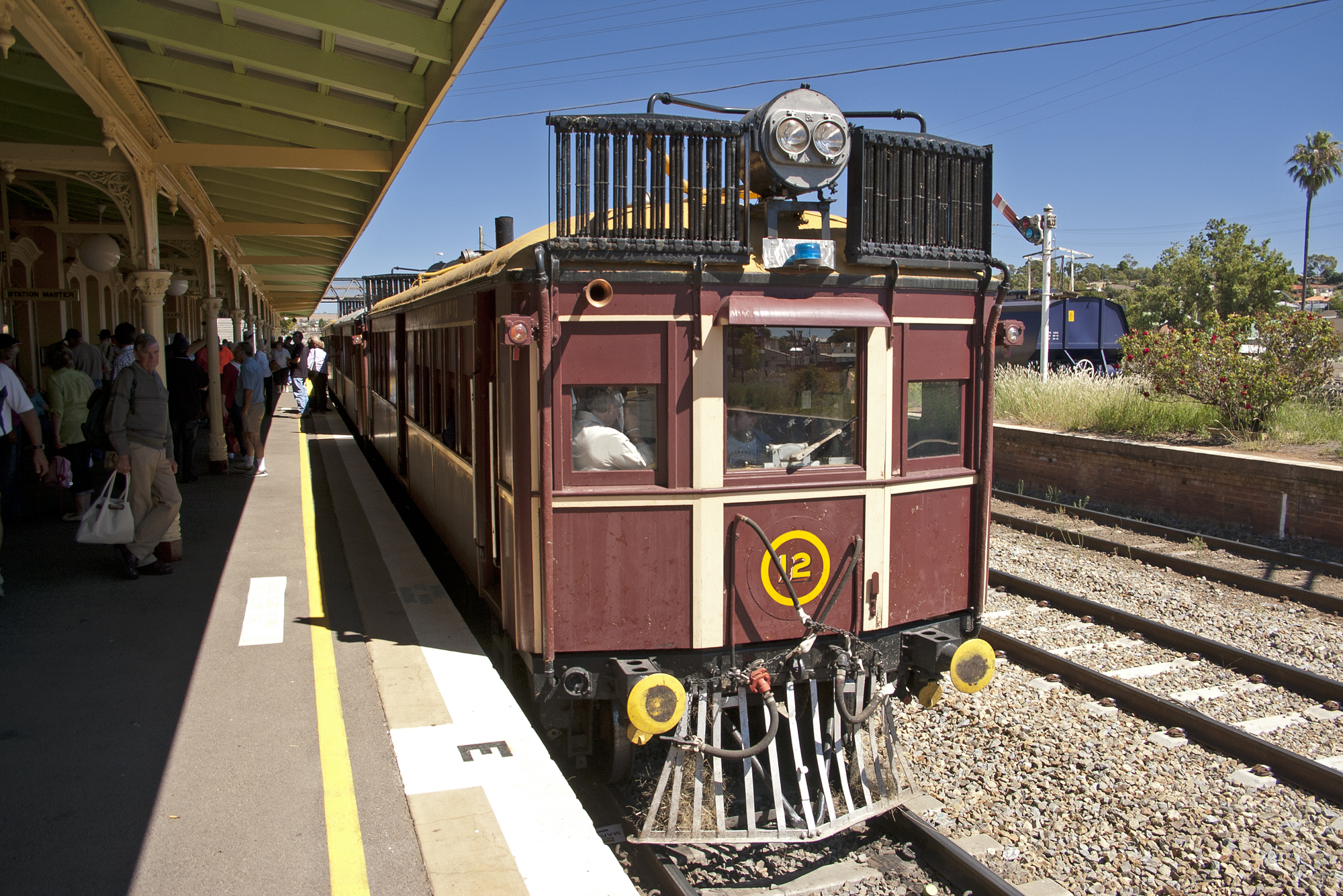
CPH 12, 25 and 24 railmotor at Junee station

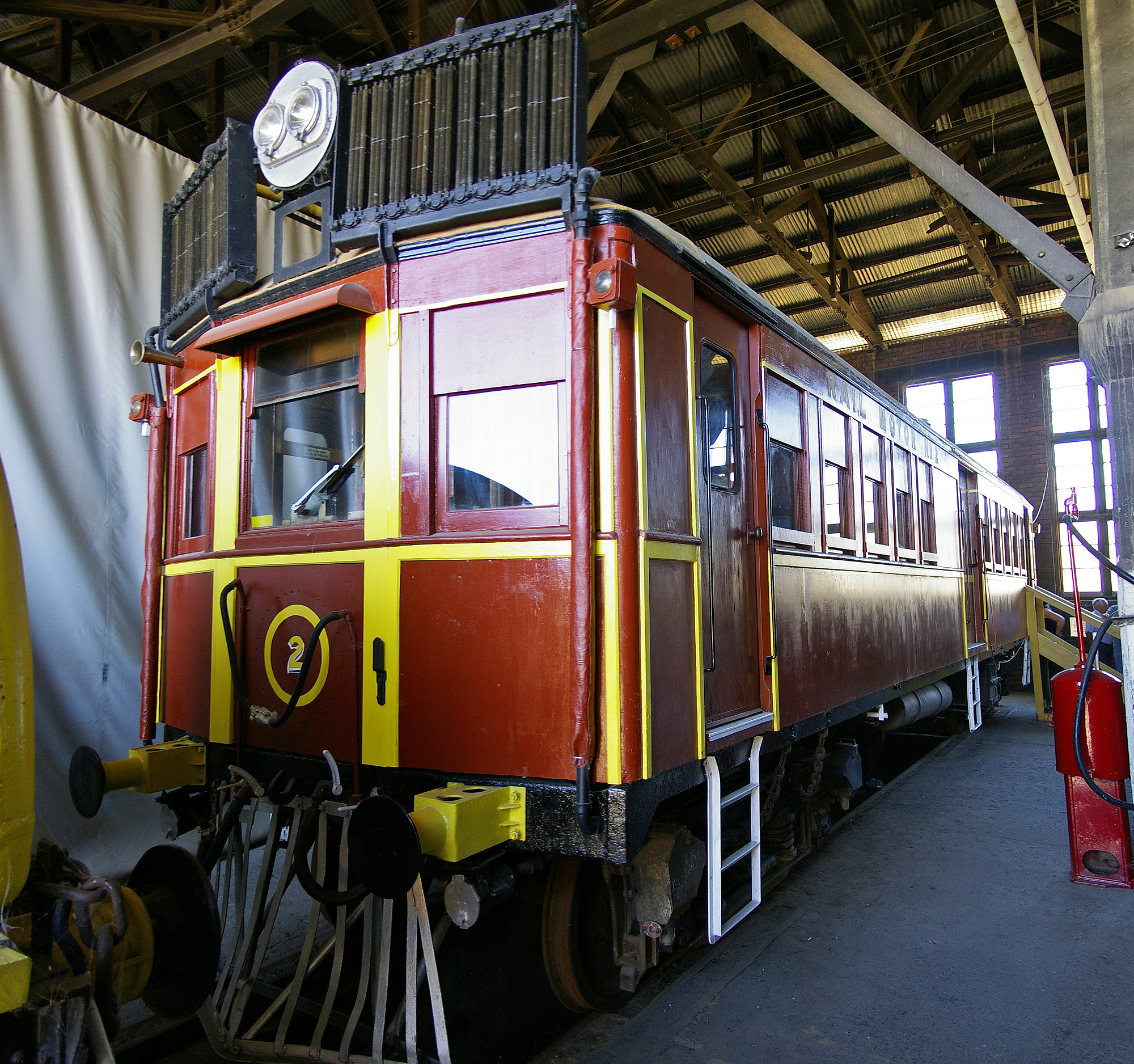
CPH 2 railmotor at the Junee Roundhouse Railway Museum

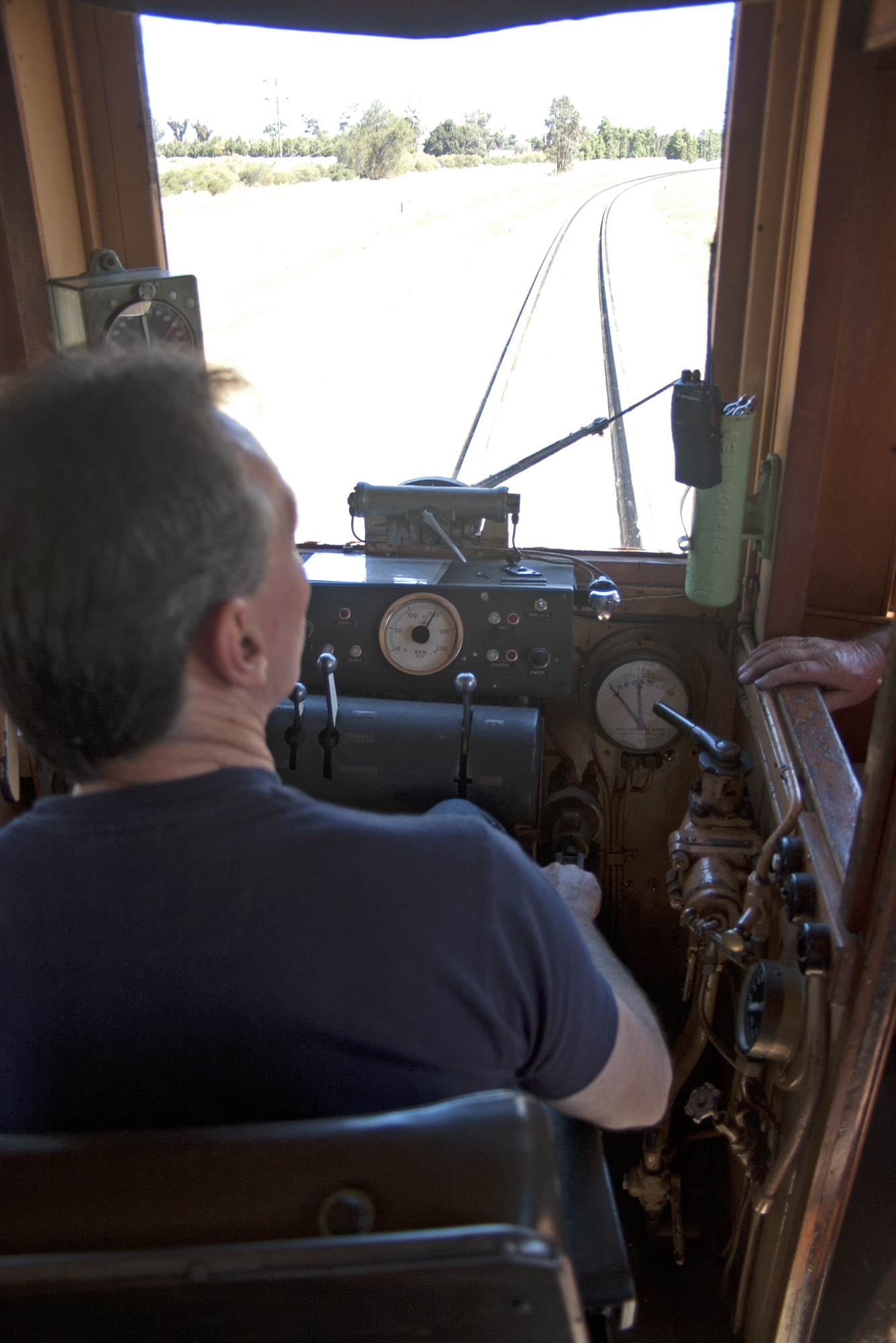
Driver's cab of CPH 24 on the Main Southern railway line

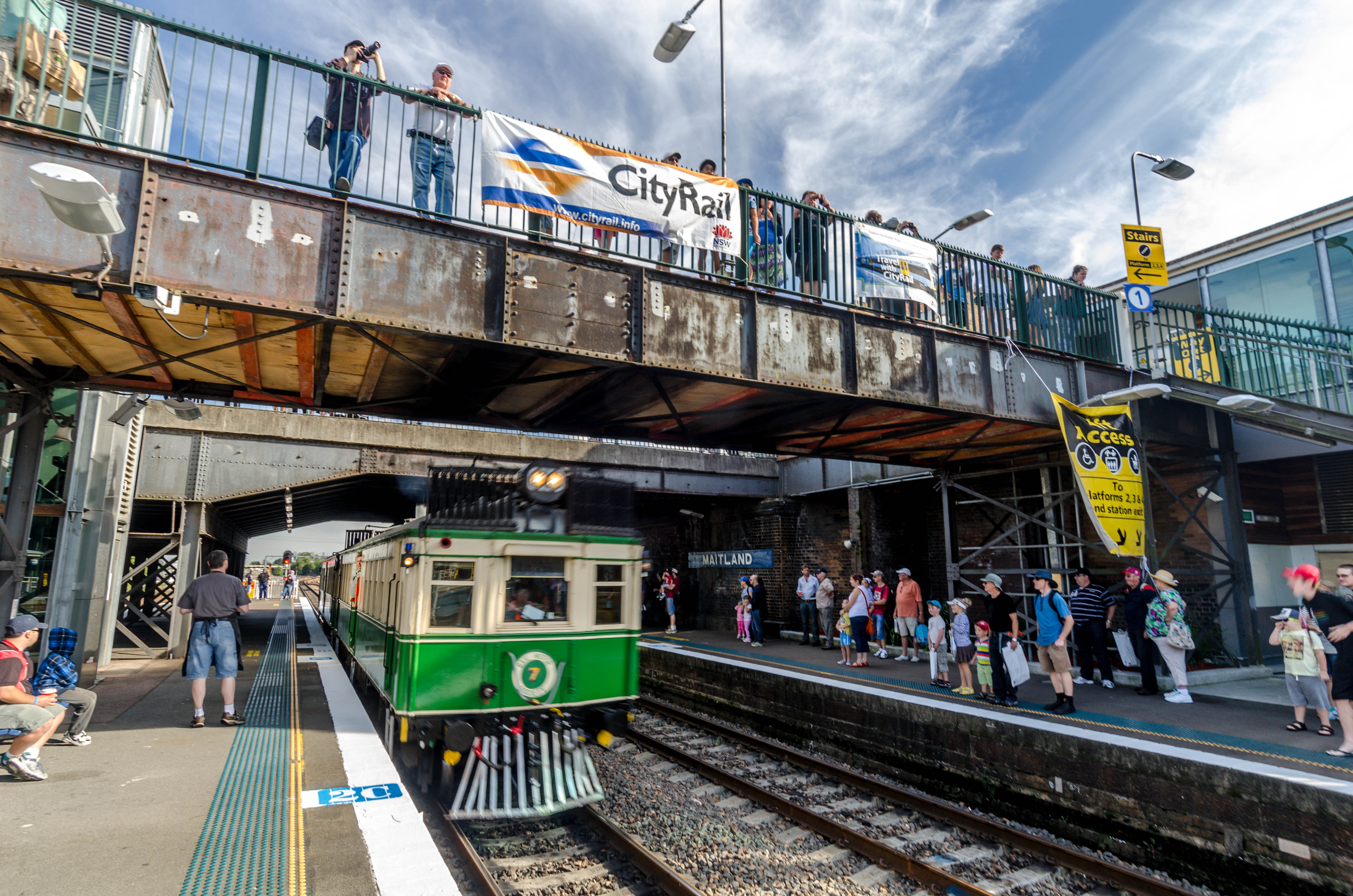
Rail Motor Society CPH 7 at the Hunter Valley Steamfest 2013

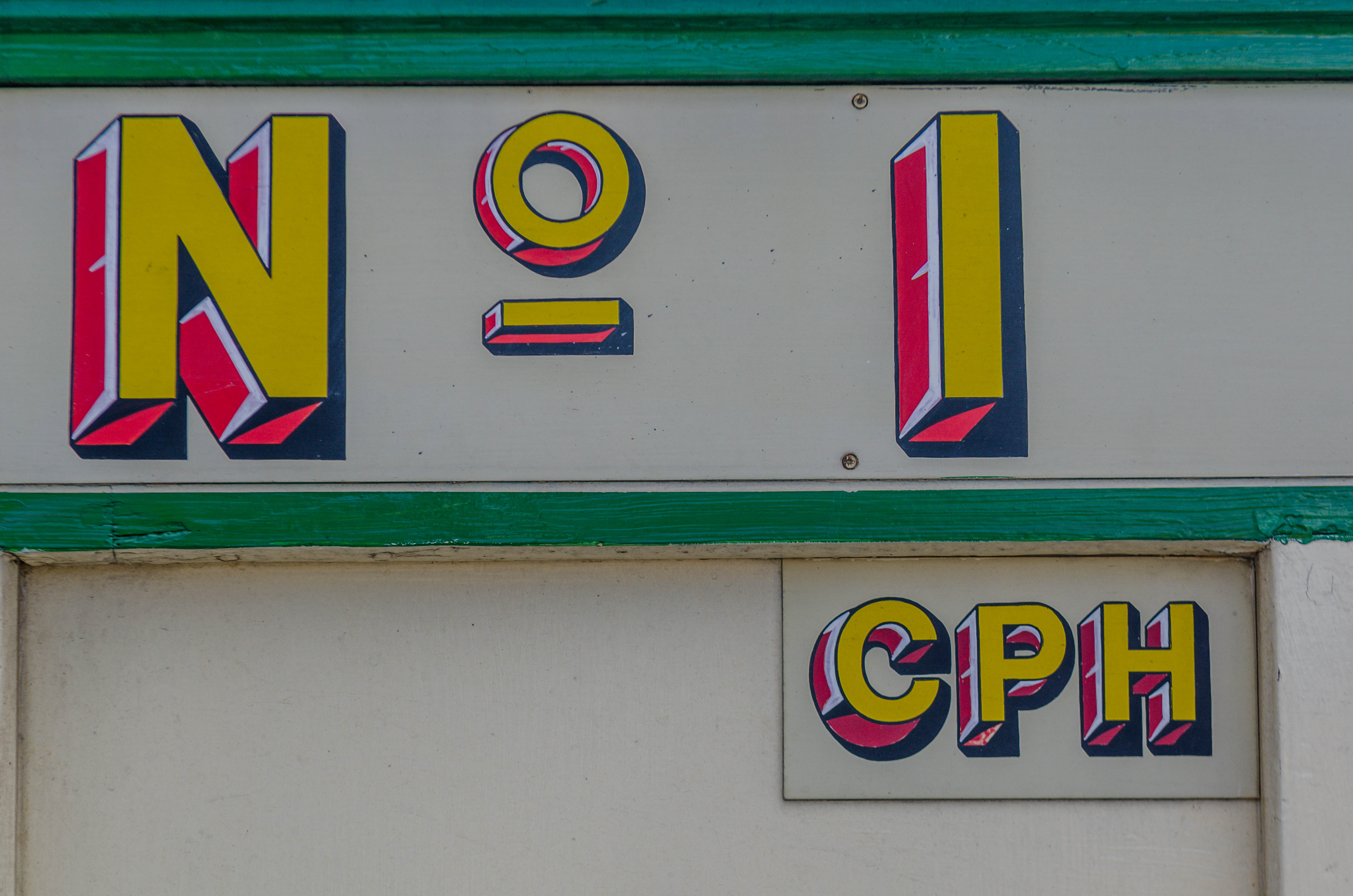
Rail Motor Society CPH 1 lettering

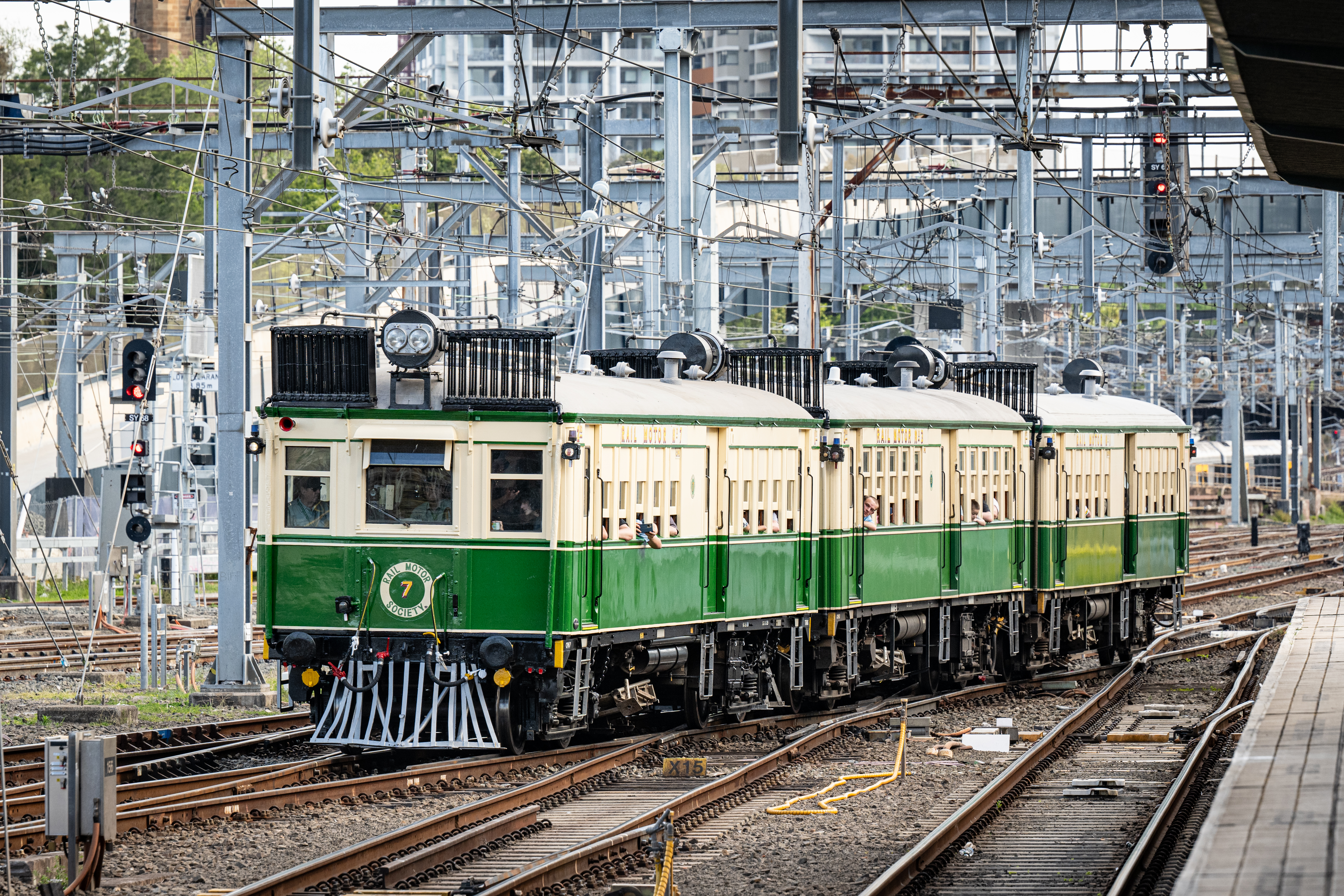
CPH 1 leads a 3-car set at Central station
