= Snowy Monaro Regional Council =

- Local government area
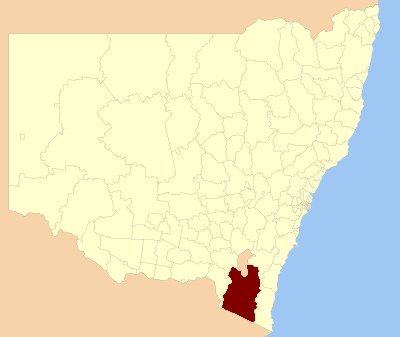
- Location in New South Wales
- Interactive map of Snowy Monaro Regional Council
- Coordinates: 36.232°S 149.130°E
- Country: Australia
- State: New South Wales
- Region: Snowy Mountains; Monaro
- Established: 12 May 2016
- Council seat: Cooma

Government
  - Mayor: Chris Hanna
  - State electorate: Monaro
  - Federal division: Eden-Monaro

Area
  - Total: 15,162 km^{2} (5,854 sq mi)

Population
  - Total: 21,666 (LGA 2021)
LGAs around Snowy Monaro Regional Council
Snowy Valleys	Australian Capital Territory	Queanbeyan-Palerang
Snowy Valleys	Snowy Monaro Regional Council	Eurobodalla
East Gippsland (Vic)	East Gippsland (Vic)	Bega Valley

The Snowy Monaro Regional Council is a local government area located in the Snowy Mountains and Monaro regions of New South Wales, Australia. The council was formed on 12 May 2016 through a forced merger of the Bombala, Cooma-Monaro and Snowy River shires.

The council comprises an area of 15,162 square kilometres (5,854 sq mi) and occupies the higher slopes of the eastern side of the Great Dividing Range between the Australian Capital Territory to the north and the state boundary with Victoria to the south. At the time of its establishment the council had an estimated population of 20,707. Its population at the 2021 census was 21,666.

The Mayor of the Snowy Monaro Regional Council is Chris Hanna since 21 September 2023.

== Towns and localities ==
The following towns are located within Snowy Monaro Regional Council:

- Adaminaby
- Berridale
- Bombala
- Cooma
- Delegate
- Jindabyne
- Nimmitabel

The following localities are located within Snowy Monaro Regional Council:

- Ando
- Anembo
- Anglers Reach
- Arable
- Avonside
- Badja
- Beloka
- Bibbenluke
- Billilingra
- Binjura
- Blue Cow
- Bobundara
- Bolaro
- Braemar Bay
- Bredbo
- Buckenderra
- Bumbalong
- Bungarby
- Bunyan
- Burra (part)
- Carlaminda
- Chakola
- Cathcart
- Clear Range
- Colinton
- Coolringdon
- Cootralantra
- Corrowong
- Countegany
- Crackenback
- Craigie
- Creewah
- Dairymans Plains
- Dalgety
- Dangelong
- Dry Plains
- East Jindabyne
- Eucumbene
- Frying Pan
- Glen Allen
- Glen Fergus
- Gooandra
- Greenlands
- Grosses Plain
- Guthega
- Hill Top
- Ingebirah
- Ironmungy
- Jerangle
- Jimenbuen
- Jingera
- Kalkite
- Kiandra
- Kybeyan
- Long Plain
- Lords Hill
- Maffra
- Merriangaah
- Michelago
- Middle Flat
- Middlingbank
- Mila
- Moonbah
- Murrumbucca
- Myalla
- Nimmo
- Numbla Vale
- Numeralla
- Nungar
- Old Adaminaby
- Palarang
- Paupong
- Peak View
- Perisher
- Pine Valley
- Polo Flat
- Quidong
- Rhine Falls
- Rock Flat
- Rockton
- Rocky Plain
- Rose Valley
- Rosemeath
- Shannons Flat
- Smiggin Holes
- Springfield
- Steeple Flat
- Tantangara
- The Angle
- The Brothers
- Thredbo
- Tinderry
- Tolbar
- Tombong
- Tuross
- Wambrook
- Williamsdale (part)
- Winifred
- Yaouk

== Heritage listings ==
The Snowy Monaro Region has a number of heritage-listed sites, including:

- Bombala, Goulburn-Bombala railway: Bombala railway station
- Bombala, 91 Main Road: Crankies Plain Bridge
- Bredbo, Goulburn-Bombala railway: Bredbo Rail Bridge
- Cooma, Bradley Street: Cooma railway station
- Cooma, 59–61 Lambie Street: Royal Hotel
- Cooma, Sharp Street: Rock Bolting Development Site
- Eucumbene, Old Adaminaby and Lake Eucumbene
- Kiandra: Kiandra Courthouse
- Kiandra: Matthews Cottage

== Demographics ==
The population for the predecessor councils was estimated in 2013 as:

- 2,401 in Bombala Shire
- 10,073 in Cooma-Monaro Shire and
- 8,087 in Snowy River Shire.

At the 2021 census there were 21,666 people in the Snowy Monaro Regional Council local government area; of these 51.5% were male and 48.5% were female. Aboriginal and Torres Strait Islander people made up 3.1% of the population; the NSW and Australian averages are 3.4 and 3.2% respectively. The median age of people in the Snowy Monaro Regional Council was 43 years; the national median is 38 years. 78.9% of the population were born in Australia and 85.8% of households only speak English at home.

Selected historical census data for Snowy Monaro Regional Council local government area
Census year		2016	2021
Population	Estimated residents on census night	20,218	▲21,666
Population	LGA rank in terms of population size within New South Wales	69th	▲68th
Population	% of New South Wales population	0.27%	0.27%
Population	% of Australian population	0.09%	0.09%
Cultural and language diversity			
Ancestry, top responses	Australian	41.3%	▼39.8%
Ancestry, top responses	English	39.2%	▲39.8%
Ancestry, top responses	Irish	12.3%	▲12.8%
Ancestry, top responses	Scottish	11.0%	▲12.5%
Ancestry, top responses	German	5.4%	5.4%
Language, used at home (other than English)	German	0.9%	▼0.7%
Language, used at home (other than English)	Italian	0.4%	0.4%
Language, used at home (other than English)	Mandarin	0.4%	▲0.7%
Language, used at home (other than English)	French	0.2%	0.2%
Language, used at home (other than English)	Dutch	0.2%	0.2%
Language, used at home (other than English)	Thai	0.2%	▲0.3%
Language, used at home (other than English)	Spanish	0.1%	▲0.5%
Religious affiliation			
Religious affiliation, top responses	No religion, so described	29.8%	▲41.6%
Religious affiliation, top responses	Catholic	23.6%	▼20.3%
Religious affiliation, top responses	Anglican	20.4%	▼16.0%
Religious affiliation, top responses	Not stated	12.2%	▼9.2%
Religious affiliation, top responses	Uniting Church	2.7%	▼2.4%
Median weekly incomes			
Personal income	Median weekly personal income	A$675	A$835
Personal income	% of Australian median income	102.0%	103.7%
Family income	Median weekly family income	A$1,569	A$2,092
Family income	% of Australian median income	90.5%	98.7%
Household income	Median weekly household income	A$1,200	A$1,593
Household income	% of Australian median income	83.4%	91.2%

== Council ==
The Snowy Monaro Regional Council comprises eleven Councillors elected proportionally in a single ward. The Councillors elected for a fixed four-year term of office with effect from 4 December 2021 were: Hanna was re-elected mayor while Hopkins became deputy mayor in the 2024 council elections. New councillor Andrew Thaler was sworn in October 2024, but has subsequently been suspended three times due to his behaviour.

Councillor	Party	Notes
Christopher Hanna	Independent	Current Mayor 2023–present
Tanya Higgins	Labor	Deputy Mayor 2022–24
Narelle Davis	Independent	Mayor 2022–2023
Tricia Hopkins	Independent	Deputy Mayor 2024–present
Karlee Johnson	Independent	Elected as Karlee Pateman, switched to using her married name shortly thereafter.
Bob Stewart	Independent	Re-elected
Lynda Summers	Labor	
Luke Williamson	Independent	Elected via countback in August 2022, following resignation of John Last.
John Last	Independent	Resigned July 2022. Replaced by Luke Williamson following countback.
John Castellari	The Greens	Resigned August 2022. Replaced by Craig Mitchell following countback.
Peter Beer	Independent	Re-elected
Louise Frolich	Independent	
Craig Mitchell	Independent	Elected via countback in October 2022, following resignation of John Castellari.
Andrew Thaler	Independent	Elected 2024

== Election results ==
=== 2024 ===
2024 New South Wales local elections: Snowy Monaro
Party	Candidate	Votes	%	±%
Independent	1. Chris Hanna (elected 1); 2. Tricia Hopkins (elected 6); 3. Karlee Johnson; 4. Cindy Chawner; 5. Anne O'Leary; 6. Guy Palframan	2,130	18.5	−20.0
Labor	1. Tanya Higgins (elected 2); 2. Lynda Summers (elected 7); 3. Bill Walker; 4. Anthony Garvin; 5. Penny Judge; 6. Kylie Phillips	1,924	16.7	+0.4
Independent	1. Bob Stewart (elected 3); 2. Nick Elliott (elected 9); 3. Megan Downie; 4. Cathy Ingram; 5. Suzanne Bate; 6. Richard Murphy; 7. Michael Downie	1,734	15.0	+7.1
Team Williamson	1. Luke Williamson (elected 4); 2. Mick Newman; 3. Vele Civijovski; 4. Hamish Williamson; 5. Michael Freeman; 6. Nicholas Kopievsky; 7. Katherine Corbett	1,505	13.0	+9.7
Reuben Rose Group	1. Reuben Rose (elected 5); 2. Chris Chan; 3. Sidonie Carpenter; 4. Stuart McKenzie; 5. Shawn Joynt; 6. Jeremy Meeks	1,293	11.2	
John Rooney's Blue Team	1. John Rooney (elected 11); 2. Anna Lucas; 3. Bernard Rooney; 4. Adrian Ljubic; 5. Fiona Foster; 6. Catherine Turnbull	585	5.1	+3.3
Independent	1. Andrew Thaler (elected 10); 2. Charles Kolano; 3. Nicolaas Luntungan; 4. Michal Chotar; 5. Faye Simpson; 6. Allen Simpson; 7. Kylie Paske	545	4.7	+2.8
Independent	Narelle Davis (elected 8)	342	3.0	
Independent	Lynley Miners	314	2.7	
Independent	Craig Mitchell	231	2.0	−0.5
Independent	Vickie Pollard	202	1.8	−0.6
Independent	Maree Stevenson	175	1.5	
Independent	Peter Beer	170	1.5	−2.4
Shooters, Fishers, Farmers	Mathieu Nolte	140	1.2	
Independent	1. James Gilbert; 2. Lionel Harris; 3. Dave Chatterton	133	1.2	
Independent	Rachelle Edwards	51	0.4	
Independent	Bernie McDonald	35	0.3	
Independent	Barry Bridges	19	0.2	
Independent	Oliver Moran	13	0.1	
Independent	Malcolm Bruce	8	0.1	0.0
Total formal votes		11,547	92.9	
Informal votes		880	7.1	
Turnout		12,427	83.5	

== See also ==
- Local government areas of New South Wales
