= Shannons Flat =

- Town
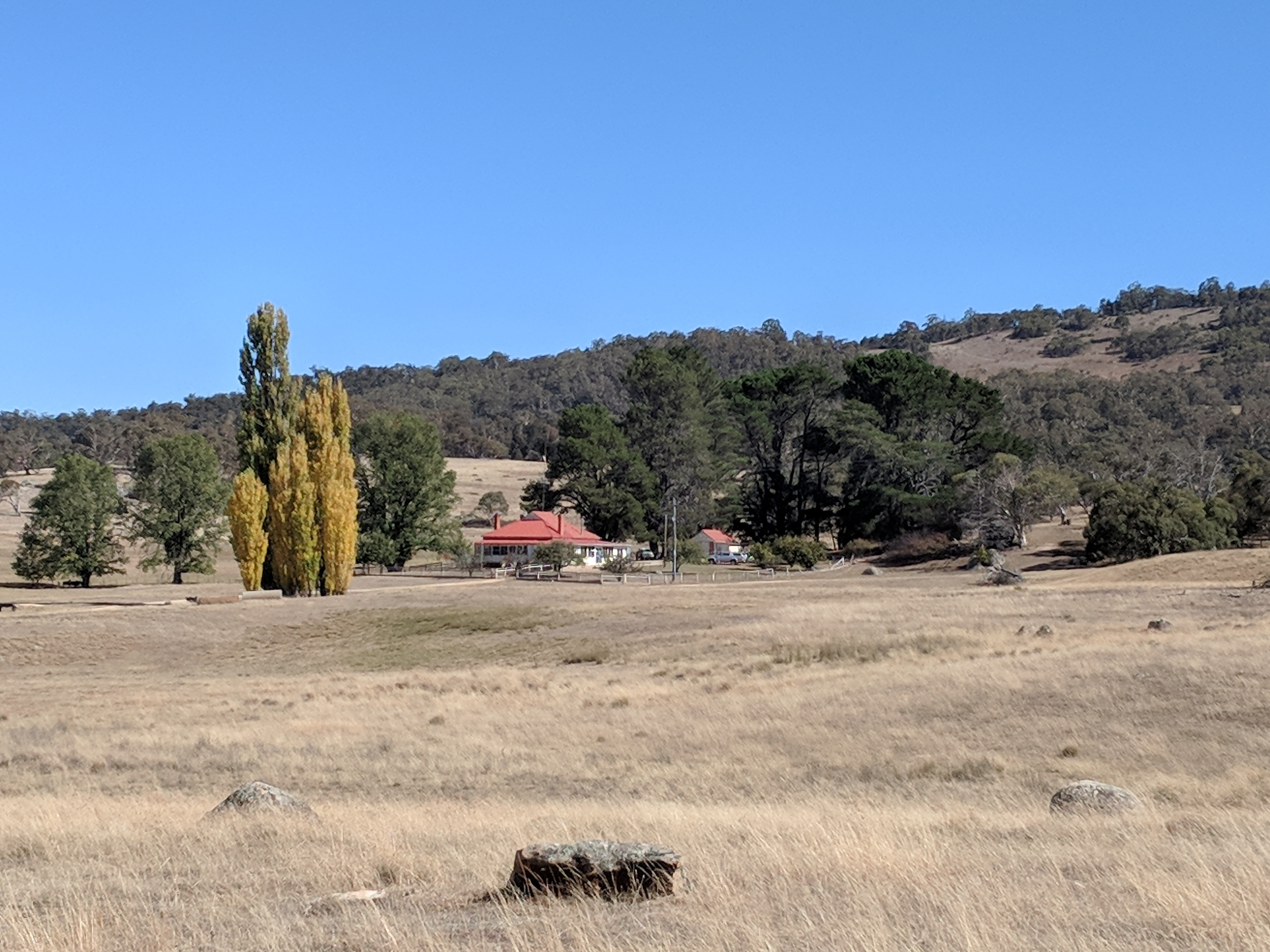

- Coordinates: 35°56′0″S 148°57′0″E
- Country: Australia
- State: New South Wales
- LGA: Snowy Monaro Regional Council
- Location: 368 km (229 mi) SW of Sydney; 87 km (54 mi) SW of Canberra; 40 km (25 mi) NW of Cooma

Government
  - State electorate: Monaro
  - Federal division: Eden-Monaro
- Elevation: 1,100 m (3,600 ft)

Population
  - Total: 78 (2016 census)
- Postcode: 2630
Localities around Shannons Flat
Yaouk	ACT	Colinton
Bolaro	Shannons Flat	Bredbo
Dry Plain	Murrumbucca	Billilingra

Shannons Flat is a locality in the Monaro region of New South Wales, Australia. The town is in the Snowy Monaro Regional Council local government area, sandwiched between the southern border of the Namadgi National Park in the Australian Capital Territory and the Murrumbidgee River. Shannons Flat also adjoins the NSW localities of Yaouk, Bolaro, Murrumbucca, Bredbo and Billilingra. It is about 308 kilometres (191 mi) south west of the state capital, Sydney, and 70 kilometres (40 mi) from the Australian national capital of Canberra. It is just over 40 kilometres (25 mi) north west of the regional centre, Cooma.

At the 2016 census, Shannons Flat had a population of 78.

== Geography ==
Shannons Flat is in the Monaro region of the Snowy Mountains and is mostly between 1,000 and 1,400 metres (3,300 and 4,600 ft) above sea-level, so usually receives several snowfalls every year. Significant geographic features include Mt Roberts (1,450 metres (4,760 ft) with sweeping views across the Monaro), and Alum Creek and Jones Creek which both flow southward into the Murrumbidgee River. The geology of the area includes a rock called Shannons Flat Granodiorite.

Two major roads run through the area. The Shannons Flat Road/Yaouk Road route runs from Cooma north west towards Yaouk, and the Bobeyan Road runs from Tharwa on the southern edge of Canberra south west to Adaminaby. At the junction of these two routes, the local community hall stands adjacent to the Rural Fire Service shed. The Bobeyan Road is the shortest route from Canberra to Adaminaby and the Selwyn Snowfields ski resort, but is usually avoided by tourists due to the usually poor condition of the gravel sections of the road. Other local roads include Jones Plain Road, Callemondah Road and Wrights Hill Road.

== History ==
The Shannons Flat area was founded as far back at 1840. An early route to Kiandra ran through the area. The school at Shannons Flat was opened in early 1906;

A small school (called Alum Creek School) operated from July 1887 to August 1897. The Shannons Flat/Yaouk area was initially isolated from the general spread of early settlement which came through Bredbo and Bunyan and moved further south. The original squatters to Yaouk were more likely to arrive by crossing the Murrumbidgee near Bredbo and travelling north west through rough country before getting to open plains. The Statistical Returns of 1831 listed J Slake (probably Blake) as holding the Yayak (Yaouk) station and the Brayshaws settled in the Bobeyan Valley during the 1840s. Archibald Crawford bought the Yaouk run in partnership with Lachlan Cochrane, but Crawford had to retire from the partnership in 1864. The property is still owned by the Cochrane family. For many years, the district relied primarily on the town of Adaminaby for supplies and services. The poet Barcroft Boake who lived in the region in the 1880s based some of his poems on places and events in the area.

While Shannons Flat never grew into a village, a school was opened in 1906; it was a one-teacher school with a residence, with as many as 14 students at one time. The school operated until 1965 and a few years later the building was transferred to Peak View. The Bell family of Shannons Flat had the first telephone in the area, in 1918. The community hall was built in 1946 on land donated by the Luton family. For many years the mail was delivered once each week - the mailman came and stayed the weekend, returning to Cooma on Monday with mail and wood or wool. Many stories of the early families and properties in Shannons Flat and southern Namadgi are included in the book Memories Before Namadgi by Daphne Curtis.

== Industry ==
Agriculture is primarily sheep and cattle grazing. A potential wind farm development by CBD Energy Limited is currently in hiatus. This generated national media attention in 2009 when Peter Spencer, a local farmer went on a hunger strike suspended 6 metres up a tower used for monitoring wind speeds.

The local community hall is used for occasional dances, markets and community meetings.

A school bus service operates from Shannons Flat into Cooma. There are two public primary schools in Cooma, including Cooma Public School and Cooma North Public School, both providing education for students in kindergarten to year 6. Monaro High School is in Cooma and serves the town and neighbouring rural towns and villages. There is a Roman Catholic school called St Patrick's Parish School providing education from kindergarten to year 10. Cooma also has a private Christian school known as Snowy Mountains Christian School. TAFE NSW Illawarra Institute Cooma Campus provides further education. Adaminaby also has a Public Primary School.
