= Bredbo =

- Town
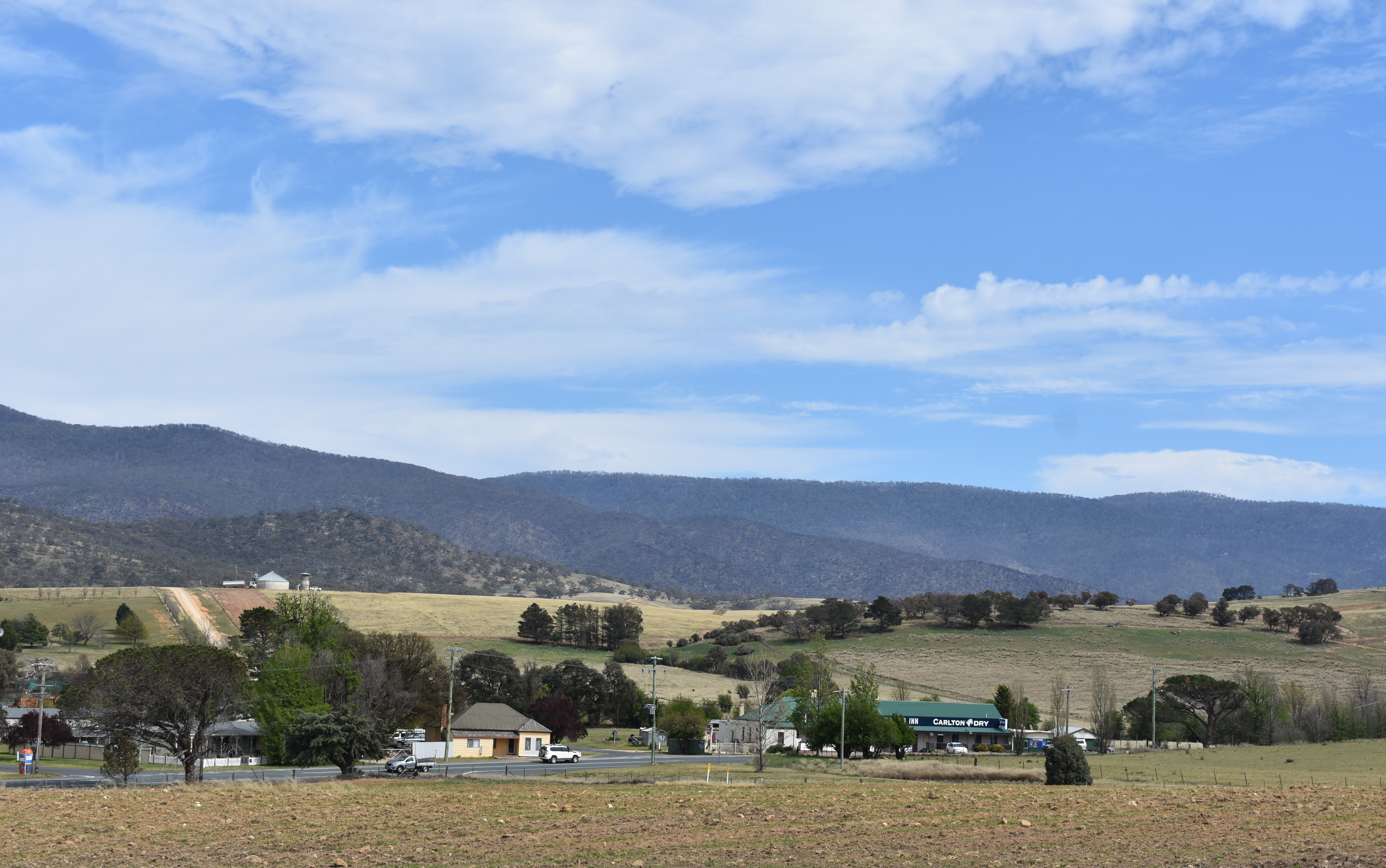
- Bredbo, 2020

- Coordinates: 35°57′0″S 149°09′0″E
- Country: Australia
- State: New South Wales
- LGA: Snowy Monaro Regional Council
- Location: 366 km (227 mi) SW of Sydney; 83 km (52 mi) S of Canberra; 34 km (21 mi) N of Cooma

Government
  - State electorate: Monaro
  - Federal division: Eden-Monaro
- Elevation: 704 m (2,310 ft)

Population
  - Total: 352 (2016 census)
- Postcode: 2626
Localities around Bredbo
ACT	Colinton	Jerangle
Shannons Flat	Bredbo	Jerangle
Billilingra	Billilingra	Peak View

Bredbo is a village on the Monaro plains of New South Wales, Australia. The village is on the Monaro Highway 34 kilometres (21 mi) north of Cooma. The village is in the Snowy Monaro Regional Council and had a population of 352 at the 2016 census.

== History ==
The Bredbo region was originally Ngarigo country. In the early 1830s, the first British colonist to appropriate land in the area was William Bradley who named his grazing property Ballebalaing. Bradley took the land by force from the Ngarigo people and in a skirmish with a local clan near the Bredbo River, he shot up and dispersed the Aborigines with his revolver.

Located at the junction of the Bredbo and Murrumbidgee rivers, the Bredbo area was historically prone to flooding. As a way-point on the road from Sydney to the Snowy Mountains, travellers were frequently stranded by rising water. By 1839 the Bredbo Inn had been established to accommodate travellers. The Inn was a Cobb and Co stagecoach post, with stables located behind the Inn which are still standing today.

The surrounding settlement was developed to support squatters' runs established in the district between 1834 and 1850. Bredbo was officially proclaimed a village in 1888.

Gold was discovered in the area by the Reverend William Branwhite Clarke, who also discovered gold at Kiandra. A field was proclaimed along the Bredbo River, which was worked until 1921. In the 1930s a geological survey was undertaken and a mine opened and operated until 1942. The fields at Cowra Creek were worked from 1888 and are still popular for fossicking.

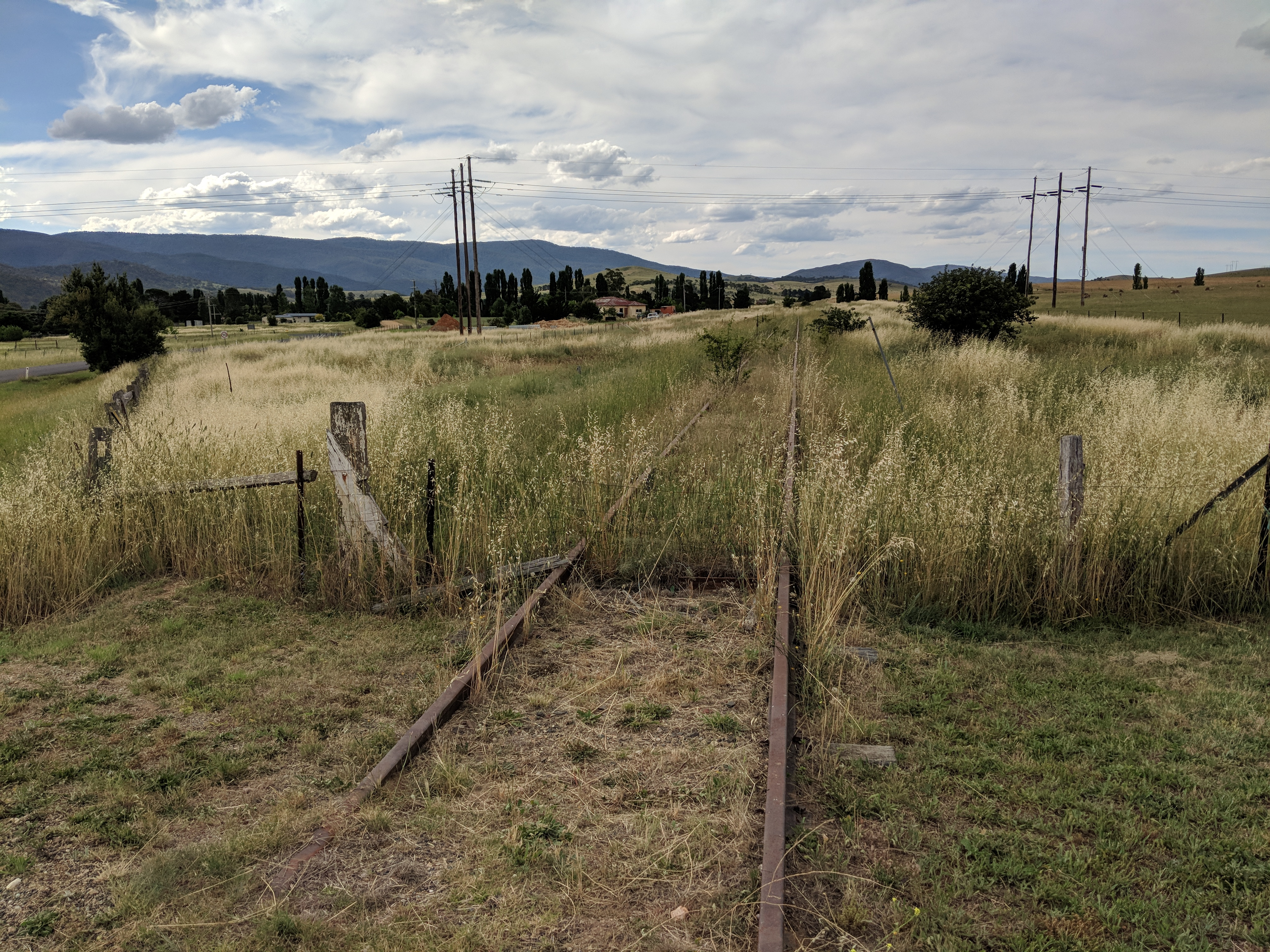
Bombala Railway in Bredbo

Bredbo sits on the Bombala railway line which reached the town in 1889 at which time there were eight houses. The railway closed in 1989 however one final "Farewell to Bredbo" special train was run from Canberra on 3 March 1990.

In the early 20th century, the Australian poet Banjo Paterson stayed at the Bredbo Inn. It is here that Paterson may have encountered the notable stockman Charlie McKeahnie, a likely source of inspiration for Paterson's epic poem The Man From Snowy River. McKeahnie was renowned for his risky riding, and was eventually killed in a horse race over the Bredbo bridge. Following the accident the fatally wounded McKeahnie was carried to the Inn, where he died of his injuries.

One of the earliest settlers in the Bredbo district, John Cosgrove of Billilingera, was believed to be the largest landholder in southern New South Wales. In one year 68,000 sheep were shorn in the Billilingera shearing shed.

== Heritage listings ==
Bredbo has a number of heritage-listed sites, including:

- Goulburn-Bombala railway: Bredbo Rail Bridge

== Village life ==
Bredbo's community is supported by an active Community Association and through a number of activities on the local events calendar.

Bredbo is well located for access to the service town of Cooma and all the resources of Canberra. It is an easy drive from Bredbo to the ski resorts of Perisher Blue, Thredbo and Mt Selwyn. Locals receive discounts at some of these resorts. There are also extensive mountain bike trails and events in the Thredbo area.

The village hosts a number of small businesses and eateries.

Art and craft is a growing feature of the community, with a number of creative artists resident in the area. These include the children's label Milli and Max; artist Lucy Culliton; and Canberra-region design collective, The Lost and Found Office. Locally made goods are available in a number of the village shops. Bredbo is also home to the Bredbo Christmas Barn, which is a popular stop for passing traffic and day trips from Canberra and the surrounding areas.

Post is delivered residents on Monday, Wednesday and Friday with a parcel collection service run by the Bredbo Community Association.

National Broadband Network provides Fixed Wireless Internet connectivity to the Village while phone infrastructure is managed by Telstra.

Primary school-aged children attend Bredbo Public School, a small institution that provides individualized learning, leadership opportunities, and extracurricular activities. For secondary education, daily bus services transport high school students to Canberra and Cooma.

Bredbo also has a community hall, tennis and basketball courts, village green, cemetery, war memorial and recreation ground. Public toilets are located immediately behind the community hall. The Cooma-Monaro library offers a mobile library service.

Religious services are offered through St Bartholomew's Anglican Church, which is located high on a hill with views overlooking the town. The historic wooden All Saints Catholic Church is located on Walker Street.

Bredbo village is located close to the junction of the Bredbo River and Murrumbidgee River, with several fishing and swimming spots located within walking distance of the village hall.
