= New South Wales FP Pay Bus =

Series of railbuses

FP Pay Bus
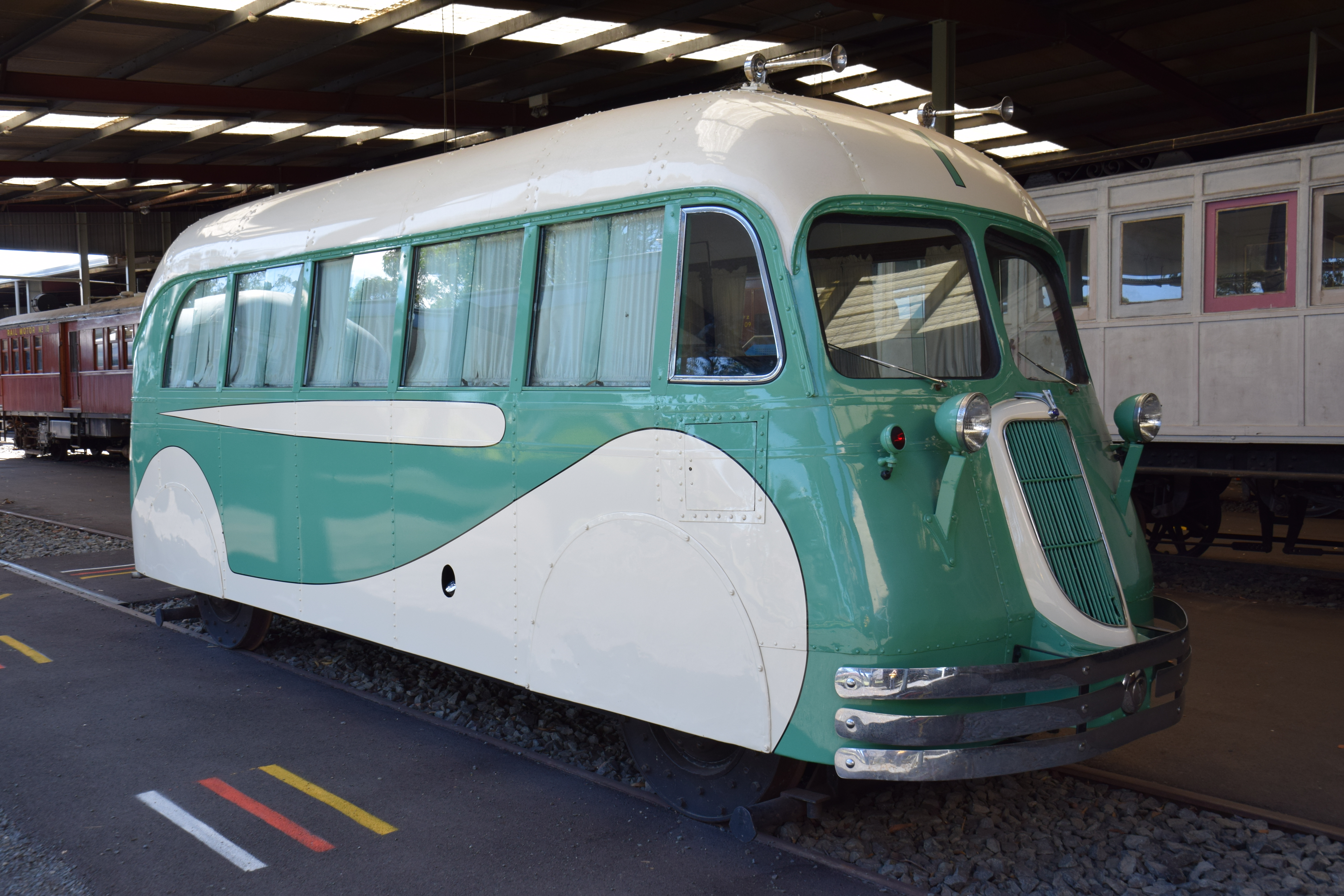
- NSWR Rail Pay Bus No.FP1 at the New South Wales Railway Museum, Thirlmere
Type and origin
- Power type: Diesel mechanical
- Builder: Waddingtons; Commonwealth Engineering
- Build date: 1937-1970
- Total produced: 14
Specifications
- Gauge: 1,435 mm (4 ft 8 1/2 in) standard gauge
- Fuel type: Diesel
Career
- Operators: Department of Railways New South Wales
- Number in class: 14
- Numbers: FP1-FP13
- First run: 7 July 1937
- Last run: 4 April 1986
- Preserved: FP1, FP7-FP13
- Disposition: 8 preserved, 6 scrapped

The FP Pay Bus are a series of thirteen small 4 wheel railbuses built for the Department of Railways New South Wales between 1937 and 1970. The rail buses were intended for use on branch lines whose low passenger numbers did not warrant the use of a larger railmotor.

== FP1 ==
FP1 was designed by the Road Motor Vehicles section of the Department of Railways & constructed by Waddingtons. It was placed into service on 7 July 1937. It was originally powered by a Ford Mercury V8 side-valve petrol engine with a 4-speed truck-style gear box and two 30 imp gal (140 L; 36 US gal) fuel tanks. Entry was via a central door on one side only and had seating for 17 persons. The driving position was at one end only with the driver sitting on the right hand side beside the engine. The rail bus was fitted with 34 in (864 mm) diameter wheels with a 13 ft 2 in (4.01 m) long wheelbase. The body was 20 ft 0 in (6.10 m) long and 7 ft 0 in (2.13 m) wide.

By 1938, it had been converted into a pay bus and was used for the transport of pays to the more remote parts of the New South Wales railway system. In 1964, it was fitted with a new Ford Thames V8 petrol engine. FP1 was withdrawn from service on 3 October 1968 and was handed over to the New South Wales Rail Transport Museum (now the NSW Rail Museum) on 27 March 1969 for preservation. Between August 2008 and July 2009, FP1 was fully restored at Eveleigh Railway Workshops by RailCorp apprentices. After being displayed on the concourse at Central station, it was returned to Thirlmere.

== FPs 2-5 ==
The design of these 3 cars was different from that of FP1 in that they were fitted with a wider and longer body and had driving controls at both ends. They were also fitted with inward opening swing doors on both sides of the body & could seat 18 passengers. These three rail buses were fitted with 34 in (864 mm) diameter wheels with a 13 ft 2 in (4.01 m) long wheelbase. The bodies were 22 ft 8 in (6.91 m) long and 9 ft 2 in (2.79 m) wide.

=== FP2 ===
FP2 entered service at Harden on 27 September 1937. In 1942 it was transferred to the Mechanical Branch and was then used as a pay bus. FP2 was withdrawn in November 1969 and scrapped in December 1970.

=== FP3 ===
FP3 entered service at Cowra on 27 September 1937 and was initially used on the Cowra-Grenfell service. By 1939 it was being used as a pay bus. FP3 was withdrawn from service on 3 November 1969 and was scrapped in December 1970.

=== FP4 ===
FP4 entered service at Cowra on 27 September 1937 and like FP3 was also used on the Cowra-Grenfell service. By 1939 it was being used as a pay bus. In 1947 FP4 was returned to Commonwealth Engineering and fitted with a canopy roof. During 1965 it was loaned to the Way & Works Branch for use on track inspection on the branches in the Werris Creek area. A fractured chassis caused its withdrawal from service in September 1967. It was written off in November 1969 and scrapped in December 1970.

=== FP5 (1st) ===
FP5 entered service in September 1937. By 1939 it was being used as a pay bus. FP5 was destroyed by an explosion in a payroll robbery attempt at Yanderra on the Main South line on 8 December 1941. This attempted robbery killed all three rail employees that were aboard the pay bus at the time of the explosion. The remains of FP5 were written off in 1942.

== FP6 & FP5 (2nd) ==
These 2 rail buses saw a return to having only a driving position at one end only along with only having a door on one side. The door on these buses however was a siding door instead of the swing door on the previous rail buses.

=== FP6 ===
FP6 entered service at Harden in September 1937. By 1939 it was being used as a pay bus. It was withdrawn from service in May 1968, condemned on 3 November 1969 and scrapped in December 1970.

=== FP5 (2nd) ===
FP5 (2nd) was built as a replacement for the first FP5 which had been destroyed in December 1941. The chassis was based on a 1942 Ford truck chassis and a hydraulic braking system was fitted. FP5 (2nd) was also built as new as a pay bus and entered service in September 1945. FP5 was stored in October 1968 but was recalled for use at Newcastle in July 1969. Due to poor condition it was stored again on 20 October 1969, withdrawn on 3 November 1969 and scrapped on 5 December 1970.

== FPs7-12 ==
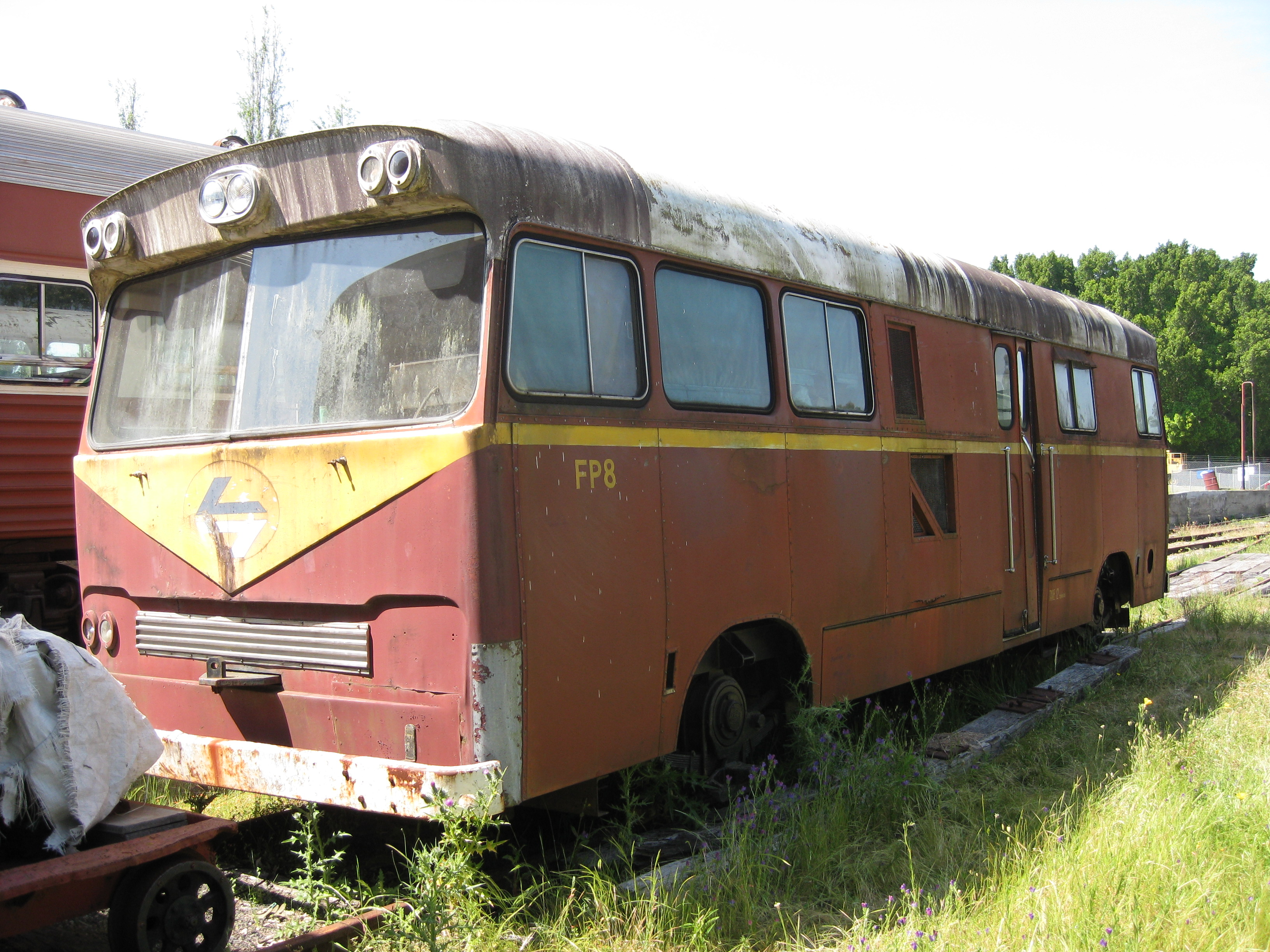
Preserved FP 8 at the Richmond Vale Railway Museum in October 2011

To replace the aging fleet of existing pay buses, six new pay buses were ordered from Commonwealth Engineering in 1967. These new pay buses had a longer and squarer body & were mounted on a 4 wheel chassis powered by an underfloor 6 cylinder Leyland model 0.400 horizontal diesel engine driving one axle via a Voith Diwabus model 501 fully automatic hydraulic/mechanical transmission & reversing gearbox. This then was coupled to a Voith E13 final drive on one of the axles. They had inward opening doors on both sides & a driving position at each end. The wheelbase of these pay buses was 18 ft 0 in (5.49 m), with a 30 ft 0 in (9.14 m) long body. These cars were also fitted with air conditioning. The front was taken from Commonwealth Engineering's standard bus model.

FP7 entered service on 9 April 1968, with the last on 23 July 1968.

In April 1970 FP7 was stripped internally and fitted with carpet on the walls and floor and movable chairs installed as well as being repainted externally. This so it could carry Queen Elizabeth II and her party between Coffs Harbour Jetty and Coffs Harbour station. After this use the FP7 was returned to its original condition, excepting that the carpet was kept on the floor.

== FP13 ==
FP13 was built at the same time as FP7 - FP12 but unlike FP7-12 it was built purely as a rail bus, with FP13 being designed to carry 18 passengers in nine 2 seat throw over reversible seats. FP13 was used as a rail bus on the Cooma-Bombala service. It entered service in February 1970. It suffered a seized engine in February 1974 which coupled with a fuel strike saw the withdrawal of the rail bus service. FP13 was stored until March 1980 when it entered Eveleigh Carriage Workshops for conversion to a pay bus.

== FP 7-13 withdrawal and preservation ==
In April 1986, the operation of railway pay buses ceased with the last service being worked by FP11 on 4 April 1986 between Lithgow and Clyde. All seven were preserved:

- FP7 Goulburn Rail Heritage Centre
- FP8 Richmond Vale Railway Museum
- FP9 Dorrigo Steam Railway & Museum
- FP10 Crookwell Heritage Railway
- FP11 Cooma Monaro Railway
- FP12 Crookwell Heritage Railway
- FP13 Dorrigo Steam Railway & Museum
