= Cooma Monaro Railway =

Heritage railway museum in New South Wales, Australia

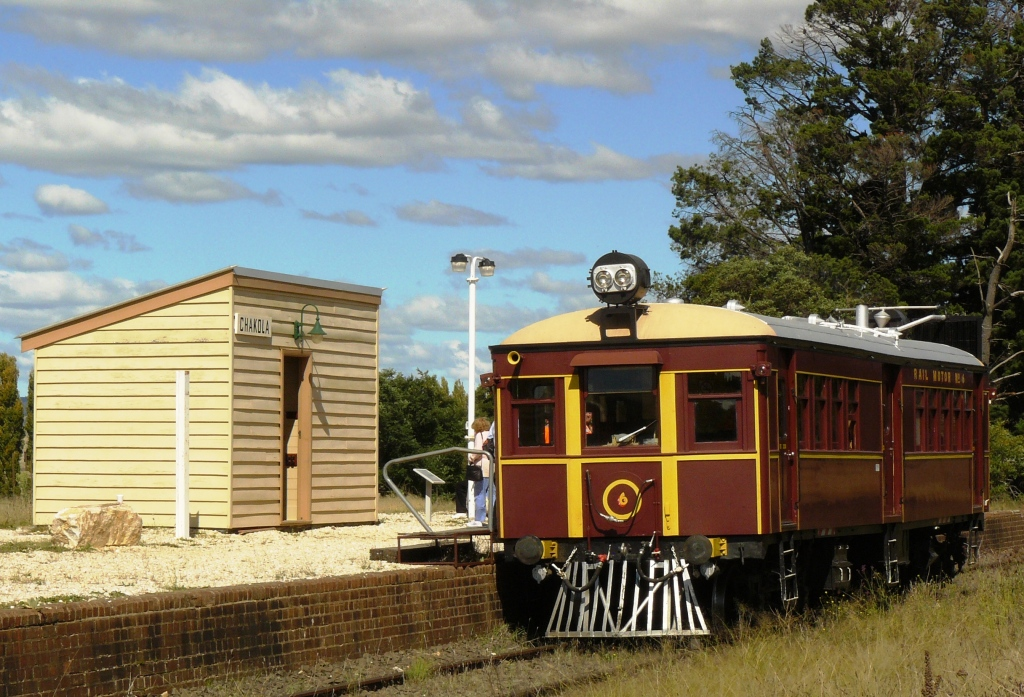
- CPH6 at Chakola station in March 2012
- Coordinates: 36°14′11″S 149°08′07″E

Commercial operations
- Name: Bombala line
- Built by: New South Wales Government Railways
- Original gauge: 1,435 mm (4 ft 8 1/2 in)

Preserved operations
- Stations: 3
- Length: 18 km (11 mi)

Commercial history
- Opened: 31 May 1889
- Closed: 28 May 1989

Preservation history
- 1992: Founded
- 1998: Services to Snowy Junction commenced
- 1999: Services to Chakola commenced
- Headquarters: Cooma

Website
- www.cmrailway.org.au

The Cooma Monaro Railway (CMR) is a heritage railway museum in Cooma, New South Wales, Australia. It is based at Cooma railway station on the Bombala line. It previously operated services on an 18-kilometre (11 mi) section of the line.

== History ==
Regular services on the Bombala line ceased south of Queanbeyan with the withdrawal of the Canberra Monaro Express in September 1988. Following a bridge carrying the line over the Numeralla River at Chakola being declared unsafe, freight services south of Queanbeyan ceased in May 1989. However a steam special did operate through to Cooma a few weeks later, albeit without passengers over the bridge in question.

In 1992, the Cooma Monaro Railway was formed with the aim of establishing a tourist railway. It set about negotiating a lease on the Bombala line from Cooma to Chakola with the State Rail Authority. In 1994, it purchased three CPH railmotors and an accompanying trailer from the Mountain High Railway, Tumut, and restoration at the former locomotive shed at Cooma commenced. After the line and railmotors were refurbished, northbound operations commenced on 5 December 1998 on a three-kilometre (1.9 mi) section between Cooma station and Snowy Junction opposite Cooma Racecourse. In June 1999, the line was opened to Chakola, 18 kilometres (11 mi) from Cooma.

Trains ceased operating in January 2014, with major repairs required to the line.

In December 2022, the museum officially reopened, showcasing a "Travel for Pleasure" exhibit, showcasing the past history of the line. In May 2024, maintenance vehicles resumed operating to Snowy Junction as a precursor to passenger operations resuming.

== Rolling Stock ==
=== Current ===
- 3203 restored by Transport Heritage NSW at Broadmeadow Locomotive Depot: Static display, restored arrived May 2023
- CPH railmotor 6: In storage, awaiting restoration
- CPH railmotor 8: In storage, awaiting restoration
- CPH railmotor 22: Under restoration, operational
- CTC railmotor 55: In storage, awaiting restoration
- FP paybus FP11: Under restoration, operational
- S-Truck wagons: Static display
- L-Truck wagons: Static display
- MBC22959, timber bodied refrigerated bogie box van: Static display, restored
- MB 22493, Steel framed MB timber box van :Static display, under restoration
- PV 22318 Powder van: Static display, restored
- L759 four-wheel riveted oil tanker: Static display, awaiting restorationiting restoration
- 40ft Bogie flat wagon, to be used for track maintenance, under restoration.
- MHG Guards van: To be used for track maintenance, under restoration.

=== Former ===
- 620/720 class railcars 625/725 and 631/731
