= Monaro (New South Wales) =

- Region
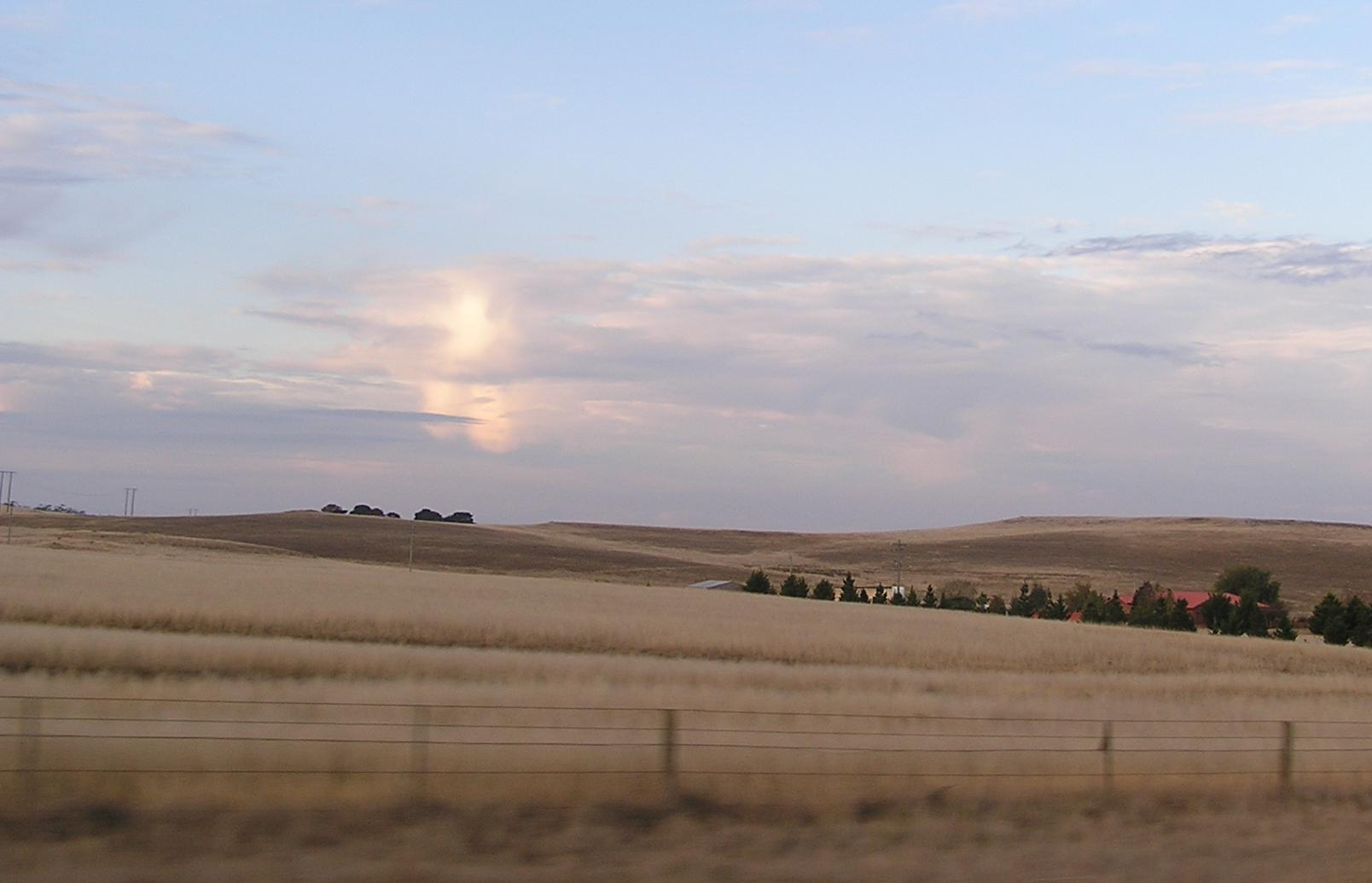
- Monaro region: between Adaminaby and Cooma.
- Country: Australia
- State: New South Wales
- LGA: Snowy Monaro

Government
  - State electorates: Monaro; Bega
  - Federal division: Eden-Monaro
Regions around Monaro
South West Slopes	Southern Tablelands	South Coast
Snowy Mountains	Monaro	South Coast
Riverina	Victorian Alps	South Coast

Monaro (/məˈnɛəroʊ/ mə-NAIR-oh), once frequently spelt "Manaro", or in early years of settlement "Maneroo" (an interpretation of an Aboriginal word for big plain,) is a region in the south of New South Wales, Australia. A small area of Victoria near Snowy River National Park is geographically part of the Monaro. While the Australian Capital Territory is not considered part of the region, some towns in the Monaro have close links with Canberra.

The Snowy Monaro Regional Council was established in 2016 which comprises the former Bombala, Cooma-Monaro and Snowy River Local Government Areas. The area is the traditional lands of the Ngarigo people, who continue to survive despite the events of genocide in the 1800s. The Ngarigo share their northern border with the Ngunnawal people. It has snowfields, expansive timber forests and the Snowy River.

Holden's 'Monaro' Coupe (and later sedan) models (1967–1977, 2001–2006, 1973–1974 (Sedan)) were named after the area (but pronounced /məˈnɑːroʊ/ mə-NAH-roh).

== Geography ==
The Monaro region, a plateau area lying about 1,000 metres above sea level, extends from the valley of the Murrumbidgee River in the north to the Errinundra Plateau in the south. It drops rather sharply to the coast on its eastern side. Much of the region is an ancient highland, but there is basaltic bedrock near Cooma and Nimmitabel that produce the only true chernozems in the whole continent, which are some of the best soils in Australia. Elsewhere the granitic soils are heavily leached and very infertile, supporting a dry forest vegetation before clearing for pastures. The Southern Tablelands Temperate Grassland is a vegetation community that lies in the region.

The Monaro region is characterised by rolling hills that rise to extremely rugged peaks in the Tinderry Mountains and to shallow valleys in the upper Murrumbidgee. The basaltic Monaro Range separates the Snowy and Murrumbidgee drainages. Because the climate in the basaltic areas is too cold for really reliable cropping (Nimmitabel has had frosts in January), the main industry is raising sheep and beef cattle.

== Climate ==
Because it is located east of the Snowy Mountains, the rain-bearing westerly winds deposit rain and snow on the mountains leaving the Monaro region in a rain shadow (see southeast Australian foehn). Annual rainfall ranges from 430 millimetres (17 inches) around Dalgety to 700 millimetres (26 inches) at the eastern edge of the plateau, where occasional cyclonic storms can produce extremely heavy rainfall - in one day in June 1975 Nimmitabel received 256 millimetres (over 10 inches) of rain.

Temperatures in summer are warm to very warm, with average maxima ranging from 28 °C (82 °F) around Canberra and Queanbeyan to 22 °C (71 °F) on the highest parts of the plateau. Nights in summer can be cool, but in winter the region is the coldest part of mainland Australia outside the Alps, with July minima averaging -0.3 °C (31.5 °F) in Canberra and -1.5 °C (29.3 °F) in Bombala.

== Transport ==
The Monaro Highway is the main state highway which runs from Canberra south through the Monaro region. Other major roads in the region are the Snowy Mountains Highway which crosses the Monaro between Tumut and Bega, the Kosciuszko Road from Cooma to Jindabyne, and the Snowy River Way from Bombala to Jindabyne.Cooma–Snowy Mountains Airport is the only airport in the region with only limited air services. However, most residents in the region would also use Canberra Airport, Merimbula Airport, and Moruya Airport for air travel.

== Media ==
Radio stations that broadcast to the region are:

- ABC South East NSW (part of ABC Local Radio)
- ABC Radio Canberra can also be received in the region (part of ABC Local Radio)
- Snow FM serving Cooma, Jindabyne and Snowy Mountains (commercial)
- XLFM serving Cooma (community)
- Monaro FM serving the whole region (community)

The region receives five free-to-air television networks including all the digital free-to-air channels relayed from Canberra.

Networks available include ABC, SBS, Seven, WIN, and Network 10.

== Towns ==
The main towns in the region are Cooma, Jindabyne, Berridale and Bombala, whilst other towns and villages include Adaminaby, Delegate, Dalgety, Nimmitabel, Bredbo, Michelago, Maffra, Numeralla, and Cathcart. Larger localities within the Monaro include Shannons Flat, Yaouk, Eucumbene, Bunyan, Jerangle, Countegany and Kybeyan.
