= Dangelong =

- Town
- Coordinates: 36°21′01″S 149°17′31.7″E
- Country: Australia
- State: New South Wales
- Region: Southern Tablelands
- LGA: Snowy Monaro Regional Council
- Location: 25 km (16 mi) SE of Cooma; 142 km (88 mi) S of Canberra

Government
  - State electorate: Monaro
  - Federal division: Eden-Monaro

Population
  - Total: 0 (2021 census)
- Postcode: 2630
- County: Beresford
- Parish: Dangelong, Palmerston
Localities around Dangelong
| Cooma | Carlaminda | Tuross |
| Rock Flat | Dangelong | Kybeyan |
| Springfield | Nimmitabel | Kybeyan |

Dangelong is a rural locality in the Snowy Monaro Regional Council local government area of New South Wales, Australia. It is located south-east of Cooma. It had no people or a very low population recorded at the 2021 census.

The eastern boundary of the locality is formed by the Numeralla River, and the confluence of that river with its tributary, Dangelong Creek lies in the locality.

The area now known as Dangelong lies on the traditional lands of Ngarigo people. The name, Dangelong, is probably derived from an Aboriginal word, as rendered by colonial settlers, that was applied to an early squatting run in the area.

John Mackenzie established 'Dangelong' station, a vast squatting run of 44 square miles (11,396 hectares), when he occupied land taken from Ngarigo people, as a squatter. He began a grazing operation at Dangelong, which had twenty-six residents and ten slab huts, by 1839. He chose to reside, with his family, on other land that he owned at Nerriga. One of Mackenzies's sons—probably his eldest son, Andrew—managed 'Dangelong', during the time that it was controlled by Mackenzie. In 1848, as a result of Mackenzie's insolvency and subsequent bankruptcy, the 'Dangelong' run leasehold, by then of 15,000 acres, passed to another early landholder, William Bradley. The station was later part of the extensive Monaro landholdings of the Wallace family.

During the 1870s, the squatter run was opened to selection, resulting in its subdivision into smaller properties, although the 'Dandelong' station still existed and retained some of the land.

The area once had more residents and farm dwellings, and its residents made use of the nearest (former) settlement at Rock Flat. There was a school at Dangelong for most of the interval from May 1873 to December 1918.

There was some small scale mining of reef gold, just outside the eastern boundary of the modern-day locality, during the late 19th century.

The area is mainly cleared for grazing, with some forested land on the higher ground along its eastern side. The Dangelong station homestead buildings, dating from the 1860s, are still in use.
