= Coolringdon =

- Town
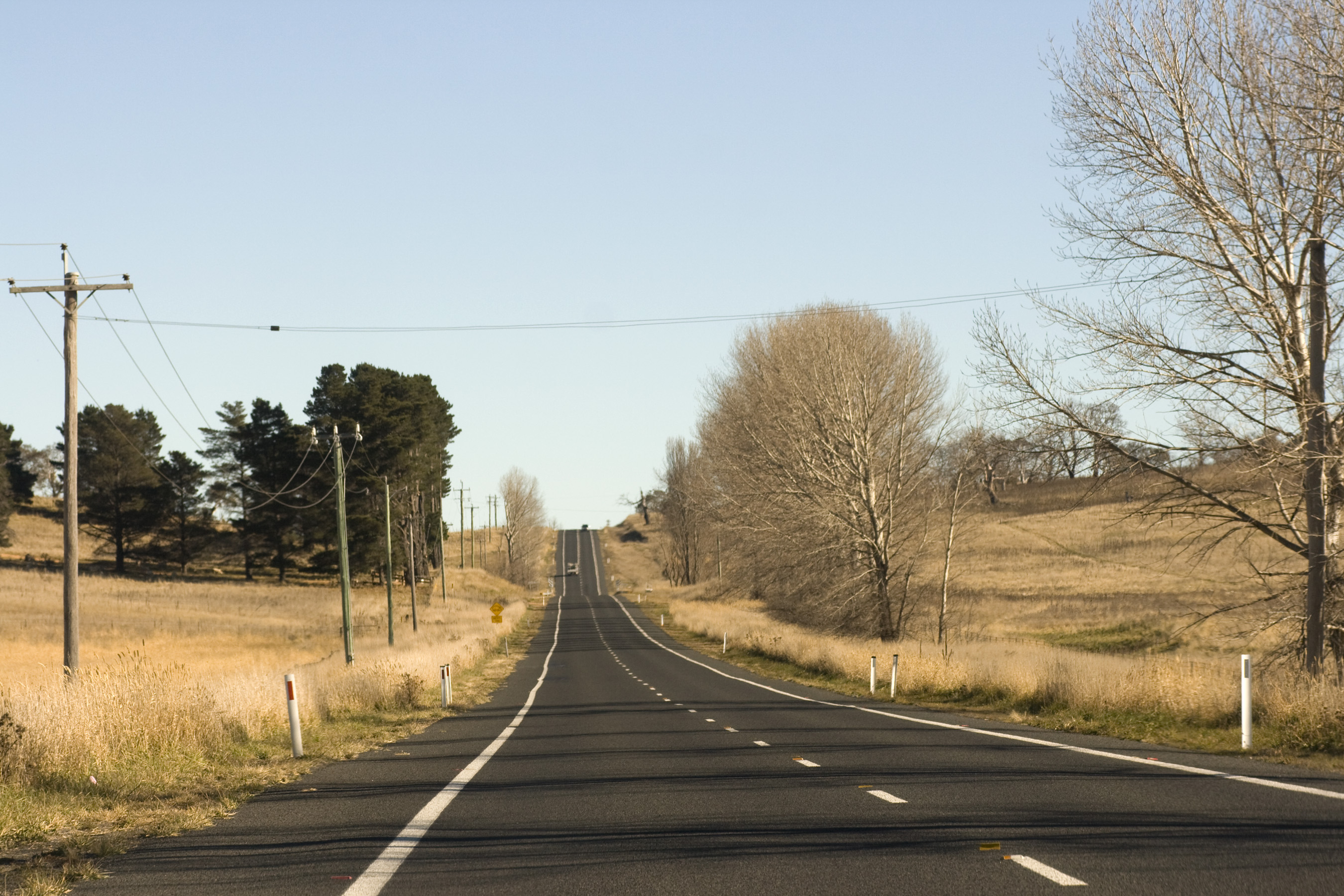
- Kosciuszko Road, Coolringdon

- Interactive map of Coolringdon
- Coordinates: 36°15′03″S 149°00′55″E
- Country: Australia
- State: New South Wales
- Region: Southern Tablelands
- LGA: Snowy Monaro Regional Council
- Location: 12 km (7.5 mi) W of Cooma; 124 km (77 mi) S of Canberra

Government
  - State electorate: Monaro
  - Federal division: Eden-Monaro

Population
  - Total: 73 (2021 census)
- Postcode: 2630
- County: Beresford
- Parish: Coolringdon
Localities around Coolringdon
Rhine Falls	Wambrook	Dairymans Plains
Middlingbank	Coolringdon	Pine Valley
Berridale	Arable	Rock Flat

Coolringdon is a locality in the Local Government Area of the Snowy Monaro Regional Council, in the Monaro region of New South Wales, Australia. It lies in the foothills of the Snowy Mountains, west of Cooma. At the 2021 census, there were 73 people usually residing in Coolringdon. The Cooma-Snowy Mountains Airport is located within the locality. Coolringdon is notable as being one of the proposed sites for Australia's national capital, prior to the selection of Canberra.

== History ==
The area now known as Coolringdon lies on the traditional lands of the Ngarigo people. Called 'Coolerandong' by early colonial settlers, it is likely that the name of Coolringdon is derived from an Aboriginal language word that has been anglicised.

The area lay outside the Nineteen Counties, and settlers had no legal right—even under colonial law—to occupy land there, until 1836, after which grazing rights could be obtained by payment of a licence fee.

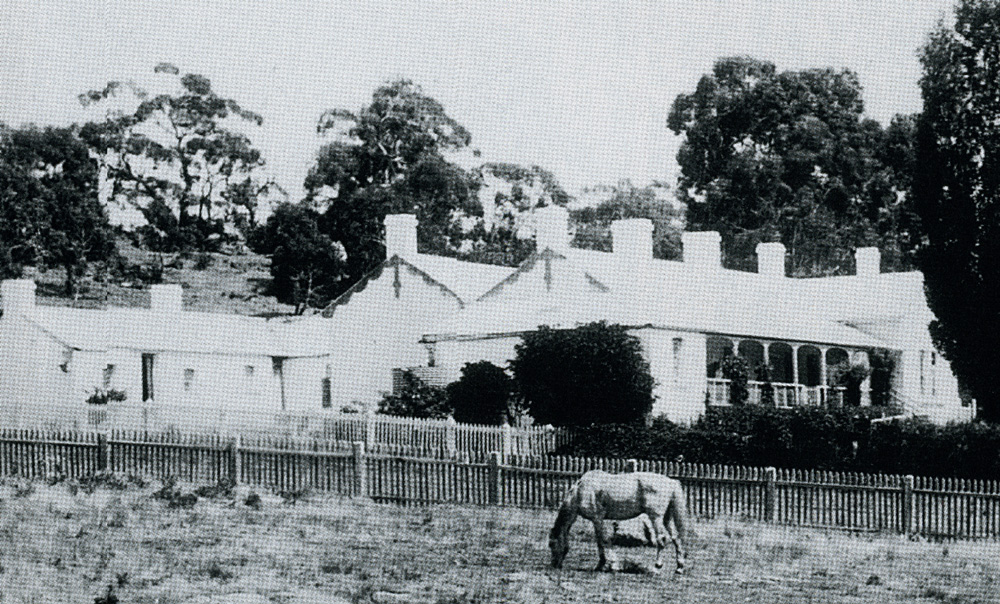
Coolrington Homestead c.1900

The locality takes its name from a sheep station of the same name, which dates from 1829, and was one of the earliest colonial settlements in the Monaro. It was taken up as a squatting run by Stewart Ryrie, Deputy Commissary General of N.S.W. and patriarch of the Ryrie family of colonial settlers. By 1845, it was being managed by Stewart Ryrie's son, Stewart Ryrie Jr, on behalf of its new owner, Dr Francis Lascelles Wallace, Stewart Ryrie's son-in-law.

Later, it was a part of the extensive landholdings of William Bradley, and then once again returned to the Wallace family, the three nephews of Dr. F. L. Wallace.

It is now owned and managed, by the John and Betty Casey Research Trust, as a working farm promoting best practice primary production and land management, and to preserve the historic homestead and garden.

A public school was established in 1879 and operated until 1918.

== Attractions ==
The well preserved Coolringdon Homestead is over 190 years old and is renowned for its heritage garden and school house.

The Snowy River Sphere, a sculpture by artist Richard Moffatt, is made from steel beams left over from construction of the Skitube railway and inspired by the rivers, ski runs and indigenous pathways of the region. It was commissioned by the Snowy River Shire Council to mark the gateway to the region and installed at Coolringdon beside the Kosciuszko Road in 2011.
