= Dry Plain =

- Town
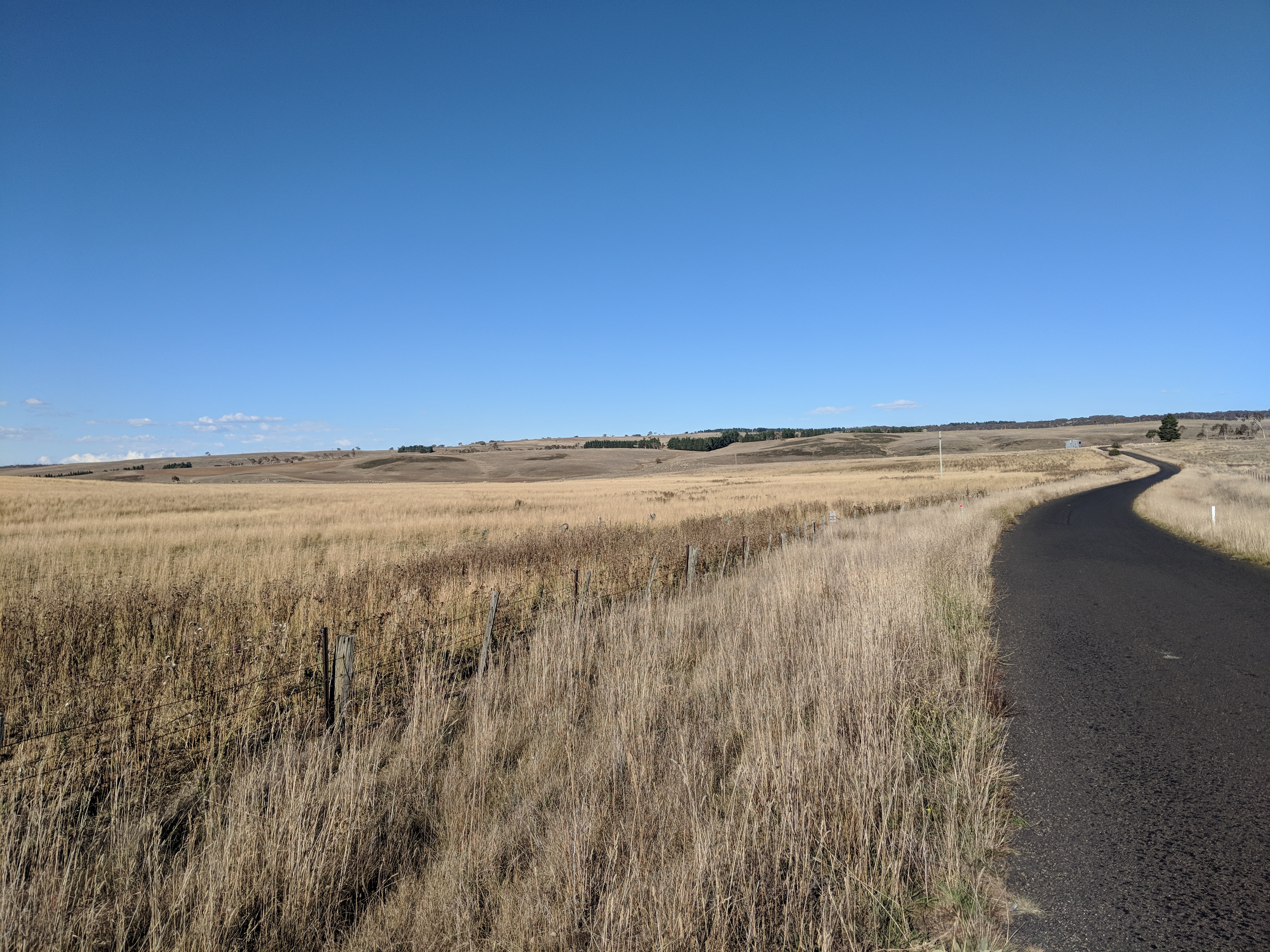

- Coordinates: 36°04′57″S 148°56′02″E
- Country: Australia
- State: New South Wales
- Region: Monaro
- LGA: Snowy Monaro Regional Council
- Location: 24 km (15 mi) SE of Adaminaby; 160 km (99 mi) S of Canberra; 40 km (25 mi) NW of Cooma; 406 km (252 mi) SW of Sydney

Government
  - State electorate: Monaro
  - Federal division: Eden-Monaro
- Elevation: 1,260 m (4,130 ft)

Population
  - Total: 42 (2021 census)
- Postcode: 2630
- County: Wallace
- Parish: Backalum
Localities around Dry Plain
Bolaro	Shannons Flat	Shannons Flat
Adaminaby	Dry Plain	Murrumbucca
Frying Pan	Rhine Falls	Wambrook

Dry Plain is a locality in the Snowy Monaro Region, New South Wales, Australia. It is located in grasslands mainly to the east of the Snowy Mountains Highway, about 25 km southeast of Adaminaby and 40 km northwest of Cooma, at an altitude of approximately 1,260 metres (4,130 ft). It is about 160 km south of Canberra. At the 2021 census, it had a population of 42.

It had a school from June 1925 to October 1927, generally described as a "half-time" school.
