= Springfield, Australia =

Springfield, Australia, may refer to the following places:

- Springfield, New South Wales (Central Coast), a suburb of Central Coast
- Springfield, New South Wales (Snowy Monaro Regional Council), a locality in the Snowy Monaro region
- Springfield, Queensland, a planned city near Ipswich
- Springfield, South Australia, a suburb of Adelaide
- Springfield, Victoria (Shire of Buloke), a locality in the Shire of Buloke
- Springfield, Victoria (Macedon Ranges), a locality in the Shire of Macedon Ranges
- West Moonah, Tasmania was known as Springfield from 1917 until the 1960s
- Springfield, Tasmania (Dorset Council) a locality near Scottsdale in the northeast of Tasmania

== See also ==
- Springfield (disambiguation)
