= Rock Flat Creek =

Rock Flat Creek Flat, Tolbar
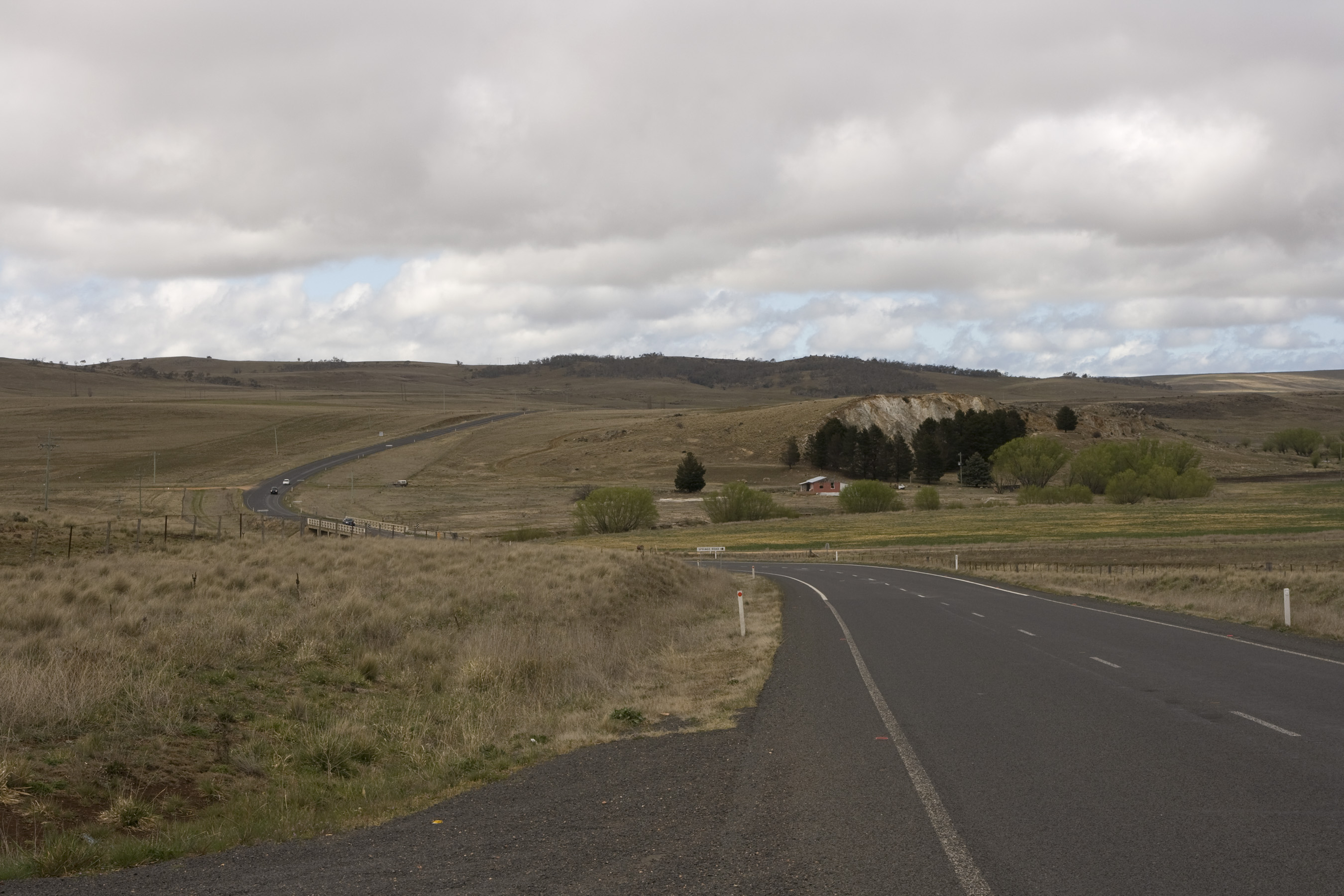
- Monaro Highway crossing Rock Flat Creek.

- Location of the Rock Flat Creek mouth in New South Wales

Location
- Country: Australia
- State: New South Wales
- Region: Snowy Mountains (IBRA), Monaro
- LGA: Snowy Monaro

Physical characteristics
- Source: Australian Alps, Great Dividing Range
  - location: below One Tree Hill
  - coordinates: 36°26′5″S 149°13′10″E
  - elevation: 1,060 m (3,480 ft)
- Mouth: confluence with the Cooma Creek
  - location: north of Cooma
  - coordinates: 36°7′27″S 149°11′21″E
  - elevation: 719 m (2,359 ft)
- Length: 41 km (25 mi)

Basin features
- River system: Murrumbidgee catchment, Murray–Darling basin

Rock Flat Creek is a watercourse that is part of the Murrumbidgee catchment within the Murray–Darling basin. It is located in the Monaro region of New South Wales, Australia.

== Course and features ==
Rock Flat Creek (technically a river) rises below One Tree Hill, on the lower slopes of the Snowy Mountains, part of the Great Dividing Range. The creek flows generally north by west before reaching its confluence its tributary, Cooma Creek, and then flows into Numeralla River (itself a tributary of the Murrumbidgee River), north of the town of Cooma. The creek descends 336 metres (1,102 ft) over its 41-kilometre (25 mi) course.

The Monaro Highway crosses the creek near the locality of Milton Park.

== Mineral spring ==
Near the Monaro Highway crossing, there is a mineral spring that comes to the surface, on the bank of Rock Flat Creek, about 16 km south-east of Cooma. The spring water issues from near the base of a small rocky mount composed of highly inclined beds of quartzite and the surface of the flat in the vicinity of the spring is tufaceous limestone that has been deposited there by the spring water. The flow rate of the spring is about 245-litres per hour. The spring water has a pleasant taste and is carbonated.

An analysis of the spring water, c.1900, in units of grains per imperial gallon, revealed its mineral content as follows

Mineral content of spring at Rock Flat
Chemical compound	Grains per gallon	Milligrams per litre
Sodium Chloride	2.51	35.78
Calcium Carbonate	56.08	799.35
Sodium Carbonate	70.50	1004.89
Lithium Carbonate	2.50	35.63
Magnesium Carbonate	24.61	350.78
Silica	1.00	14.25

== See also ==
- List of rivers of New South Wales (L-Z)
- Rivers of New South Wales
- Rock Flat, New South Wales (concerning the history of the mineral spring)
