= Rock Bolting Development Site =

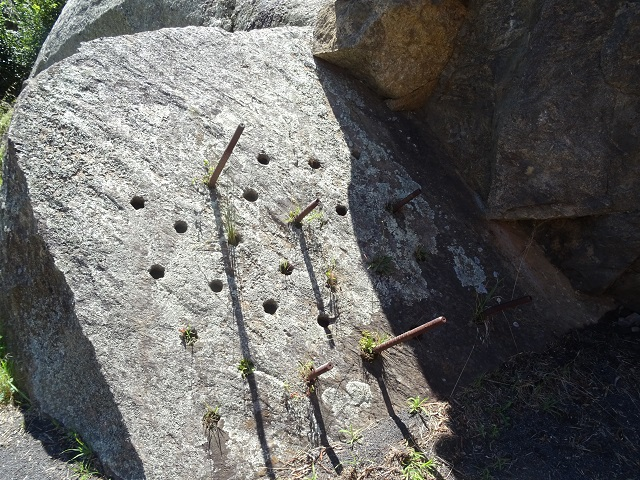

- Location within New South Wales Location within Australia
- 36.2411°S 149.1168°E
- Location: Sharp Street, Cooma, Snowy Monaro Regional Council, New South Wales, Australia

History
- Built: 1956–1962

Site notes
- Architect: Snowy Mountains Hydro-Electric Authority Personnel
- Owner: Department of Trade & Investment – Crown Lands

New South Wales Heritage Register
- Official name: Rock Bolting Development Site; Cooma Back Creek; Scientific Services Division; SMHEA
- Type: state heritage (built)
- Designated: 23 December 2016
- Reference no.: 1984
- Type: Other – Scientific Facilities
- Category: Scientific Facilities
- Builders: Snowy Mountains Hydro-Electric Authority personnel

Rock Bolting Development Site is a heritage-listed former rock bolt experiment site at Sharp Street, Cooma, Snowy Monaro Regional Council, New South Wales, Australia. It was used by Snowy Mountains Hydro-Electric Authority personnel from 1956 to 1962. It was added to the New South Wales State Heritage Register on 23 December 2016.

== History ==
From the mid-1950s through to the early 1960s the Snowy Mountains Hydro-Electric Authority (SMHEA) developed a method to prevent large tunnels and caverns from collapse through the use of patterned rock bolting, with bolt placement designed according to the rock structure. The methodology was shared internationally and was adopted worldwide; it and the hardware remain essentially the same as those developed by the Snowy Mountains Authority.

The Cooma Rock Bolting Development Site was within the property of the Authority's Scientific Services Laboratory where laboratory testing of the rock bolting methodology was performed and developed. The site in Lambie Gorge is where "pull-out" tests were undertaken to prove a rock-bolt anchorage that was as strong as the bolt itself. The site, which is accessible to the public, displays drilled holes and remnant rock bolts in the rock faces where the testing was performed.

Many people were engaged within several engineering laboratories of the SMHEA, the civil design office and at the underground construction sites themselves for the massive Snowy Mountains Hydro-Electric Scheme. In addition, efficient installation techniques were devised to maximise the effectiveness of rock bolting for all its benefits to a project. The work in the gorge on successive occasions led to the approval for the commercial supply for rock bolting components under a series of underground construction contracts for the Scheme.

Permanency of the rock bolting design was crucial to its full development and acceptance. This came from sealing the whole bolt system and by transferring the tensile force from bolts positioned in a pattern across the full span into a lasting compression and locking force. This aspect of the development was proven in the laboratories and refined under contract conditions at the construction sites.

The Cooma Rock Bolting Development Site represents a suitable location for recognising the development of pattern rock-bolting and its contribution to the engineering discipline of rock mechanics. It was a SMHEA team effort led by engineering management that delivered very significant achievements in tunnelling speeds that regularly set new world records together with very large savings in construction costs and improved construction worker safety; it also engendered enthusiasm and pride in the project work of the Authority.

The Rock Bolting Development Site was declared a National Engineering Heritage Landmark by Engineers Australia on 18 October 2009 when a plaque and interpretive sign were unveiled at the site. The Landmark is the highest level of heritage recognition accorded by Engineers Australia. The event was timed to coincide with the celebration of the 60th anniversary of the Snowy Mountains Scheme.

Rock Bolting - the detailed description and justification

Rock bolting in hard rock involves drilling a hole into sound rock at the excavated face (commonly between 1.50m and 6.00m deep depending on the conditions and rock structure), with a diameter to suit an expansion unit anchor - often about 45 mm diameter. A steel rod - the bolt, is then inserted with an expansion unit at the embedded end. At its exposed end the bolt is threaded and fitted with a nut under which is a small steel plate that bears on a conical rubber seal to seal the hole entrance when grouting is taking place. Screwing the nut down onto the plate and thus the rock surface, causes the embedded expansion unit to expand and anchor the bolt in the hole, this in turn allows a predetermined tension to be applied to the bolt. The aim is to have the anchor hold the full elastic tensile strength of the bolt. The hole surrounding the bolt is then filled with non-shrinking grout in a way that displaces the air. When the grout sets, it forms a permanent bond between the bolt and the surrounding rock.

When the bolt is tensioned by the nut against the plate at the surface, the compressive and transverse forces lock the layer of rock against further movement. The forces induced by tensioning the bolts create a pre-stressed membrane across the surface of the excavated rock face which neutralises the internal forces in the rock.

The use of non-shrinking grout enables the bolt components to transfer load to the adjacent rock over its whole length, as well as providing an inhibiting environment against corrosion. The formula for the non-shrinking grout which exactly compensates for the shrinkage of normal grout, was in itself, an inspired innovation by engineers of the SMHEA Scientific Services Laboratories.

Pull-out tests were conducted at the Rock Bolting Development Site to obtain data that would show the anchorage strength compared to the strength of the bolt. A dozen or so rock bolts at the site were used to prove the effectiveness of the grouting and the strength of the anchorage.

Many other steps were taken in the scientific laboratories of SMHEA to make an integrated, fully developed rock bolt reinforcement system that remained as a permanent structure, protected from corrosion.

In most instances rock bolting can replace the need for surface steel supports and the accompanying over-excavation to accommodate them, and it can avoid the need for separate concrete support of underground excavations.

It has been estimated that rock bolting reduced the steel required for support to one eighth of that required using conventional methods. It also saved the cost of over-excavation (and removal of the additional excavated rock) to accommodate supports and/or lining. Contractual pricing at the time showed a 45% increase in cost for fully concrete lined tunnels where light steel external supports were used instead of rock bolts. While much time and labour were saved by these excavation benefits, they also enhanced tunnelling safety. It was also an additional time-saver in that the rock bolts needed to be installed immediately after each advance of the tunnel excavation and simultaneously with the next face drilling and face exposure, before the laying of explosive charges in these holes.

Location of the Rock Bolting Development Site

The Rock Bolting Development Site on Cooma Back Creek in Lambie Gorge was deliberately chosen for geological reasons because the mineralogical composition of the Cooma gneiss was similar to the granite in the known construction sites in the Snowy Mountains. These sites were for the underground hydro-electric power stations, Tumut 1 and Tumut 2 and their associated tunnels.

The other factor giving rise to the usefulness of the Rock Bolting Development Site was that it was near the Engineering Laboratories of Scientific Services Division of SMHEA. These laboratories were where the testing personnel worked with their testing apparatus, both fixed and portable. All this land was then under the ownership of SMHEA and had been in use for six years in connection with other experimental work associated with the laboratories. The original SMHEA building for Engineering Materials and the storage buildings still stand (at 2016). In the years of testing activity a foot bridge at the height of the flood plain allowed for the crossing of Cooma Back Creek to the Rock Bolting Development Site from the laboratories.

== Description ==
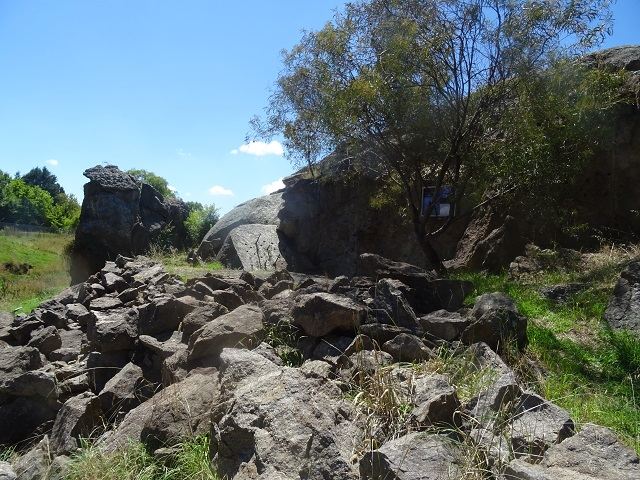
The Rock Bolting Development site

The Rock Bolting Development Site is located on a bank of Lambie Gorge through which Cooma Back Creek flows. The site is accessed from Sharp Street (Snowy Mountains Highway) in central Cooma, near the Park commemorating the "Southern Cloud" airliner, by a Public Reserve pathway along the bank of the Cooma Back Creek, via the Cooma Agricultural and Pastoral Society Showgrounds and the Cooma Bowling Club.

The site comprises a natural rock face into which holes have been drilled. Bolts of various designs project from some of these holes. Blasted fallen rock in front of the main test area is evidence of a succession of test faces within the span of usage of the test site.

There are two main areas where the rock bolting experimental tests were conducted. A succession of tests were conducted in the area at the downstream end of the gorge.

As at 4 December 2013, the holes and bolts were reported to be in excellent condition as they had not been disturbed. The broken rock and bolts from previous experiments are still in place.

The site retains many of the bolts and drilled holes of the original field tests.

A succession of test faces is evident by the blasted fallen rock in front of the main test area. This was undertaken within the span of the testing at the site.

== Heritage listing ==
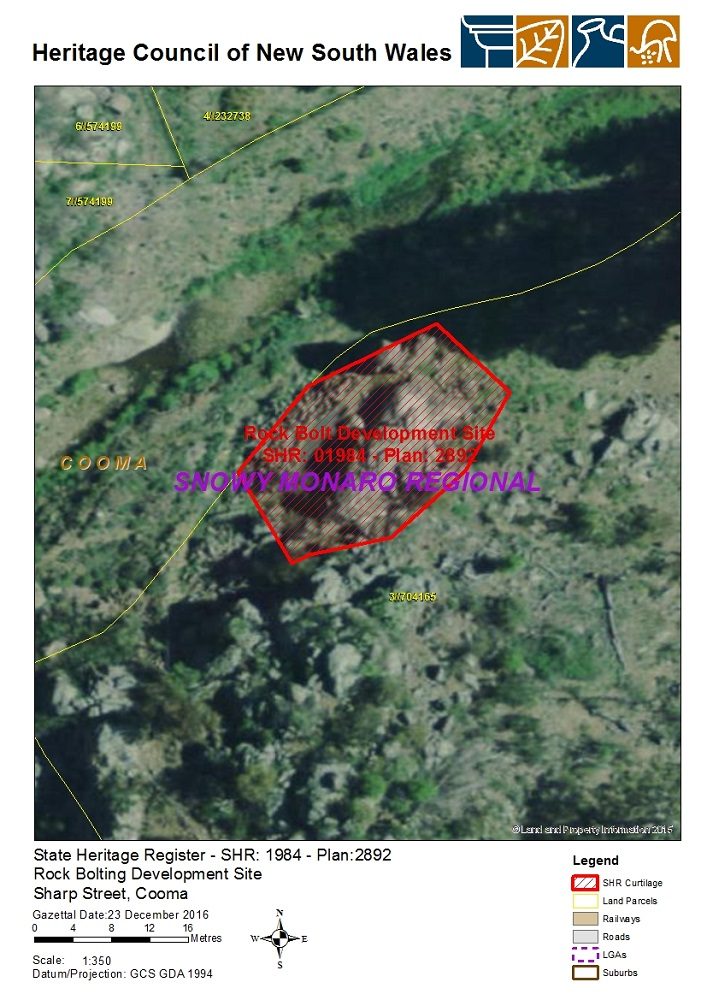
Heritage boundaries

The Rock Bolting Development Site is of state heritage significance as the location of field testing of a pioneering Australian methodology for the permanent support of underground excavations in hard rock, using patterned rock bolting. The practice made tunneling safer, faster, and less expensive than earlier methods and quickly spread worldwide; it continues with little change today.

The drilled holes and remnant rock bolts exposed in the rock faces of Lambie Gorge are evidence of where "pull-out" tests were undertaken to prove a rock-bolt anchorage that was as strong as the bolt itself.

Rock bolts had been used in coal mines from 1912 primarily to attach loose slabs to more stable rock layers, and their use began in hard rock in Sweden in 1939.

However, the approach was empirical without theoretical guidance or the backing of laboratory experiments. The methodology for the permanent support of underground excavations in hard rock was developed by the Snowy Mountains Hydro-Electric Authority between the mid-1950s and the early 1960s, through design research, coupled with testing, measurement and trials.

Rock Bolting Development Site was listed on the New South Wales State Heritage Register on 23 December 2016 having satisfied the following criteria.

The place is important in demonstrating the course, or pattern, of cultural or natural history in New South Wales.

The Rock Bolting Development site is of state heritage significance for its role in the history and development of the applied science of rock mechanics in NSW, Australia and internationally. It was the site at which a quantum leap in knowledge, methods and techniques of rock excavation and tunnelling were developed in the 1950s and 1960s. The new methodology led to a significant reduction in the cost of rock excavation and tunnelling, vast improvements in safety of workers and increased speed at which rock tunnelling projects could be completed.

The place has a strong or special association with a person, or group of persons, of importance of cultural or natural history of New South Wales's history.

The Rock Bolting Development site is of state heritage significance for its strong association with the widely acclaimed Snowy Mountains Hydro-Electric Authority and its expert professional staff. The new methodology had significant associations with major tunnelling contractors.

The place is important in demonstrating aesthetic characteristics and/or a high degree of creative or technical achievement in New South Wales.

The Rock Bolting Development site is of state significance for its aesthetic and technical values in NSW. The aesthetically distinctive rock face and scattered remnant shards are a strong visual representation of the creative and lateral thinking leading to the ground-breaking research in the science of rock mechanics.

The place has a strong or special association with a particular community or cultural group in New South Wales for social, cultural or spiritual reasons.

Regarded as the most significant engineering development made on the Snowy Scheme, the Rock Bolting Development site is of state significance as it is held in high esteem by the engineering fraternity in NSW and Australia.

The place has potential to yield information that will contribute to an understanding of the cultural or natural history of New South Wales.

The Rock Bolting Development site, with its still evident bolts and bore sites and the rock shards dislodged during experiments, is of state heritage significance for its potential to demonstrate the process of developing the rock bolting techniques in NSW. The site can also demonstrate the precedence of the work of the Snowy Mountains Hydro-Electric Authority and its impact in the engineering fraternity worldwide.

The place possesses uncommon, rare or endangered aspects of the cultural or natural history of New South Wales.

The Rock Bolting Development site is of state heritage significance as it is the only site where such activity was undertaken in Australia.

The place is important in demonstrating the principal characteristics of a class of cultural or natural places/environments in New South Wales.

The Rock Bolting Development site is of state heritage significance as a representative location for engineering experimentation that contributed significantly to the development of engineering science in NSW, Australia and the world.
