= Wambrook, New South Wales =

Wambrook
- Town
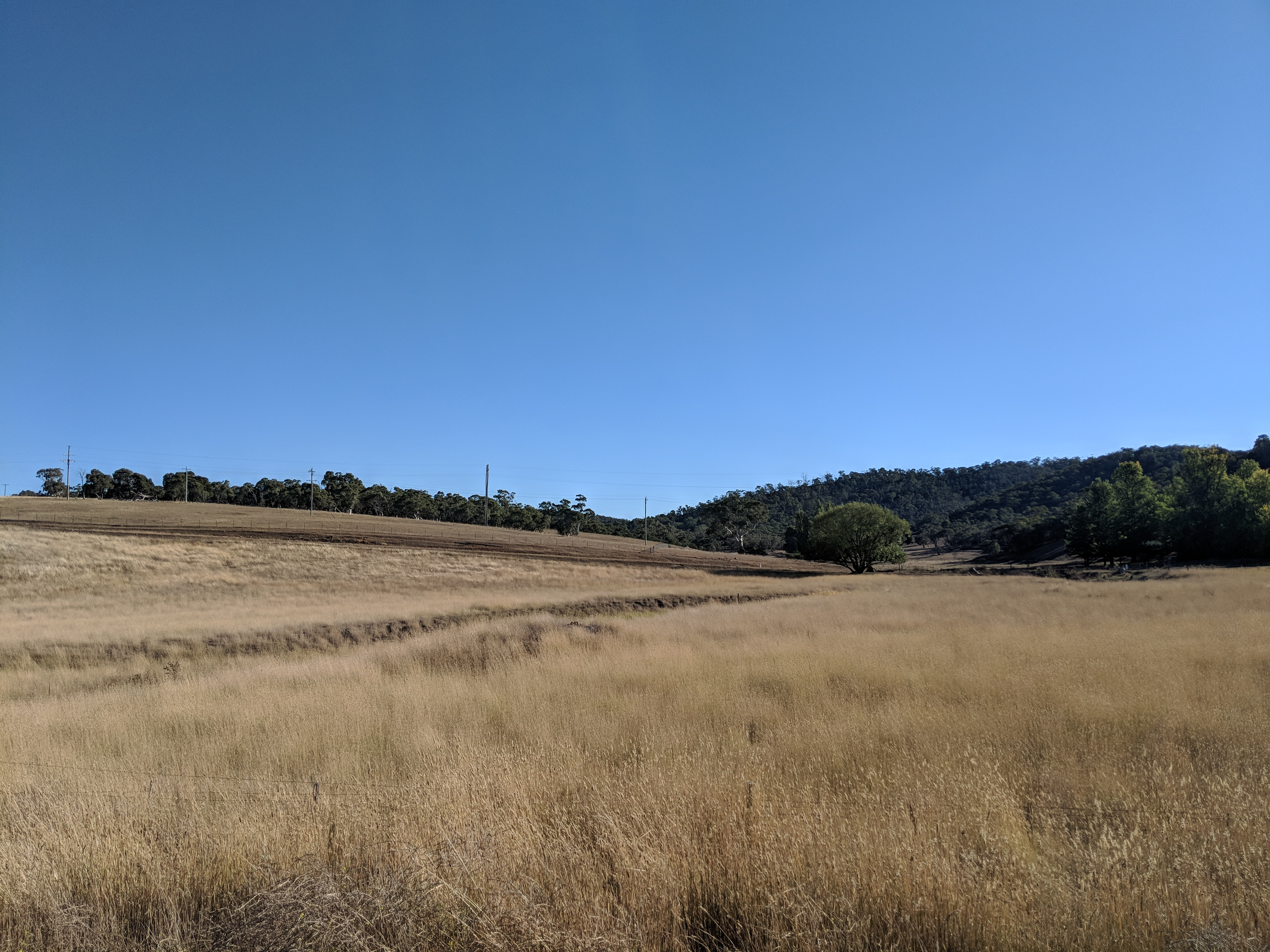

- Coordinates: 36°12′37″S 148°57′02″E
- Country: Australia
- State: New South Wales
- Region: Monaro
- LGA: Snowy Monaro Regional Council
- Location: 28 km (17 mi) SE of Adaminaby; 140 km (87 mi) S of Canberra; 22 km (14 mi) NW of Cooma

Government
  - State electorate: Monaro
  - Federal division: Eden-Monaro
- Elevation: 865 m (2,838 ft)

Population
  - Total: 44 (2016 census)
- Postcode: 2630
- County: Wallace
- Parish: Wambrook
Localities around Wambrook
Dry Plain	Murrumbucca	Murrumbucca
Rhine Falls	Wambrook	Dairymans Plains
Cootralantra	Coolringdon	Dairymans Plains

Wambrook is a locality in the Snowy Monaro Region, New South Wales, Australia. It is located in grasslands mainly to the northeast of the Snowy Mountains Highway, about 30 km southeast of Adaminaby and 25 km northwest of Cooma, situated at the foot of the ranges at an altitude of 865 m above mean sea level. It is about 140 km south of Canberra. At the 2016 census, it had a population of 44.

It had a school from 1892 to 1903 and from 1912 to 1928, described as a "provisional" school until March 1916 and subsequently as a "half-time" school.
