= Cooma Creek =

River in New South Wales, Australia

Cooma
- Location of the Cooma Creek mouth in New South Wales

Location
- Country: Australia
- State: New South Wales
- Region: South Eastern Highlands (IBRA), Monaro
- LGA: Snowy Monaro Regional Council
- Town: Cooma

Physical characteristics
- Source: Great Dividing Range
  - location: below The Peak
  - coordinates: 36°25′21″S 149°9′10″E
  - elevation: 1,100 m (3,600 ft)
- Mouth: confluence with Rock Flat Creek
  - location: near Chakola
  - coordinates: 36°7′27″S 149°11′20″E
  - elevation: 720 m (2,360 ft)
- Length: 42 km (26 mi)

Basin features
- River system: Murrumbidgee catchment, Murray–Darling basin
- Tributaries
  - left: Brothers Creek, Cooma Back Creek
  - right: Middle Flat Creek

The Cooma Creek, a mostly–perennial river that is part of the Murrumbidgee catchment within the Murray–Darling basin, is located in the Monaro region of New South Wales, Australia.

== Course and features ==
The Cooma Creek (technically a river) rises below The Peak, southeast of Snow Hill and west southwest of Brick Kiln Hill, part of the Great Dividing Range, and flows generally north and then north by east, joined by three minor tributaries and flowing through the town of Cooma before reaching its confluence with Rock Flat Creek near the locality of Chakola. Rock Flat Creek continues to the Numeralla River, which is a tributary of the Murrumbidgee River. The Cooma Creek descends 385 metres (1,263 ft) over its 42-kilometre (26 mi) course.

The Snowy Mountains Highway crosses Cooma Creek in Cooma; and the Monaro Highway crosses Cooma Creek at Bunyan.

== See also ==
- List of rivers of New South Wales (A-K)
- Rivers of New South Wales
