= Stuart Parish (Cowper County), New South Wales =

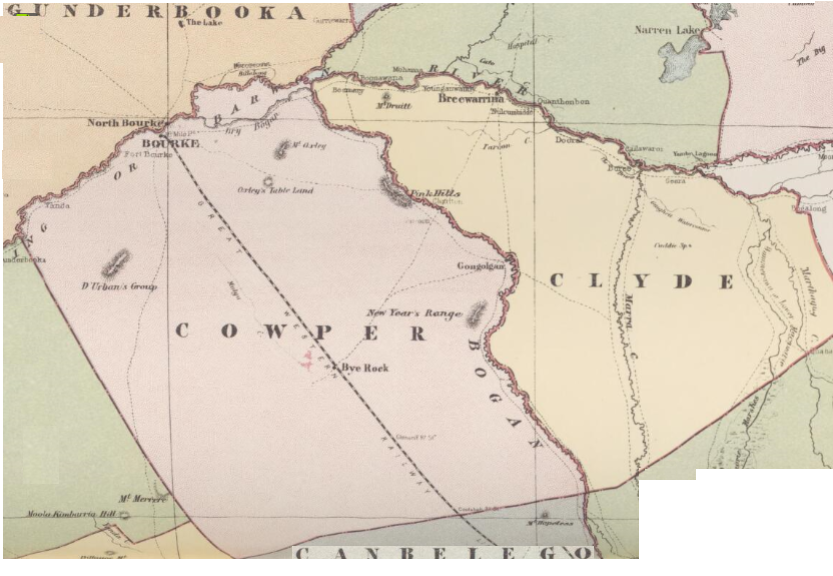
Map of Clyde and Cowper Counties 1886 by John Sands.

Stuart Parish is a Rural locality of Bogan Shire at 30°51′22″S 146°46′17″E and civil Parish of Cowper County, New South Wales.

Stuart parish has a Köppen climate classification of BSh (Hot semi arid).
