= Tubba Parish (Cowper County), New South Wales =

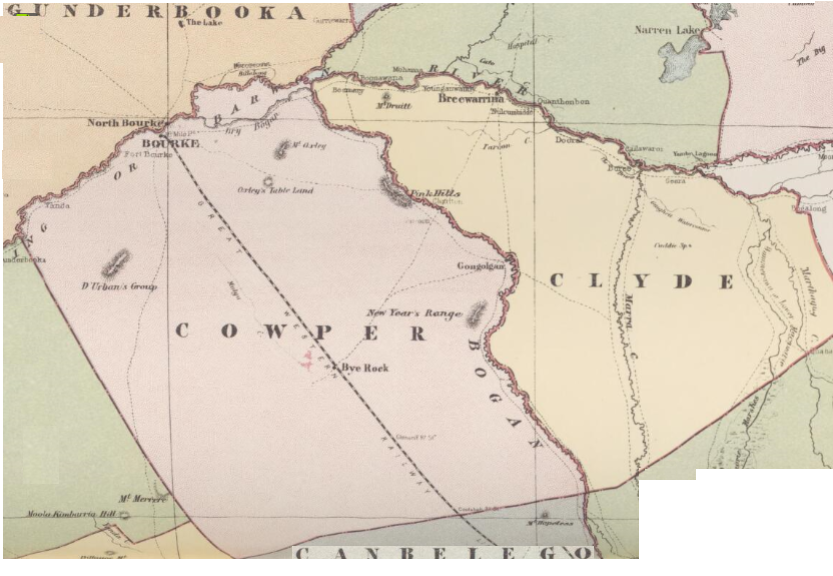
Map of Clyde and Cowper Counties 1886 by John Sands.

Mulgawarrina, New South Wales is a Bounded locality of Bogan Shire and a civil Parish of Cowper County, New South Wales, a cadasteral division of central New South Wales.

== Geography ==
The parish is on the Bogan River.

The topography of the Parish is flat. The parish has a Köppen climate classification of BSh (Hot semi arid).
