= Cowper County =

Cowper New South Wales
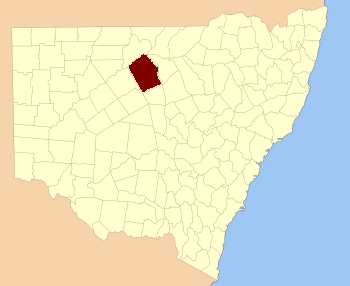
- Location in New South Wales
Lands administrative divisions around Cowper:
Gunderbooka	Gunderbooka	Clyde
Gunderbooka	Cowper	Clyde
Yanda	Robinson	Canbelego

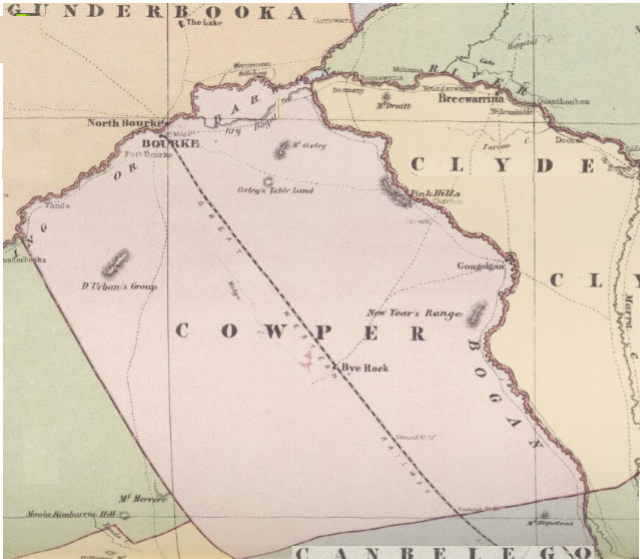
A map of Cowper County (NSW) in 1886. From John Sands Atlas of Australia.

Cowper County, New South Wales is one of the 141 cadastral divisions of New South Wales.

Cowper County is named in honour of the politician and Premier of New South Wales, Sir Charles Cowper (1807–1875).

It is located to the south-east of Bourke, with the Darling River the boundary to the northwest, and the Bogan River the boundary to the northeast.

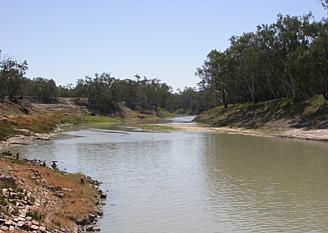
The Darling River is the boundary between Cowper and Gunderbooka.

== Parishes within this county ==
A full list of parishes found within this county; their current LGA and mapping coordinates to the approximate centre of each location is as follows:

Parish	LGA	Coordinates
Annandale	Cobar Shire	30°41′20″S 146°03′00″E
Banga	Bourke Shire	30°09′36″S 145°52′02″E
Barton	Bourke Shire	30°09′37″S 145°58′52″E
Belars	Bogan Shire	30°52′06″S 146°24′36″E
Billa Bulla	Bourke Shire	30°35′38″S 145°47′43″E
Booda	Bourke Shire	30°07′18″S 146°18′07″E
Bookambone	Brewarrina Shire	30°22′19″S 146°49′01″E
Bourinawarrina	Bourke Shire	29°59′02″S 146°17′58″E
Bourke	Bourke Shire	30°06′49″S 145°53′09″E
Buccambone	Bourke Shire	30°30′15″S 145°41′25″E
Bunglega	Brewarrina Shire	30°46′32″S 146°51′09″E
Burton	Cobar Shire	30°54′40″S 146°20′23″E
Bye	Bourke Shire	30°38′18″S 146°23′24″E
Cockerminia	Bourke Shire	30°01′34″S 146°11′12″E
Coolibar	Bogan Shire	30°48′44″S 146°56′12″E
Coorilla	Bourke Shire	30°29′43″S 145°54′50″E
Currawynnia	Bourke Shire	30°49′37″S 145°54′04″E
Dalby	Cobar Shire	30°50′44″S 146°14′39″E
Davidson	Bourke Shire	30°04′31″S 146°05′17″E
Dederang	Cobar Shire	30°59′36″S 146°12′28″E
Delatite	Bourke Shire	30°06′31″S 146°11′12″E
Dijoe	Cobar Shire	30°50′48″S 146°00′04″E
Donald	Bourke Shire	30°43′26″S 145°55′23″E
Doradilla	Bourke Shire	30°17′02″S 146°20′00″E
Drouin	Cobar Shire	31°04′34″S 146°14′12″E
Dwyer	Bourke Shire	30°27′04″S 146°08′45″E
East Bourke	Bourke Shire	30°07′09″S 145°58′37″E
Edenhope	Bogan Shire	30°46′05″S 146°26′01″E
Edgeroi	Bourke Shire	30°49′13″S 146°19′41″E
Euroa	Bourke Shire	30°14′51″S 146°08′49″E
Farnell	Bourke Shire	30°27′22″S 145°50′18″E
Finlay	Bourke Shire	30°40′20″S 146°12′17″E
Garfield	Bogan Shire	30°50′05″S 147°00′43″E
Gongolgon	Brewarrina Shire	30°23′48″S 146°55′23″E
Goulburn	Bogan Shire	30°58′46″S 146°34′45″E
Gralga	Brewarrina Shire	30°26′44″S 146°44′41″E
Gruyere	Brewarrina Shire	30°10′30″S 146°28′51″E
Gundawarra	Brewarrina Shire	30°23′07″S 146°40′03″E
Hazelwood	Brewarrina Shire	30°42′04″S 146°33′45″E
Hillsborough	Brewarrina Shire	30°29′09″S 146°50′59″E
Howqua	Brewarrina Shire	30°35′23″S 146°34′56″E
Huntly	Bogan Shire	30°49′59″S 146°29′33″E
Irrewarra	Brewarrina Shire	30°21′11″S 146°25′19″E
Jandra	Bourke Shire	30°12′11″S 145°47′31″E
Jarara	Bogan Shire	31°01′20″S 146°21′41″E
Kaiwilta	Cobar Shire	30°55′30″S 146°02′07″E
Kaniva	Brewarrina Shire	30°29′48″S 146°36′06″E
Kergunyah	Cobar Shire	31°08′24″S 146°06′57″E
Kialla	Brewarrina Shire	30°36′39″S 146°29′10″E
Kitchela	Bourke Shire	30°26′47″S 146°00′07″E
Koorooman	Cobar Shire	31°05′20″S 146°03′00″E
Koroit	Brewarrina Shire	30°45′30″S 146°42′05″E
Lee	Cobar Shire	30°47′31″S 145°57′52″E
Little	Cobar Shire	30°53′25″S 145°56′00″E
Loftus	Brewarrina Shire	30°13′05″S 146°27′57″E
Mackay	Bourke Shire	30°11′59″S 146°04′02″E
Madson	Bogan Shire	30°57′05″S 146°47′36″E
Maffra	Bourke Shire	30°36′28″S 146°20′44″E
Manwanga	Bourke Shire	30°17′15″S 145°44′25″E
Marong	Bourke Shire	30°33′27″S 146°19′34″E
Maroona	Bourke Shire	30°22′22″S 146°00′35″E
Medway	Bogan Shire	30°43′48″S 146°23′58″E
Mialora	Bourke Shire	30°21′10″S 146°09′06″E
Miendetta	Bourke Shire	30°19′12″S 145°53′20″E
Mirboo	Bogan Shire	30°58′01″S 146°25′54″E
Moira	Bourke Shire	30°11′42″S 146°16′12″E
Moodana	Bourke Shire	30°22′13″S 145°41′36″E
Mootcha	Bourke Shire	30°14′38″S 146°20′48″E
Morwell	Cobar Shire	30°56′00″S 146°15′14″E
Mulgawarrina	Brewarrina Shire	30°42′21″S 146°53′51″E
Mulholland	Bourke Shire	30°22′35″S 146°20′33″E
Narragan	Cobar Shire	31°00′22″S 146°04′34″E
Nemina	Brewarrina Shire	30°40′30″S 146°43′39″E
Nidgery	Brewarrina Shire	30°39′13″S 146°51′34″E
Numurkah	Bogan Shire	30°51′10″S 146°38′41″E
Nurathulla	Bourke Shire	30°16′25″S 145°55′20″E
Oakleigh	Brewarrina Shire	30°05′32″S 146°25′10″E
Oakvale	Bourke Shire	30°46′52″S 146°18′55″E
Oliver	Bourke Shire	30°32′23″S 146°08′46″E
Oxley	Bourke Shire	30°08′36″S 146°10′13″E
Parailla	Bourke Shire	30°22′37″S 145°48′17″E
Perayambone	Cobar Shire	30°56′02″S 146°09′25″E
Pink Hills	Brewarrina Shire	30°15′18″S 146°36′12″E
Puthawarrie	Bourke Shire	30°36′32″S 145°59′57″E
Randall	Brewarrina Shire	30°21′19″S 146°44′58″E
Redbank	Bourke Shire	30°25′53″S 145°38′20″E
Richardson	Bogan Shire	unknown
Robertson	Bourke Shire	30°44′04″S 146°16′25″E
Ross	Bourke Shire	30°37′36″S 146°10′53″E
Runnymede	Bogan Shire	30°56′52″S 146°42′18″E
Russell	Brewarrina Shire	30°45′59″S 146°34′38″E
Satiara	Brewarrina Shire	30°27′32″S 146°35′42″E
Sinclair	Brewarrina Shire	30°34′41″S 146°29′08″E
Stanhope	Brewarrina Shire	30°16′22″S 146°26′23″E
Stawell	Bourke Shire	30°18′27″S 146°13′35″E
Stuart	Bogan Shire	30°51′22″S 146°46′17″E
Tarcoon	Brewarrina Shire	30°20′27″S 146°39′27″E
Tilpa	Bourke Shire	30°34′00″S 145°56′02″E
Tobin	Brewarrina Shire	30°27′06″S 146°27′05″E
Trafalgar	Cobar Shire	30°47′46″S 146°04′19″E
Traralgon	Brewarrina Shire	30°48′01″S 146°43′49″E
Trawalla	Bourke Shire	30°24′45″S 146°15′36″E
Tubba	Bogan Shire	30°47′24″S 147°00′07″E
Tuppulmummi	Bourke Shire	30°25′48″S 145°43′58″E
Wadell	Bourke Shire	30°27′45″S 146°18′11″E
Wagra	Cobar Shire	31°02′30″S 146°08′50″E
Wanalta	Brewarrina Shire	30°22′30″S 146°32′33″E
Wangoom	Bogan Shire	30°54′55″S 146°33′00″E
Waterloo	Cobar Shire	30°46′23″S 146°06′23″E
Wererina	Bourke Shire	30°40′30″S 145°49′38″E
West Bogan	Bogan Shire	30°54′14″S 146°51′24″E
Whakoo	Bourke Shire	30°32′56″S 146°00′29″E
Wilga	Cobar Shire	30°51′35″S 146°09′23″E
Willa Murra	Brewarrina Shire	unknown
Yargunyah	Bourke Shire	30°31′35″S 145°49′14″E
Yarraman	Bogan Shire	30°54′17″S 146°57′03″E
Zouch	Bourke Shire	30°19′38″S 146°01′03″E
