= Rock Flat =

- Town
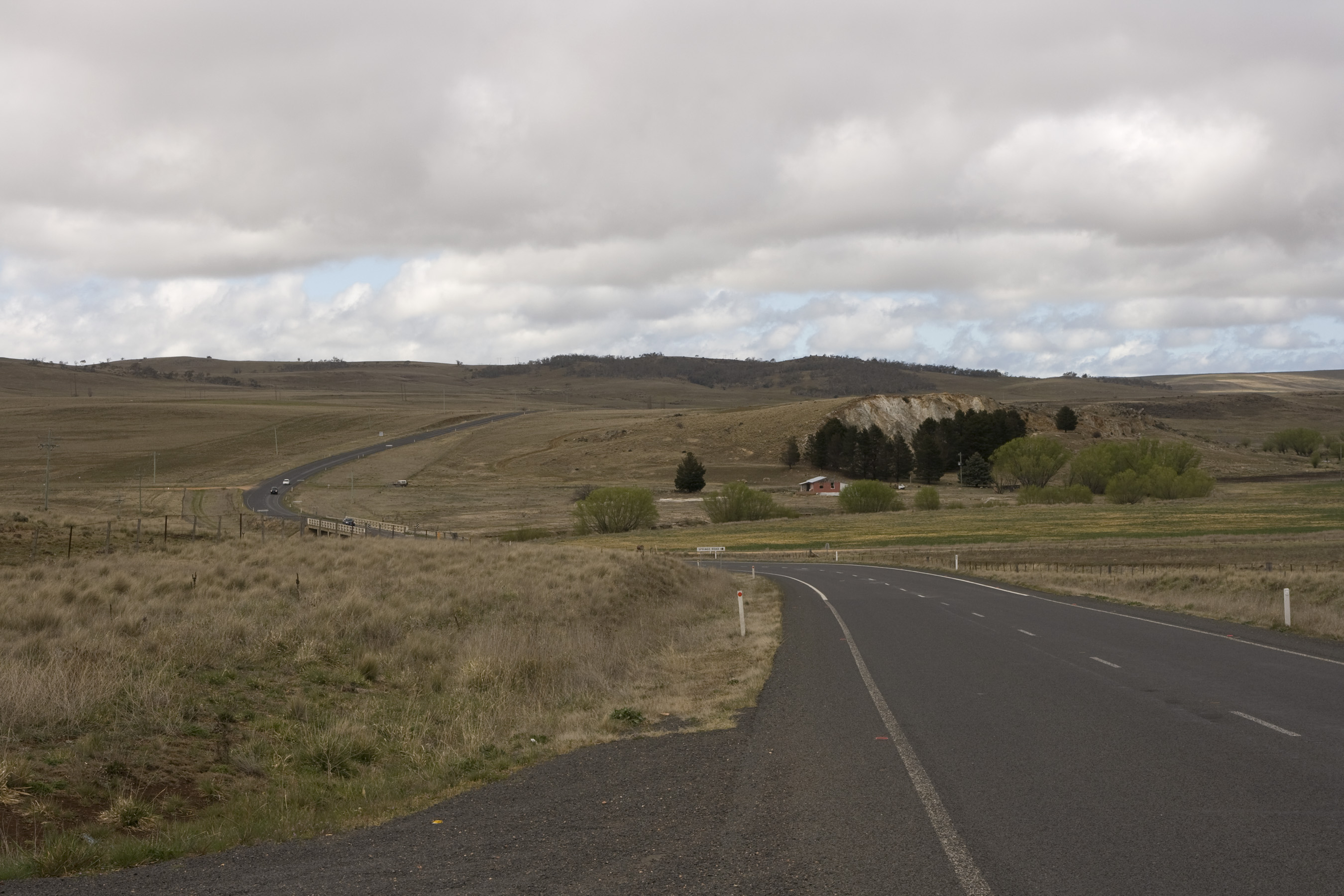
- Monaro Highway crossing of Rock Flat Creek at Rock Flat.

- Interactive map of Rock Flat
- Coordinates: 36°20′49.2″S 149°12′36.5″E
- Country: Australia
- State: New South Wales
- Region: Southern Tablelands
- LGA: Snowy Monaro Regional Council
- Location: 16 km (9.9 mi) S of Cooma; 127 km (79 mi) S of Canberra

Government
  - State electorate: Monaro
  - Federal division: Eden-Monaro

Population
  - Total: 77 (2016 census)
- Postcode: 2630
- County: Beresford
- Parish: Gladstone
Localities around Rock Flat
Pine Valley	Cooma	Carlaminda
Myalla	Rock Flat	Dangelong
Springfield	Nimmitabel	Nimmitabel

Rock Flat is a rural locality in the Snowy Monaro Regional Council local government area of New South Wales, Australia. It is located south of Cooma, on either side of the Monaro Highway.

The area now known as Rock Flat lies on the traditional lands of Ngarigo people.

Near the Monaro Highway crossing of Rock Flat Creek, there is a mineral spring that comes to the surface, on the bank of the creek. The spring water issues from near the base of a small rocky mount composed of highly inclined beds of quartzite and the surface of the flat in the vicinity of the spring is tufaceous limestone that has been deposited there by the spring water. The flow rate of the spring is about 245-litres per hour. The spring water has a pleasant taste and is carbonated. The water contains carbonates of calcium, sodium, and magnesium.

It is likely that this spring is the one referred to as Richard Bourke's Spring by the explorer Dr J. Lhotsky in 1834. Lhotsky had thought highly enough of the spring water to bring bottled samples of it with him on his return journey. The spring was still in its natural state in the 1880s. It was used by local settlers to make bread and damper (presumably making use of minerals that are present in the spring water). Early attempts to bottle the water seem to have failed. The first successful attempts, to exploit the spring commercially, seem to date from around 1900. The spring water was bottled and sold under the name 'Koomah Spa', from that year. It was bottled by the company, E. Rowlands Pty Ltd, using a crown cork, then relatively newly invented, to seal the bottle. The company sent a consignment of its bottled water to Osterley House, in England, and subsequently quoted its owner, Lord Jersey, as saying, "No mineral water comes up to it and it has travelled excellently".

By the late 1930s, the spring was all but forgotten. The spring remained accessible to the public into the 1970s, but is on private property and public access is no longer permitted.

A small deposit of fire clay in the locality has been mined in the past.

Rock Flat became a favoured camping spot for teams on the road south from Cooma. A village of Rock Flat was planned, around 1886, near the site of the spring, but there is no sign of it now except that one of its streets, Cooma Street, still appears on modern day maps. There was a railway station, also known as Rock Flat, that lay within the locality, on the now disused Bombala railway line; it opened in 1912 and closed in 1974. There are some remnants at the railway station site. Rock Flat had a school from 1884 to 1918, and a post office from 1890 to 1978.

== See also ==
- Rock Flat Creek
