= Royal Hotel, Cooma =

Royal Hotel
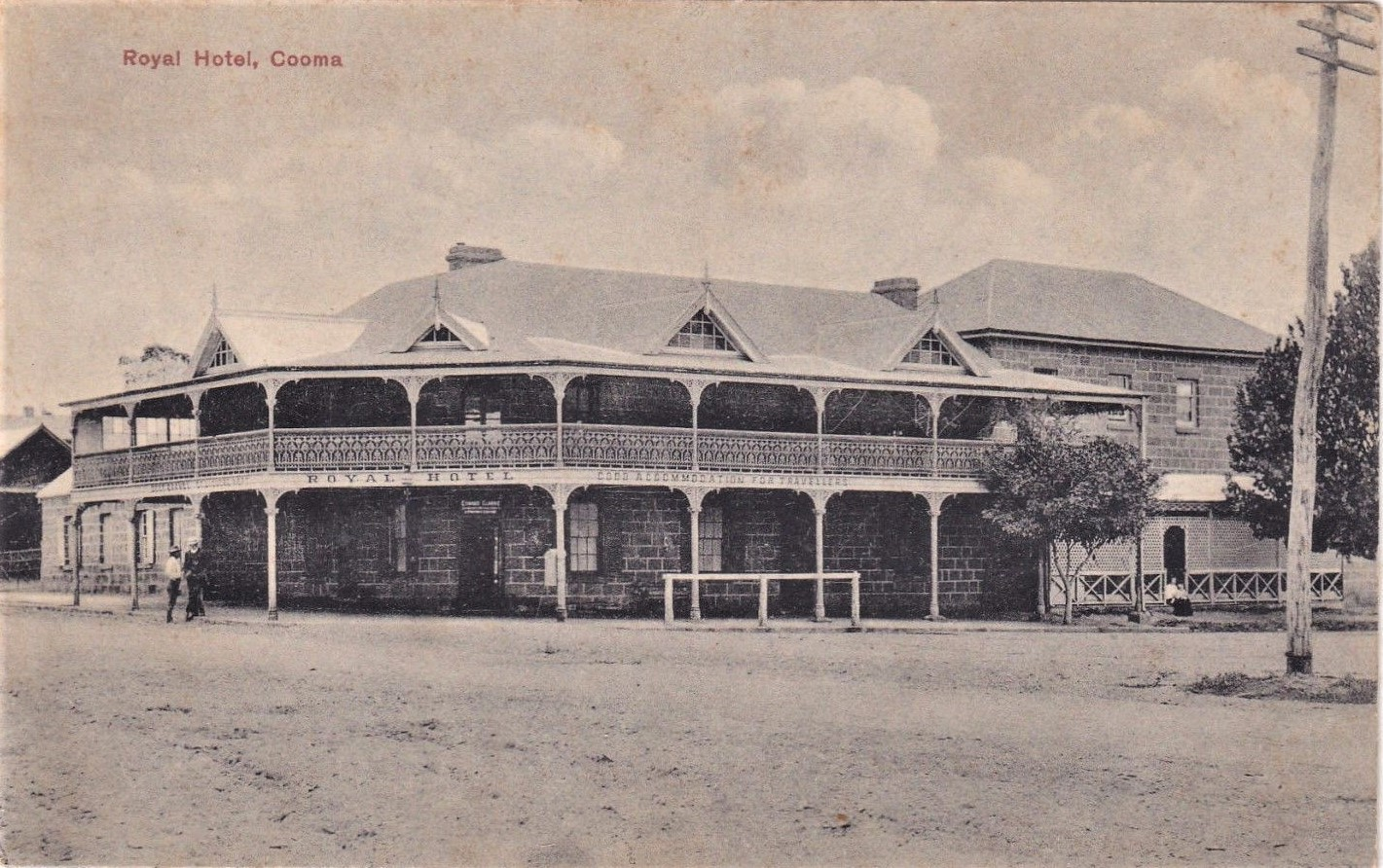

- Location within New South Wales Location within Australia
- 36.2379°S 149.1163°E
- Location: 59–61 Lambie Street, Cooma, Snowy Monaro Regional Council, New South Wales, Australia

History
- Built: 1858

Site notes
- Owner: Royal Hotel

New South Wales Heritage Register
- Official name: Royal Hotel & Outbuildings
- Type: state heritage (built)
- Designated: 2 April 1999
- Reference no.: 616
- Type: Hotel
- Category: Commercial

Royal Hotel is a heritage-listed Australian pub at 59–61 Lambie Street, Cooma, Snowy Monaro Regional Council, New South Wales, Australia. It was built from 1858. It was added to the New South Wales State Heritage Register on 2 April 1999.

== History ==
The original hotel was established in Lambie Street around 1858, less than twenty years after settlement in Cooma first commenced in 1839. Early settlement concentrated in and around Lambie Street which became the focal point of the community activity at the time.

In 1986 several alterations were made to the exterior of the Royal Hotel. Stonework repair involved the steam cleaning and repoint of the front of the hotel. Replacement of lacework was undertaken with a loyalty to the original style. New gutters, downpipes and valley were installed. Sheets of iron for the roof on flat and toilet roof were used to restore the buildings original splendor. The following year the building underwent replacements to the roof, front and side gutters, the eves on the hotel and restaurant plus four new sheets of lacework for the restaurant.

In 1988 a Permanent Conservation Order was placed on the Royal Hotel.

== Description ==
The Royal Hotel is a large two storey hotel with outbuildings all constructed of dressed freestone and build in 1858. It is of simple Georgian style with a late Victorian cast iron decorated verandah and balcony on the street corner and 4 large decorative gables added to the early hipped roof. The two storey wing facing Lambie Street retains its original rolled iron roof and Georgian style 12 paned windows. The building is generally in good order apart from the main bar areas which have been altered in this century and would benefit from restoration.

The Royal Hotel and its outbuildings consist of a stone terrace, a 2-storey house, 2 storey terrace, a brick cottage and semi detached cottages. As a group they collectively exhibit valuable sandstone architecture which provided an outstanding entrance to one of the most interesting historical and architectural streets of Cooma.

The semi detached cottages exist as a pair of Victorian semi with Gothic influences. They rest on stone foundations having bay window fronts, scalloped fretwork gable barges and timber and iron verandahs. Face brick walls relieved by painted stuccoed toothed quoins, door and window reveals and bay window spandrels. Verandah balustrading and stair handrails require restoration otherwise building is in near original condition.

The brick cottage that also forms part of the outbuildings is a neat vernacular residence which preserves the 19th century integrity of the housing group between Tumut Street and the Highway.

A number of significant elements of the original fabric are still intact.

== Heritage listing ==
A fine two storey stone pub with original outbuildings of Georgian/Victorian character which occupies an important site on the Snowy Mountains Highway and which makes a splendid entrance to Lambie Street and its other pleasant residential buildings.

Royal Hotel was listed on the New South Wales State Heritage Register on 2 April 1999 having satisfied the following criteria.

The place is important in demonstrating the course, or pattern, of cultural or natural history in New South Wales.

This hotel is situated in the oldest part of Cooma and is recognised as following the tradition of several architecturally and historically interesting cottages from the 1850s to the later part of the nineteenth century.

The place is important in demonstrating aesthetic characteristics and/or a high degree of creative or technical achievement in New South Wales.

A fine two storey stone pub with original outbuildings of Georgian/ Victorian aesthetic.

The place has strong or special association with a particular community or cultural group in New South Wales for social, cultural or spiritual reasons.

The Royal Hotel conveys at once a sense of history of the development of domestic architecture of the area and a very handsome piece of streetscape.

The place possesses uncommon, rare or endangered aspects of the cultural or natural history of New South Wales.

It is one of the oldest buildings in the Cooma precinct.
