= Loftus Parish (Cowper County), New South Wales =

Loftus Parish is a civil parish of Cowper County, New South Wales; a Cadastral division of New South Wales. located at 30°13'05.0"S 146°27'57.0"E between Byrock, New South Wales and Bourke, New South Wales.

== Geography ==
The Bogan River flows along the northern boundary of the parish which is in Brewarrina Shire. The economy is largely based on agriculture and the parish vegetated in mainly scrub forests. The topography is flat with a Köppen climate classification of BsK (Hot semi arid).
