= Huntly Parish (Cowper County), New South Wales =

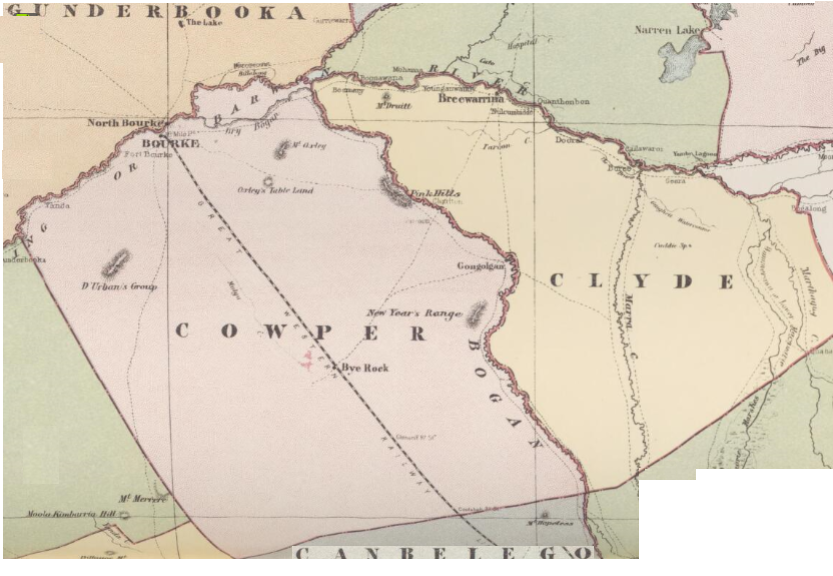
Map of Clyde and Cowper Counties 1886 by John Sands.

Huntley Parish, New South Wales is a Bounded locality of Bogan Shire and a civil Parish of Cowper County, New South Wales, a cadasteral division of central New South Wales.

== Geography ==
The topography of Huntley Parish is flat, and the parish is on the Mitchell Highway and the nearest settlement is Byrock, New South Wales. The Parish is on the Main Western railway line, New South Wales, and Glenariff railway siding is in the parish.

The parish has a Köppen climate classification of BSh (Hot semi arid).
