= Numurkah, New South Wales =

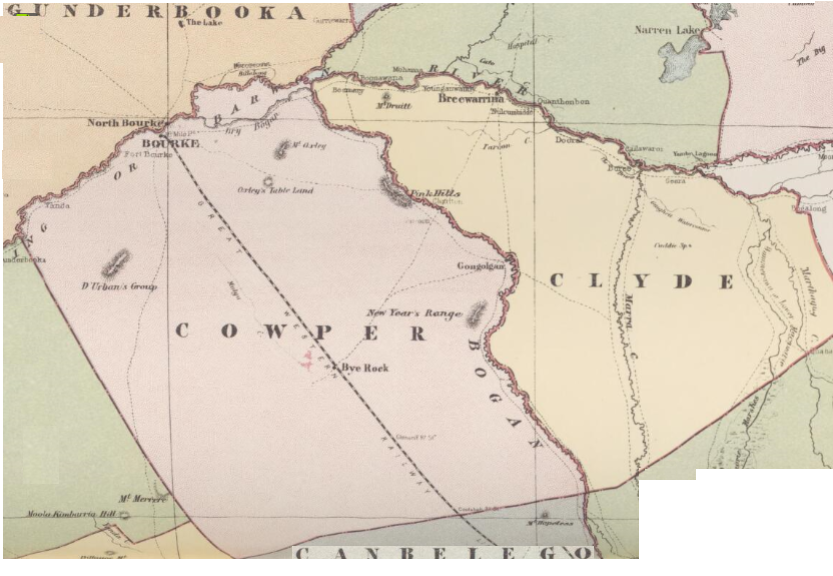
Map of Clyde and Cowper Counties 1886 by John Sands.

Numurkah, New South Wales is a Bounded locality of Bourke Shire and a civil Parish of Cowper County, New South Wales, a cadasteral division of central New South Wales.

== Geography ==
The topography of Numurkah is flat, and is on the Mitchell Highway and the nearest settlement is Byrock, New South Wales. The Parish is on the Main Western railway line, New South Wales.

The Numurkah has a Köppen climate classification of BSh (Hot semi arid).
