= Bye, New South Wales =

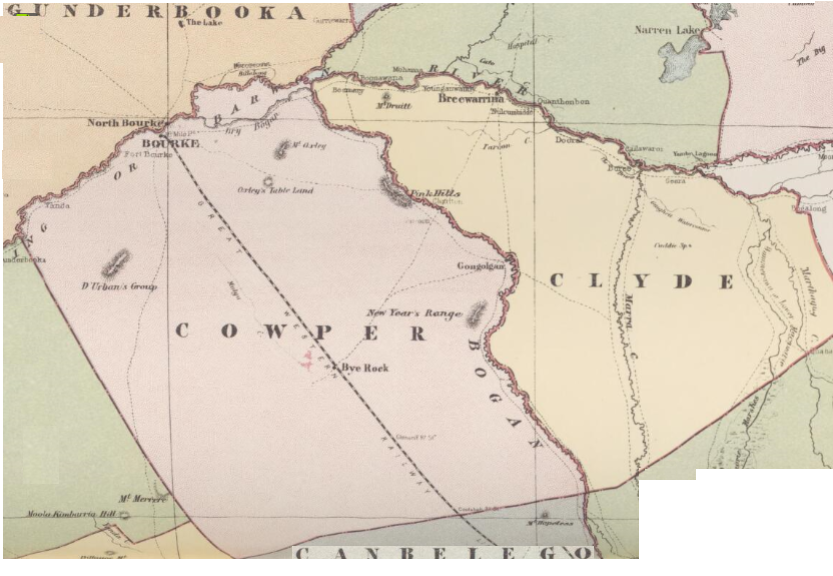
Map of Clyde and Cowper Counties 1886 by John Sands.

Bye, New South Wales is a Bounded locality of Bourke Shire and a civil Parish of Cowper County, New South Wales.

== Geography ==
Bye, New South Wales is located at 30°38'18.0"S 146°23'24.0"E. and the topography is flat. Bye Parish is on the Mitchell Highway and the Main Western railway line, New South Wales, and the only town of the parish is Byrock, New South Wales. Bye has a Köppen climate classification of BSh (Hot semi arid).
