= Dairymans Plains =

- Town
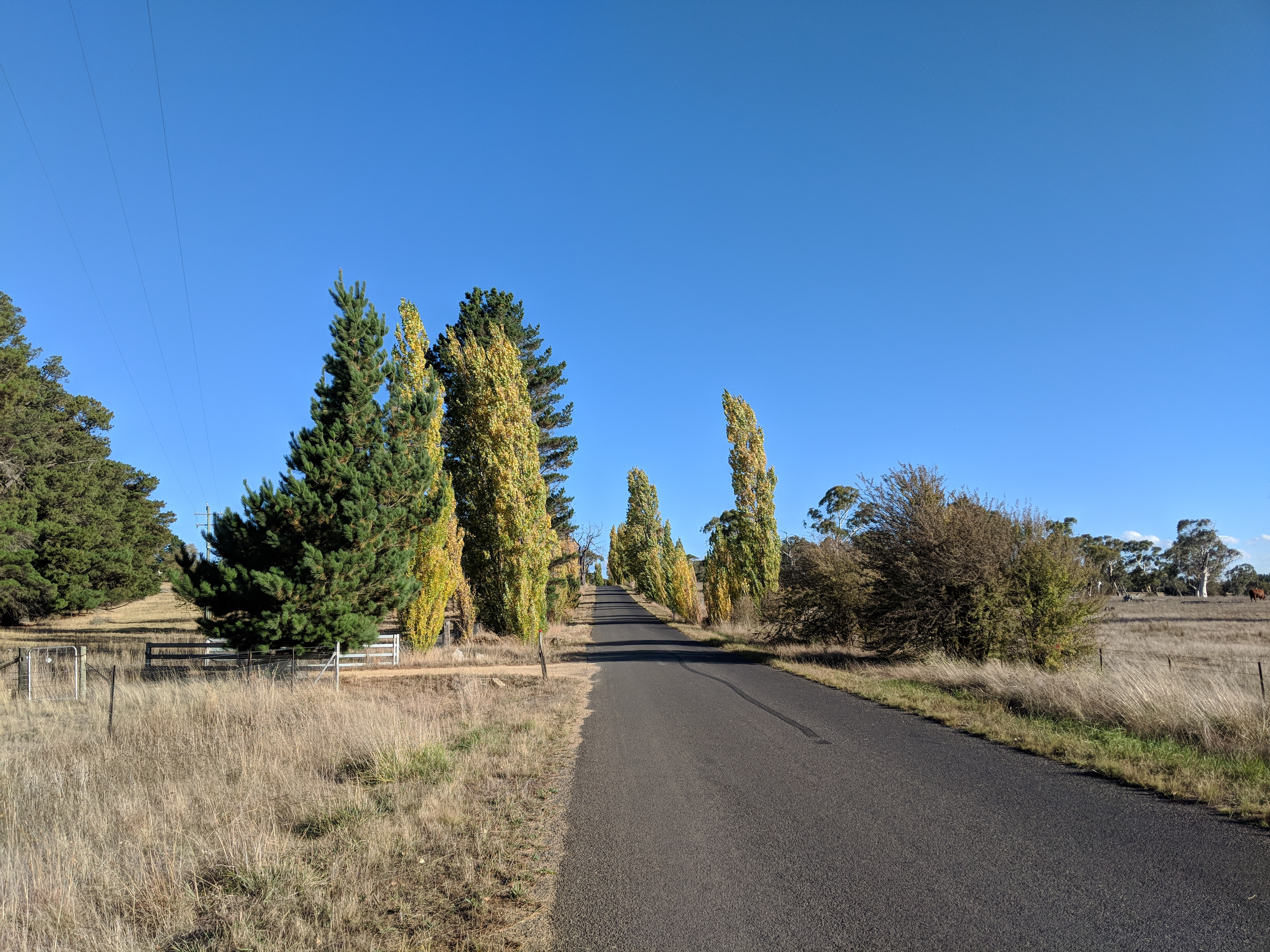

- Coordinates: 36°12′57″S 149°03′02″E
- Country: Australia
- State: New South Wales
- Region: Monaro
- LGA: Snowy Monaro Regional Council
- Location: 8 km (5.0 mi) NW of Cooma

Government
  - State electorate: Monaro
  - Federal division: Eden-Monaro

Population
  - Total: 183 (2021 census)
- Postcode: 2630
- County: Beresford
- Parish: Binjura
Localities around Dairymans Plains
Wambrook	Murrumbucca	Binjura
Wambrook	Dairymans Plains	Cooma
Coolringdon	Pine Valley	Cooma

Dairymans Plains is a locality in the Snowy Monaro Region, New South Wales, Australia. It is located to the north of the Snowy Mountains Highway, to the immediate northwest of Cooma. At the 2021 census, it had a population of 183. It contains grazing country, a rural residential development, Cooma Golf Course and a large car wrecking yard.

Dairymans Plains had a school from 1881 to 1933, described as a "provisional" school from 1881 to 1884 and 1891 to 1899, as a "public" school from 1884 to 1890 and from 1899 to 1913 and a "half-time" school after 1913.
