= Garfield Parish (Cowper County), New South Wales =

Parish in New South Wales, Australia

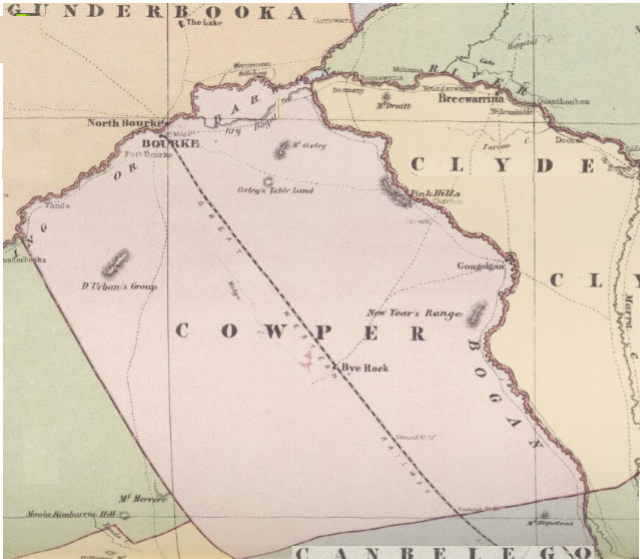
A map of Cowper County (NSW) in 1886. From John Sands Atlas of Australia.

Garfield Parish, New South Wales is a civil Parish of Cowper County, New South Wales, a cadasteral division of central New South Wales.

== Geography ==
The parish is on the Bogan River in Bogan Shire.

The topography of the Parish is flat. The parish has a Köppen climate classification of BSh (Hot semi arid).
