= Medway Parish (Cowper County), New South Wales =

Area in central New South Wales, Australia

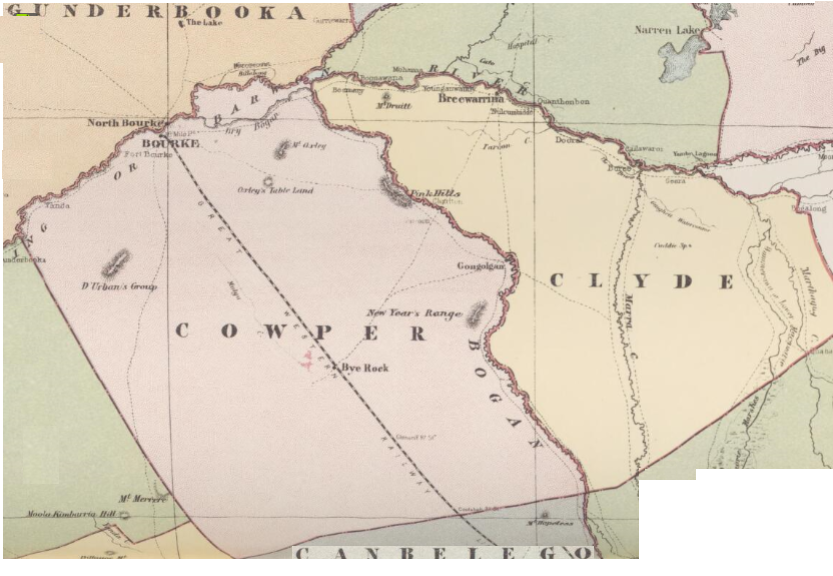
Map of Clyde and Cowper Counties 1886 by John Sands.

Medway Parish, New South Wales is a Bounded locality of Bogan Shire and a civil Parish of Cowper County, New South Wales, a cadasteral division of central New South Wales.

== Geography ==
The parish is on the Mitchell Highway and the Main Western railway line, New South Wales, and the nearest settlement is Byerock, New South Wales a kilometre to the north.

The topography of the Parish is flat. The parish has a Köppen climate classification of BSh (Hot semi arid).
