= Cooma Back Creek =

River in New South Wales, Australia

Cooma Back Lambie
- Location of the Cooma Back Creek mouth in New South Wales

Location
- Country: Australia
- State: New South Wales
- Region: South Eastern Highlands (IBRA), Monaro
- LGA: Snowy Monaro
- Town: Cooma

Physical characteristics
- Source: Great Dividing Range
  - location: below Two Tree Hill
  - coordinates: 36°20′34″S 149°4′11″E
  - elevation: 943 m (3,094 ft)
- Mouth: confluence with Cooma Creek
  - location: Cooma
  - coordinates: 36°13′52″S 149°7′11″E
  - elevation: 785 m (2,575 ft)
- Length: 16 km (9.9 mi)

Basin features
- River system: Murrumbidgee catchment, Murray–Darling basin
- Tributaries
  - right: Jillimatong Creek

The Cooma Back Creek, a mostly–perennial river that is part of the Murrumbidgee catchment within the Murray–Darling basin, is located in the Monaro region of New South Wales, Australia.

== Course and features ==
The Cooma Back Creek (technically a river) rises below Two Tree Hill, south southeast of North Brother and south by east of Middle Brother, part of the Great Dividing Range, and flows generally north and then north by east, joined by one minor tributary before reaching its confluence with the Cooma Creek in the town of Cooma. The Cooma Back Creek descends 157 metres (515 ft) over its 16-kilometre (9.9 mi) course.

The Snowy Mountains Highway crosses Cooma Back Creek in Cooma.

== See also ==
- List of rivers of New South Wales (A-K)
- Rivers of New South Wales
