= Hazelwood Parish (Cowper County), New South Wales =

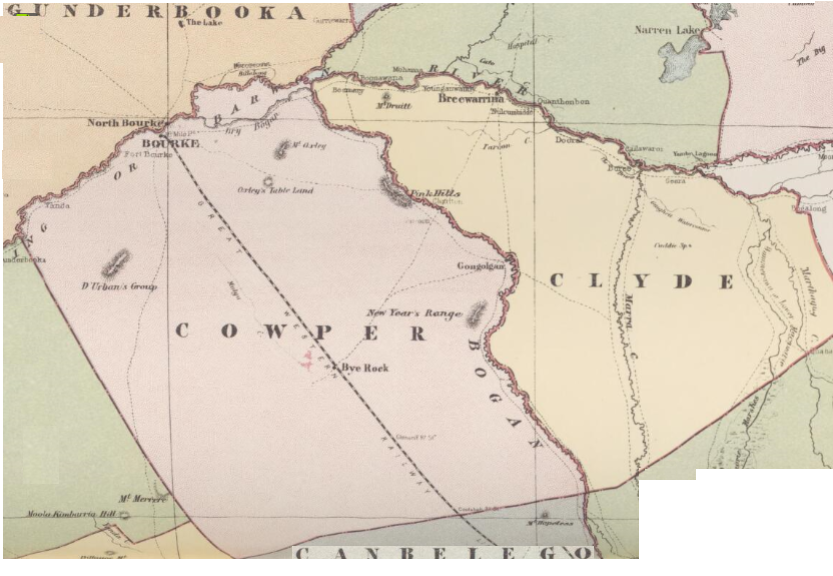
Map of Clyde and Cowper Counties 1886 by John Sands.

Hazelwood Parish, New South Wales is a Bounded locality of Brewarrina Shire and a civil Parish of Cowper County, New South Wales.

== Geography ==
The topography of Hazelwood Parish is flat, and the parish is on the Mitchell Highway and the Main Western railway line, New South Wales, and the nearest settlement is Byrock, New South Wales.

Hazelwood has a Köppen climate classification of BSh (Hot semi arid).
