= Rhine Falls, New South Wales =

Rhine Falls New South Wales
- Coordinates: 36°11′S 148°54′E
- Population: 42 (2016 census)
- Postcode(s): 2630
- Elevation: 1,320 m (4,331 ft)
- LGA(s): Snowy Monaro Regional Council
- State electorate(s): Monaro
- Federal division(s): Eden-Monaro
Localities around Rhine Falls:
Frying Pan	Dry Plain	Dry Plain
Frying Pan	Rhine Falls	Wambrook
Middlingbank	Cootralantra	Coolringdon

Rhine Falls is a locality within the Snowy Monaro Regional Council, halfway between Wambrook and Dry Plain at an altitude of 1,320 metres (4,330 ft); ranking as one of the highest-elevated localities in Australia. Snow occurs frequently from May through to September, and can occur at any time of the year. At the 2016 census, it had a population of 42, the same as neighbouring Dry Plain.

The region is characterised by its vast, flat to gently undulating grazing land on the highest part of the Monaro; beginning at an altitude of approximately 800 metres in the east, soaring to 1,320 metres at the crest of the locality in the west.

Rhine Falls had a school from March 1892 to December 1933, generally described as a "half-time" school, although full-time until 1904 and in 1910 and 1911.
