= Wangoom, New South Wales =

Rural area in New South Wales, Australia

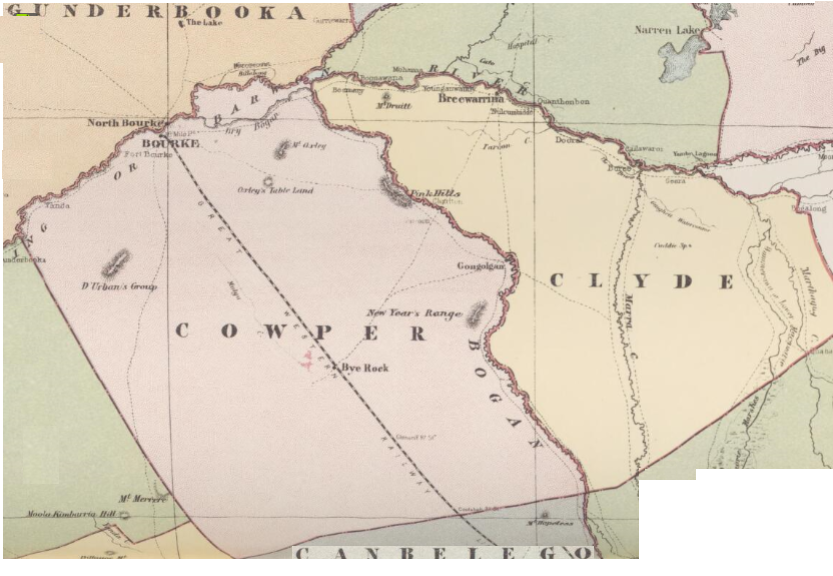
Map of Clyde and Cowper Counties 1886 by John Sands.

Wangoom, New South Wales is a bounded locality of Bogan Shire and a civil parish of Cowper County, New South Wales, a cadasteral division of central New South Wales.

== Geography ==
Wangoom is on the Mitchell Highway and the Main Western railway line, New South Wales, and the nearest settlement is the mining town of Girilambone, New South Wales.

The topography of the Parish is flat. The parish has a Köppen climate classification of BSh (Hot semi arid).
