= Pine Valley, New South Wales =

Pine Valley
- Town
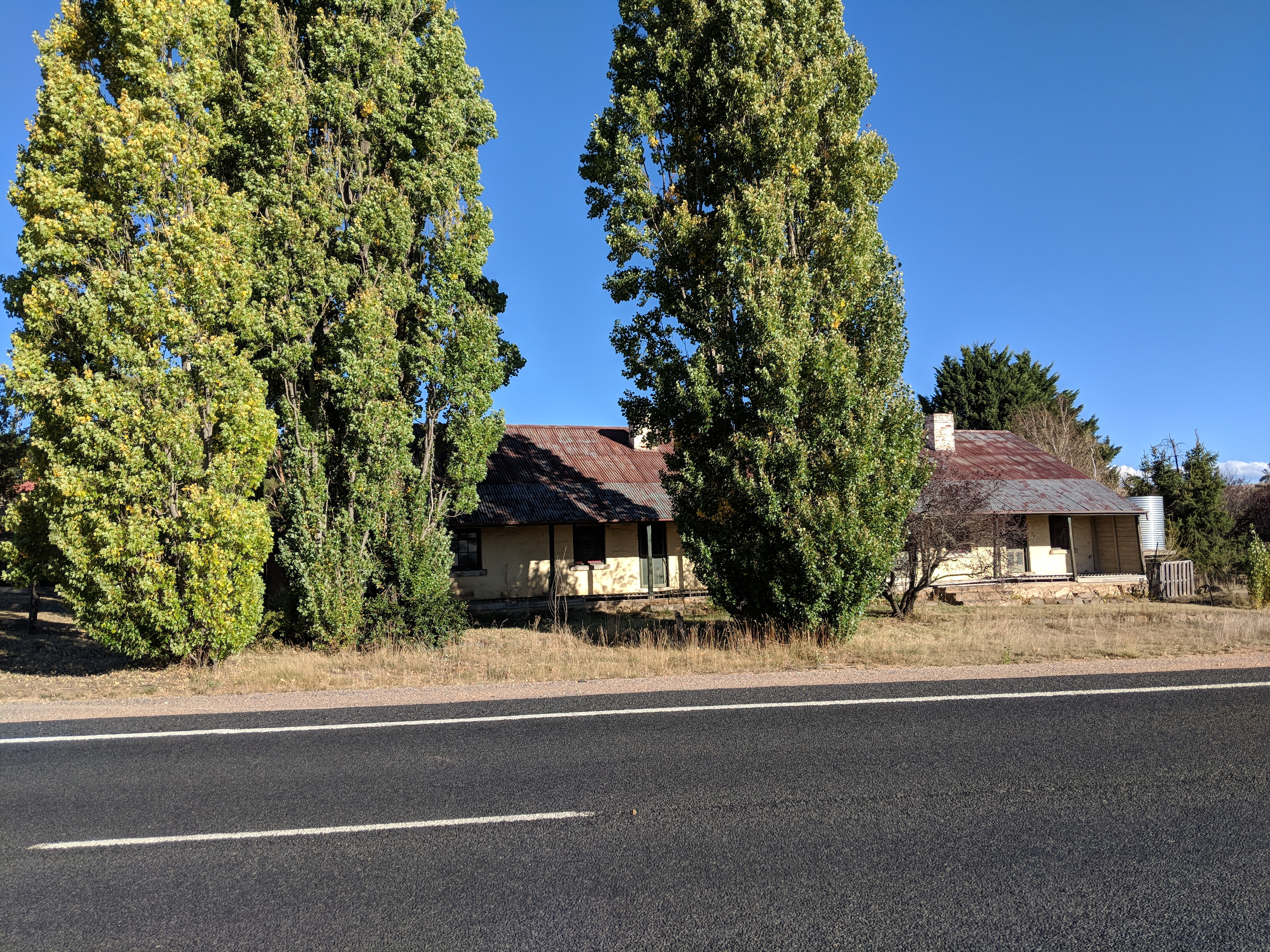

- Coordinates: 36°14′58″S 149°03′39″E
- Country: Australia
- State: New South Wales
- Region: Monaro
- LGA: Snowy Monaro Regional Council
- Location: 8 km (5.0 mi) SW of Cooma

Government
  - State electorate: Monaro
  - Federal division: Eden-Monaro

Population
  - Total: 32 (2016 census)
- Postcode: 2630
- County: Beresford
- Parish: Jillimatong
Localities around Pine Valley
Dairymans Plains	Dairymans Plains	Cooma
Coolringdon	Pine Valley	Cooma
Coolringdon	Coolringdon	Cooma

Pine Valley is a locality in the Snowy Monaro Region, New South Wales, Australia. It is located to the south of the Snowy Mountains Highway, to the immediate southwest of Cooma. At the 2016 census, it had a population of 32.
