= Springfield, New South Wales (Snowy Monaro Regional Council) =

Springfield New South Wales
- Coordinates: 36°32′54″S 149°08′04″E
- Population: 34 (SAL 2021)
- Postcode(s): 2630
- Location: 35 km (22 mi) W of Nimmitabel
- LGA(s): Snowy Monaro Regional Council
- State electorate(s): Monaro
- Federal division(s): Eden-Monaro
Localities around Springfield:
Bobundara	Myalla	Rock Flat
Maffra	Springfield	Nimmitabel
Bungarby	Boco

Springfield is a locality in the Snowy Monaro Regional Council. It is about 35 km west of Nimmitabel and bounded by Bobundara Creek on its northern side and the Maclaughlin River forms part of the southern boundary. Maffra lies further west.
