= Maffra, New South Wales =

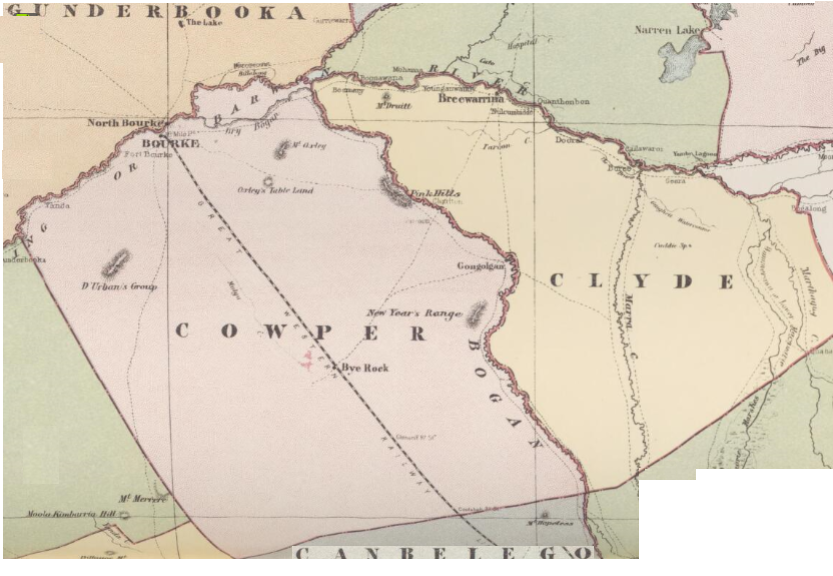
Map of Clyde and Cowper Counties 1886 by John Sands.

Maffra Parish, New South Wales is a Bounded locality of Bourke Shire and a civil Parish of Cowper County, New South Wales, a cadasteral division of central New South Wales. It has a small population of 22 people.

== Geography ==
The parish is on the Mitchell Highway and the Main Western railway line, New South Wales, and the nearest settlement is the town of Byerock a kilometer to the south.

The topography of the Parish is flat. The parish has a Köppen climate classification of BSh (Hot semi arid).
