= Cooma =

- Town
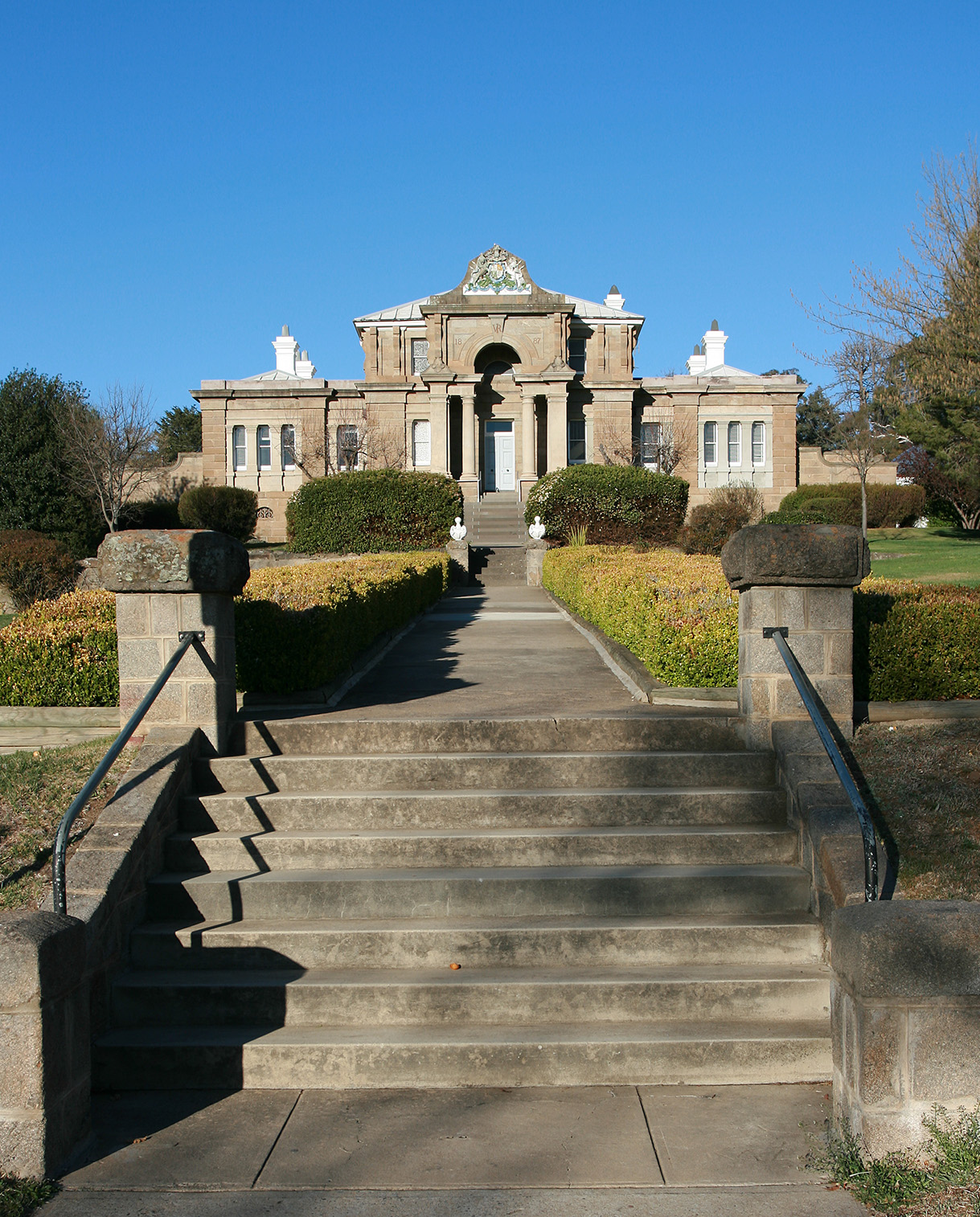
- Cooma Court House

- Coordinates: 36°14′06″S 149°07′33″E
- Country: Australia
- State: New South Wales
- LGA: Snowy Monaro Regional Council
- Location: 397 km (247 mi) SW of Sydney; 116 km (72 mi) S of Canberra; 61 km (38 mi) ENE of Jindabyne; 112 km (70 mi) NW of Bega
- Established: 1849

Government
  - State electorate: Monaro
  - Federal division: Eden-Monaro
- Elevation: 800 m (2,600 ft)

Population
  - Total: 6,715 (SAL 2021)
- Postcode: 2630
- County: Beresford
- Mean max temp: 19.4 °C (66.9 °F)
- Mean min temp: 4.1 °C (39.4 °F)
- Annual rainfall: 541.6 mm (21.32 in)
Localities around Cooma
Binjura	Bunyan	Middle Flat
Dairymans Plains	Cooma	Middle Flat
Pine Valley	The Brothers	Rock Flat

Cooma is a town in the south of New South Wales, Australia. It is located 114 kilometres (71 mi) south of the national capital, Canberra, via the Monaro Highway. It is also on the Snowy Mountains Highway, connecting Bega with the Riverina.

At the 2021 census, Cooma had a population of 6,715. Cooma is the main town of the Monaro region. It is 800 metres (2,620 ft) above sea level. The name could have derived from an Aboriginal word Coombah, meaning 'big lake' or 'open country'.

Cooma is 5 kilometres (3 mi) south of the banks of the Murrumbidgee River, a main tributary of the Murray–Darling basin. Cooma sources its water from the river.

== History ==
The area now known as Cooma lies on the traditional lands of the Ngarigo people.

Cooma was explored by Captain J. M. Currie in 1823. It was first surveyed in 1840, and was gazetted in 1849. Cooma was proclaimed a municipality in 1879.

The railway from Sydney was extended from Royalla to Cooma in 1889 under the supervision of John Whitton. The line was closed to rail passenger traffic in 1989. The estimated population of Cooma was 47 in 1851 and it grew to 2330 (1911), 1969 (1933), 2249 (1947), 9103 (1966), 7353 (1976) and 7978 (1981).

In 1949, the town became the headquarters of the Snowy Mountains Scheme and grew rapidly. Between 1949 and 1974 the population expanded due to an influx of 65,000 workers from more than 30 countries. Those working on the Snowy Scheme depended on the railway and during construction of the scheme, the railways were one of the largest employers in the region. In 1959, the tenth anniversary of the scheme was celebrated with the erection of an avenue of flags representing the 27 nationalities of people working on the scheme.

Cooma has developed a growing tourism industry as it became the main rest stop for many travellers heading to the NSW snow fields during the winter months. As a result, the town nicknamed itself the 'Gateway to the Snowy Mountains'.

The Aviation Pioneers' Memorial at Cooma contains artifacts recovered from the Avro 618 Ten aircraft Southern Cloud, which crashed on 21 March 1931 in the Toolong range of the Australian Alps. The wreck was not found until 26 October 1958.

== Heritage listings ==
Cooma has a number of heritage-listed sites, including:

- Bradley Street: Cooma railway station, designed by railway engineer John Whitton (1820–1898);
- 59–61 Lambie Street: Royal Hotel; and
- Sharp Street: Rock Bolting Development Site.

The Cooma courthouse was designed by Colonial Architect James Barnet, and built by later-NSW Labour Party co-founder John Gough (1848–1907) by 1888, and is considered "an exceptional, rare example of a Victorian Mannerist style courthouse".

== Population ==
Historical population
Year	Pop.	±%
1921	1,834	—
1933	1,969	+7.4%
1947	2,249	+14.2%
1954	6,506	+189.3%
1961	8,716	+34.0%
1966	9,106	+4.5%
1971	7,788	−14.5%
1976	7,353	−5.6%
1981	7,978	+8.5%
1986	7,406	−7.2%
1991	7,385	−0.3%
1996	7,150	−3.2%
2001	6,914	−3.3%
2006	6,587	−4.7%
2011	6,664	+1.2%
2016	6,681	+0.3%
2021	6,715	+0.5%
Source: Australian Bureau of Statistics data.

According to the 2021 census, there were 6,715 people in Cooma.

- Aboriginal and Torres Strait Islander people made up 4.5% of the population.
- 77.8% of people were born in Australia; the next most common countries of birth included England at 2.2%, New Zealand at 1.6%, Germany at 1.3%, India at 1.1%, and Italy at 0.9%.
- 82.7% of people spoke only English at home; the next most common languages spoken at home included Italian at 0.8%, German at 0.7%, Nepali at 0.5%, Spanish at 0.5%, and Urdu at 0.4%.
- The most common responses for religion included No Religion 36.3%, Catholic 23.6%, Anglican 18.7%, and Uniting Church 2.0%; a further 9.5% of respondents for this area elected not to disclose their religious status.

== Education ==
Government schools include Monaro High School, a high school that serves the town and seven of the neighbouring rural towns and villages including Peak View, Berridale, Jindabyne, Nimmitabel, Bredbo and Dalgety. The other two government schools support primary education and are Cooma Public School and Cooma North Public School, both providing education for students in Kindergarten to Year 6.

The Roman Catholic school is called St Patrick's Parish School and provides education from Kindergarten to Year 10. The Snowy Mountains Christian School, an independent Christian school provides education from Kindergarten to Year 10.

Tertiary education is provided by TAFE NSW Illawarra Institute Cooma campus. Another tertiary education centre is the Cooma Universities Centre, which opened in 2014.

== Climate ==
Cooma has a dry oceanic climate (Cfb). Summer averages are mild to warm, though tend to swing wildly between hot and cool, at times cold; and winters are chilly with particularly cold night time temperatures due to its valley location, high elevation, and frequent clear skies, sometimes recording the lowest temperatures in the country. However, daytime maximum temperatures in winter are often unremarkable on account of the foehn effect.

The area is exceptionally dry by southeast coastal Australian standards as it lies in a major rain shadow; the region is flanked by mountain ranges on all sides, most notably on the west. Despite its dryness, it has only 90.1 clear days annually, lower than the adjacent coastal areas of Wollongong and Sydney (106 and 107 clear days respectively). Strong cold fronts often push through the region in winter and snow is not uncommon in Cooma from June to September, though is generally light and rarely settles for more than 24 hours. Frost occurs in all months of the year and is frequent between April and October. Severe thunderstorms are semi-frequent in summer, and owing to the elevation of the town can carry large quantities of hail.

Climate data for Cooma Visitors Centre (1991–2020, extremes 1973–2025); 778 m AMSL; 36.23° S, 149.12° E
Month	Jan	Feb	Mar	Apr	May	Jun	Jul	Aug	Sep	Oct	Nov	Dec	Year
Record high °C (°F)	40.0 (104.0)	38.9 (102.0)	35.2 (95.4)	30.4 (86.7)	24.2 (75.6)	19.6 (67.3)	20.9 (69.6)	24.5 (76.1)	29.4 (84.9)	33.1 (91.6)	36.5 (97.7)	37.8 (100.0)	40.0 (104.0)
Mean maximum °C (°F)	36.2 (97.2)	33.7 (92.7)	30.2 (86.4)	25.6 (78.1)	21.2 (70.2)	16.7 (62.1)	15.9 (60.6)	19.3 (66.7)	23.5 (74.3)	27.4 (81.3)	30.9 (87.6)	32.9 (91.2)	36.7 (98.1)
Mean daily maximum °C (°F)	28.0 (82.4)	26.1 (79.0)	23.6 (74.5)	19.6 (67.3)	15.5 (59.9)	11.9 (53.4)	11.5 (52.7)	13.2 (55.8)	16.5 (61.7)	19.8 (67.6)	22.8 (73.0)	25.4 (77.7)	19.5 (67.1)
Daily mean °C (°F)	19.7 (67.5)	18.5 (65.3)	15.9 (60.6)	11.7 (53.1)	7.9 (46.2)	5.4 (41.7)	4.5 (40.1)	5.7 (42.3)	8.9 (48.0)	11.8 (53.2)	15.0 (59.0)	17.5 (63.5)	11.9 (53.4)
Mean daily minimum °C (°F)	11.4 (52.5)	10.9 (51.6)	8.2 (46.8)	3.7 (38.7)	0.2 (32.4)	−1.3 (29.7)	−2.5 (27.5)	−1.9 (28.6)	1.2 (34.2)	3.8 (38.8)	7.2 (45.0)	9.4 (48.9)	4.2 (39.6)
Mean minimum °C (°F)	4.2 (39.6)	3.9 (39.0)	0.9 (33.6)	−2.8 (27.0)	−6.0 (21.2)	−7.7 (18.1)	−8.2 (17.2)	−7.9 (17.8)	−5.6 (21.9)	−2.9 (26.8)	0.4 (32.7)	1.7 (35.1)	−9.2 (15.4)
Record low °C (°F)	−0.2 (31.6)	−1.0 (30.2)	−1.9 (28.6)	−6.5 (20.3)	−8.6 (16.5)	−11.5 (11.3)	−11.4 (11.5)	−10.5 (13.1)	−8.6 (16.5)	−6.8 (19.8)	−3.9 (25.0)	−3.0 (26.6)	−11.5 (11.3)
Average precipitation mm (inches)	61.6 (2.43)	69.0 (2.72)	49.4 (1.94)	29.4 (1.16)	23.8 (0.94)	44.3 (1.74)	29.2 (1.15)	28.6 (1.13)	31.5 (1.24)	39.4 (1.55)	60.7 (2.39)	62.6 (2.46)	529.7 (20.85)
Average precipitation days (≥ 1.0 mm)	6.3	6.6	5.4	4.5	3.8	4.9	5.0	5.2	5.9	6.3	7.8	6.8	68.5
Average afternoon relative humidity (%)	41	44	44	47	52	59	55	47	44	43	44	43	47
Source: Bureau of Meteorology

The airport is located at a higher elevation than the town, causing maximum temperatures to be notably cooler but winter minima somewhat milder.

Climate data for Cooma Airport AWS (1991–2020, extremes 1991–2025); 930 m AMSL; 36.29° S, 148.97° E
Month	Jan	Feb	Mar	Apr	May	Jun	Jul	Aug	Sep	Oct	Nov	Dec	Year
Record high °C (°F)	39.1 (102.4)	38.0 (100.4)	36.0 (96.8)	30.0 (86.0)	23.8 (74.8)	21.9 (71.4)	19.7 (67.5)	25.4 (77.7)	27.7 (81.9)	29.3 (84.7)	35.9 (96.6)	37.7 (99.9)	39.1 (102.4)
Mean maximum °C (°F)	35.2 (95.4)	33.0 (91.4)	29.1 (84.4)	24.5 (76.1)	20.0 (68.0)	16.0 (60.8)	15.1 (59.2)	18.2 (64.8)	22.2 (72.0)	26.1 (79.0)	29.7 (85.5)	32.3 (90.1)	35.8 (96.4)
Mean daily maximum °C (°F)	26.8 (80.2)	25.0 (77.0)	22.4 (72.3)	18.2 (64.8)	14.2 (57.6)	10.7 (51.3)	10.3 (50.5)	11.9 (53.4)	15.1 (59.2)	18.4 (65.1)	21.4 (70.5)	24.2 (75.6)	18.2 (64.8)
Daily mean °C (°F)	18.9 (66.0)	17.7 (63.9)	15.1 (59.2)	11.1 (52.0)	7.4 (45.3)	4.8 (40.6)	4.2 (39.6)	5.2 (41.4)	8.1 (46.6)	11.0 (51.8)	14.0 (57.2)	16.5 (61.7)	11.2 (52.1)
Mean daily minimum °C (°F)	10.9 (51.6)	10.3 (50.5)	7.7 (45.9)	3.9 (39.0)	0.6 (33.1)	−1.1 (30.0)	−2.0 (28.4)	−1.5 (29.3)	1.1 (34.0)	3.6 (38.5)	6.6 (43.9)	8.7 (47.7)	4.1 (39.3)
Mean minimum °C (°F)	2.8 (37.0)	2.8 (37.0)	−0.1 (31.8)	−3.5 (25.7)	−6.5 (20.3)	−7.9 (17.8)	−8.5 (16.7)	−8.4 (16.9)	−6.3 (20.7)	−4.3 (24.3)	−1.3 (29.7)	0.1 (32.2)	−9.6 (14.7)
Record low °C (°F)	−2.2 (28.0)	−1.2 (29.8)	−2.7 (27.1)	−8.4 (16.9)	−9.7 (14.5)	−11.0 (12.2)	−10.8 (12.6)	−11.0 (12.2)	−9.4 (15.1)	−9.2 (15.4)	−5.6 (21.9)	−3.5 (25.7)	−11.0 (12.2)
Average precipitation mm (inches)	55.8 (2.20)	54.7 (2.15)	45.0 (1.77)	31.0 (1.22)	23.6 (0.93)	42.2 (1.66)	26.8 (1.06)	31.9 (1.26)	33.0 (1.30)	43.6 (1.72)	61.5 (2.42)	51.1 (2.01)	501.7 (19.75)
Average precipitation days (≥ 1.0 mm)	6.0	6.3	5.1	4.7	4.2	5.1	5.0	4.7	5.8	6.4	7.2	6.2	66.7
Average afternoon relative humidity (%)	39	43	43	46	54	60	57	48	46	43	43	39	47
Average dew point °C (°F)	7.0 (44.6)	8.1 (46.6)	6.3 (43.3)	4.0 (39.2)	3.1 (37.6)	1.6 (34.9)	0.2 (32.4)	−0.8 (30.6)	0.7 (33.3)	2.1 (35.8)	4.2 (39.6)	5.2 (41.4)	3.5 (38.3)
Source: Bureau of Meteorology

== Mosaic Time Walk ==
The Cooma–Monaro Time Walk in Centennial Park was a community project to mark the Bicentennial Year of 1988, from designs by Cooma College of TAFE and the Cooma–Monaro Historical Society.

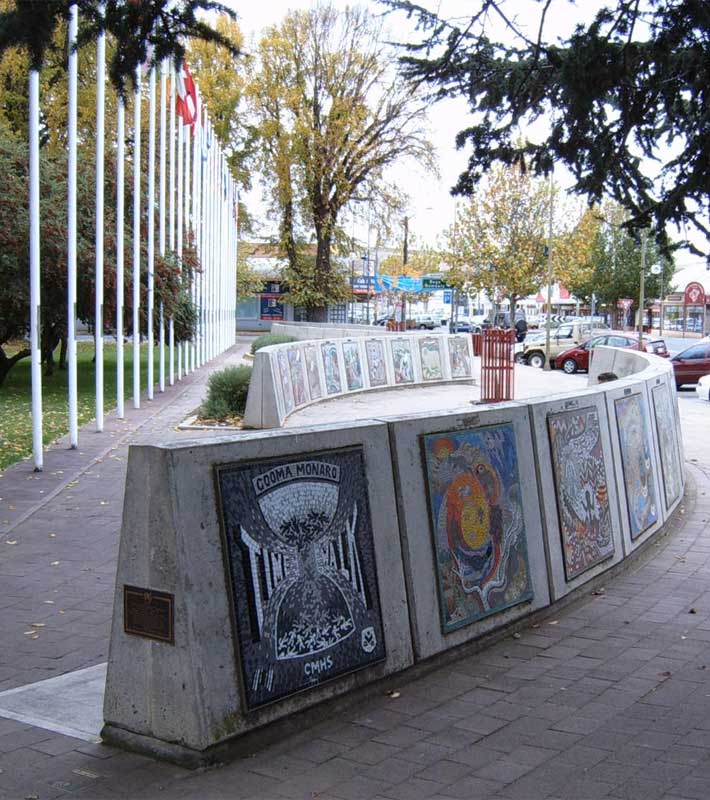

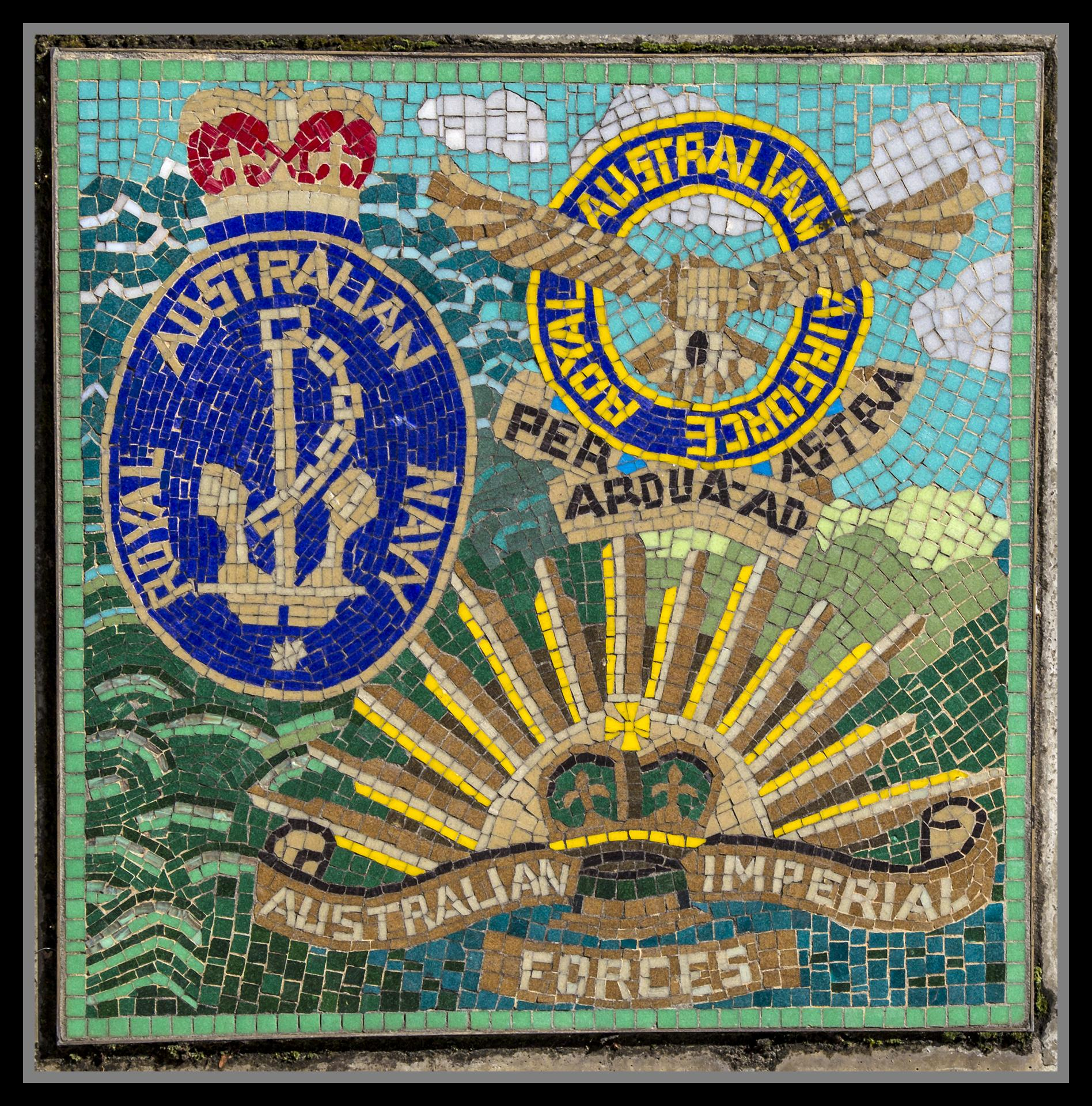

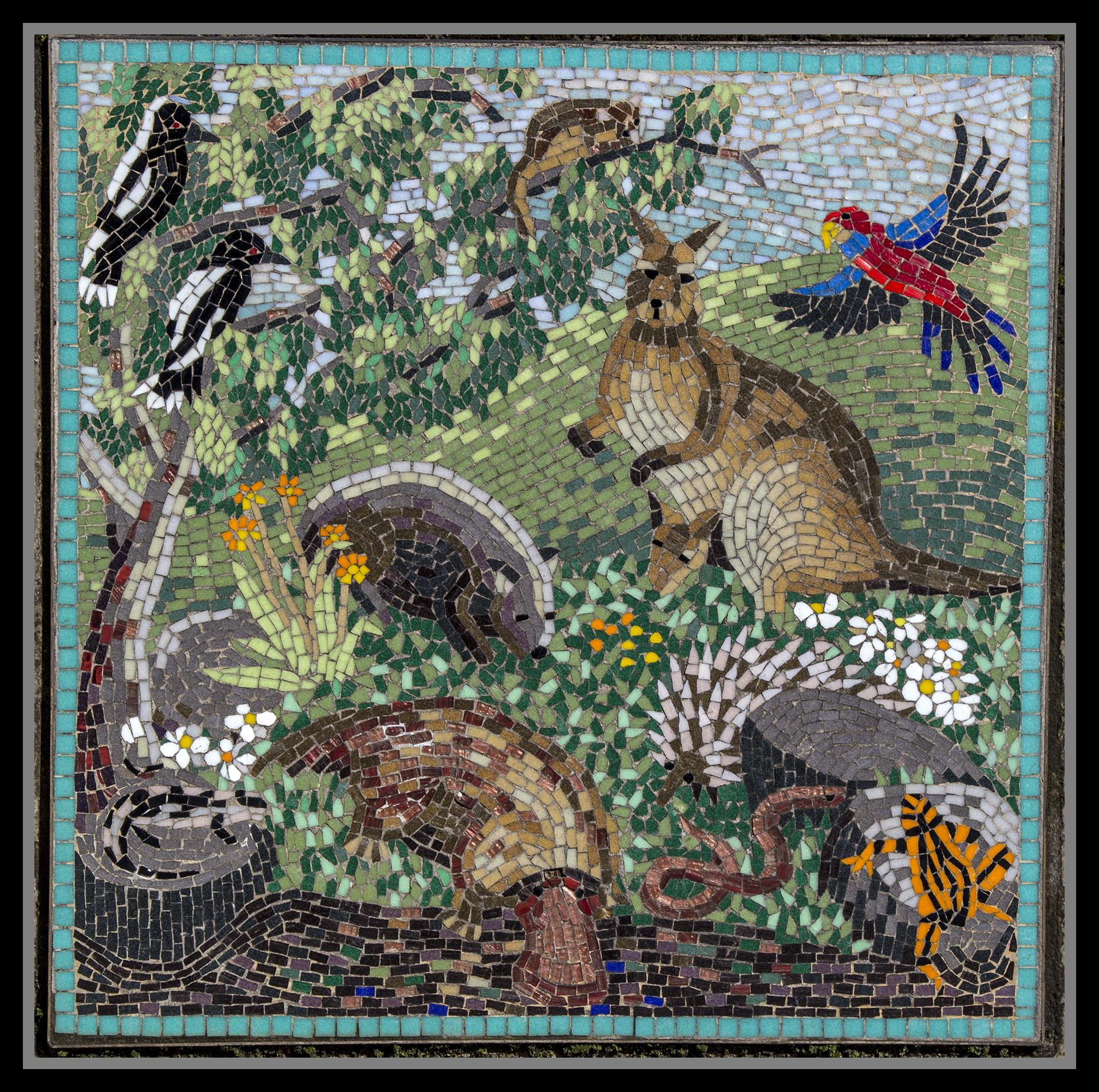

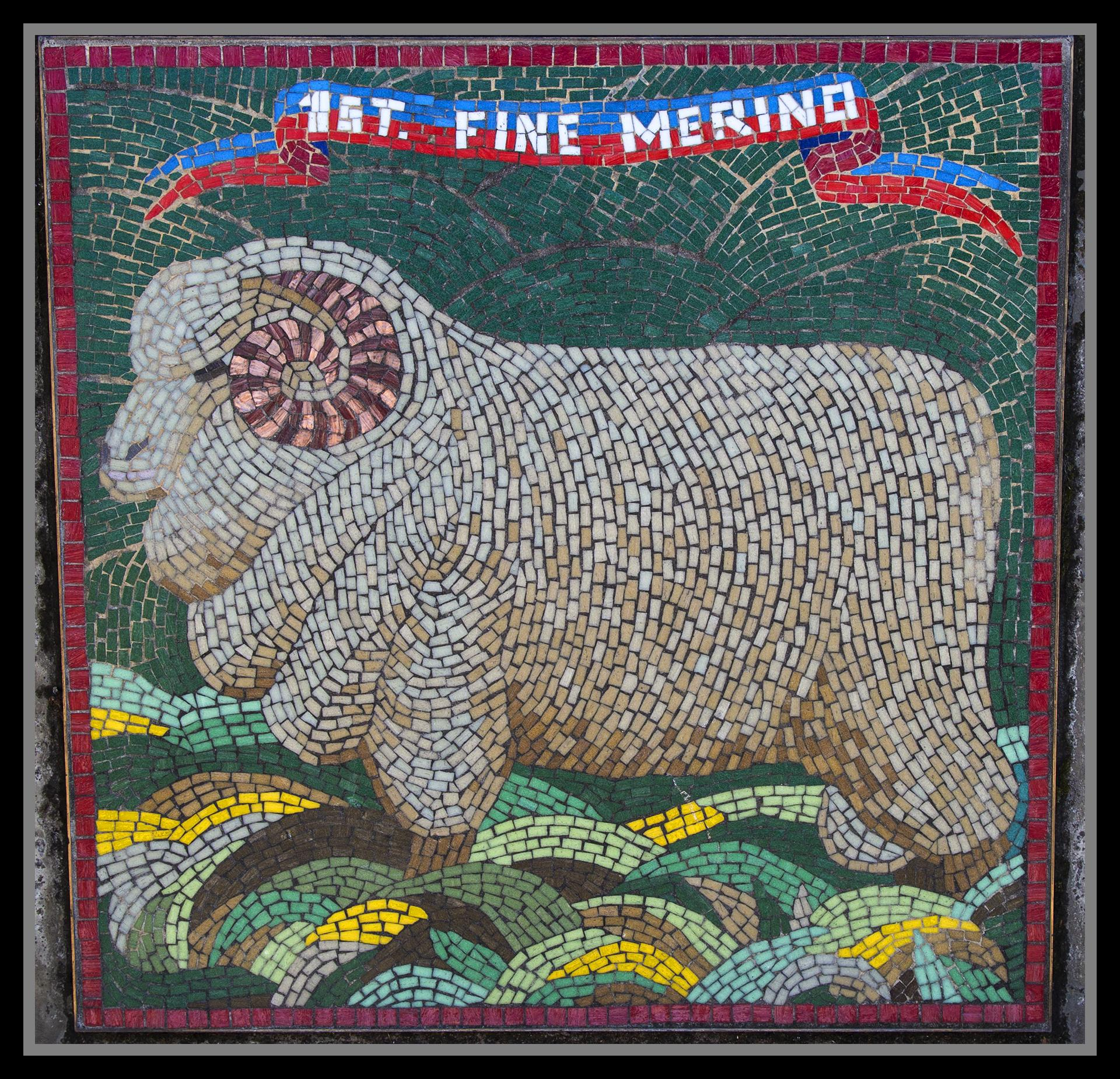

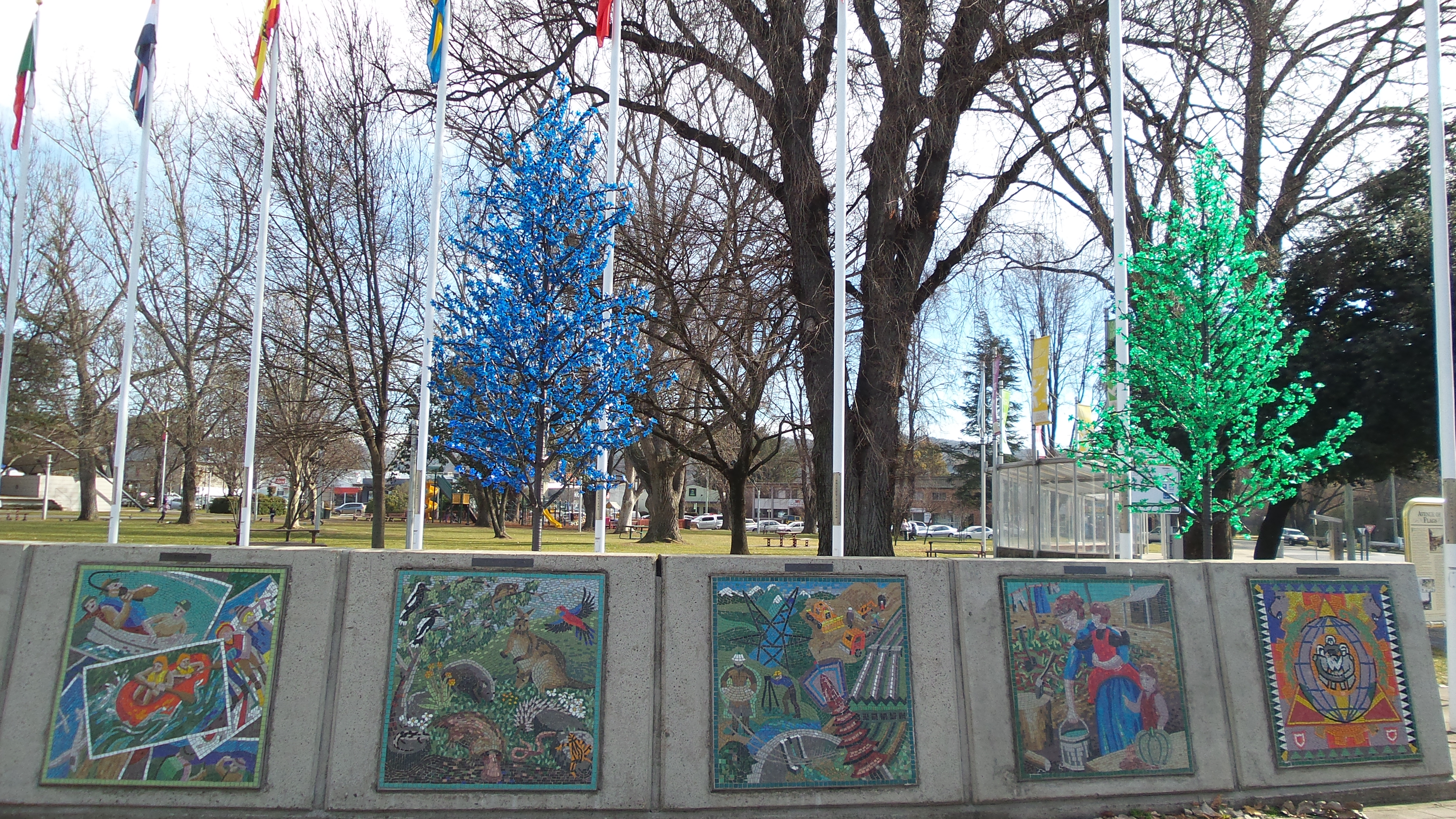

== Media ==
=== Newspapers ===
One newspaper operates in Cooma, The Monaro Post, which began in 2006 and is independently owned by Gail Eastaway, Tracy Frazer and Louise Platts.

=== Radio stations ===
- XLFM 96.1 FM (commercial)
- Snow FM 97.7 FM (commercial)
- Triple J 100.1 FM
- ABC South-East 810 AM/1602 AM
- Radio National 95.3 FM/100.9 FM
- ABC Classic 99.3
- Monaro FM 90.5 (community)
- Racing Radio 96.9 FM
- Vision Radio 88.0 FM (narrowcast, relay)

Note: transmitters for XLFM and Snow FM, as well as some ABC services, are in place throughout the Snowy Mountains.

=== Television ===
Cooma receives five free-to-air television networks including all the digital free-to-air channels relayed from Canberra, broadcast from the Telstra site Radio Hill translator in Cooma Common, off Polo Flat Road.

The stations are:

- ABC
- SBS
- Seven
- Nine (WIN)
- Network 10

Another transmitter for the Cooma and surrounding Monaro region is located at Mount Roberts approximately 30 km NNE of the town, broadcasting The Three Commercial TV Networks and the ABC Television services, but not SBS Television Services.

== Sports ==
Cooma has several sports teams, the most popular sports played in town being rugby league, rugby union, cricket, soccer and Australian rules football.

The Cooma Colts is the town's junior rugby league team, the Stallions (founded 1973) is the senior rugby league team and the rugby league tag team known as the Fillies also plays during the rugby league season.

The Cooma Tigers (founded 1952) soccer team plays in local competitions.

The Southern Cats (formerly Cooma Cats founded in 1975) Australian rules football club is based at the Snowy Oval and participates in the AFL Canberra Community Division 3.

== Transport ==
Cooma is served by Cooma–Snowy Mountains Airport, which is 15 kilometres (9.3 mi) from the CBD. However, the airport only provides limited air services. The nearest major airport is Canberra Airport which is located 113 kilometres (70 mi) north of Cooma. The town has a bus service connecting various areas of town three times a day run by Cooma Coaches. Snowliner Coaches also operate services. Cooma has a taxi service run by Cooma Radio Taxis.

NSW TrainLink operate road coach services from Canberra to Bombala and Eden. Cooma was served by the Cooma Mail until May 1986 and the Canberra Monaro Express until September 1988.

The Cooma Monaro Railway is a heritage railway using CPH railmotors built in the 1920s. Until operations were suspended in January 2014 the railway provided a weekend and public-holiday service on an 18 kilometres (11 mi) section of the Bombala railway line north to Bunyan and Chakola.

== Notable people ==
- Samantha Armytage (born 1976), breakfast show host.
- Larissa Behrendt (born 1969(, legal academic, filmmaker, advocate.
- John Bērziņš (born 1956), first Australian-born orthodox bishop, Bishop of Caracas of the Russian Orthodox Church Outside Russia.
- Torah Bright (born 1986), Olympic snowboarder.
- Nick Cotric (born 1998), rugby league player in the National Rugby League and New South Wales rugby league team representative.
- Jeff Dowdell (born 1987), professional basketball player.
- Carmen Duncan (1942–2019), actress and activist.
- Paula Duncan (born 1952), actress.
- Ole Jacob Frich (1954–2015), Norwegian politician, born in Cooma.
- Michael Gordon (born 1983), rugby league player in the National Rugby League.
- Alec Derwent Hope (1907–2000), poet and essayist.
- Pat Hughes DFC (1917–1940), Royal Australian Air Force fighter ace, killed in the Battle of Britain.
- Virginia Judge (1956–2026), NSW politician and mayor of Strathfield.
- Scott Kneller (born 1989), freestyle skier.
- Horst Kwech (1937–2019), Austrian-born Cooma-raised motor racing driver in the early US based Trans-Am Series.
- Steve Liebmann (born 1944), journalist and radio broadcaster.
- Dugald Munro (1930–1973), grazier and Australian politician.
- Laurie Nichols (1919–2000), wood carter and rugby league fanatic.
- Matt Paternoster (1880–1962), Australian rules footballer, resided in Cooma.
- Pat Power (1942–2025), Catholic bishop.
- Joan Richmond (1905–1999), racing driver.
- Anneliese Seubert (born 1973), German-born Cooma-raised model.
- Angus Taylor (born 1966), Leader of the Australian Liberal Party (2026 – present).
- John Tierney (born 1946), Australian senator.
- Imants Tillers (born 1950), Sydney born Cooma-based artist and writer
- John Tranter (1943–2023), poet and publisher.
- David Twohill (born 1954), musician, including with Mental As Anything band.
- Lou Wall, comedian.
- Wilton Welch (1884–1952), actor and playwright.
- Brett White (born 1982), rugby league player in the National Rugby League.
- Jack Williams (born 1996), rugby league player in the National Rugby League.
- Sam Williams (born 1991), rugby league player in the National Rugby League.
- Charlotte Wood AM (born 1965), novelist and writer.

== See also ==
- Cooma Correctional Centre
- Snowy Mountains Scheme
- Bombala railway line – Railway line through Cooma
