= Eucumbene =

- Suburb
- Coordinates: 36°08′07″S 148°37′37″E
- Country: Australia
- State: New South Wales
- LGA: Snowy Monaro Regional Council

Population
  - Total: 12 (2016 census)
- Postcode: 2618
Suburbs around Eucumbene
Tolbar	Tolbar	Braemar Bay
Tolbar	Eucumbene	Braemar Bay
Tolbar	Nimmo	Nimmo

Eucumbene is a locality in the Snowy Monaro Regional Council in New South Wales, Australia. In the 2016 census, Eucumbene had a population of 12 people.

== Geography ==
The locality over looks Eucumbene Cove of Lake Eucumbene which is the impoundment of the Eucumbene Dam. The dam is part of the Snowy Mountains Scheme, a major Australian hydro-electricity and irrigation project.

== History ==
The locality was formerly known as Eucumbene Cove.
The former town of Eucumbene (1953 to 1966) was located approximately 2.5 kilometres to the south-east.

== Heritage listings ==
Eucumbene has a number of heritage sites, including:

- Old Adaminaby and Lake Eucumbene
