= Jessie Litchfield =

Northern Territory pioneer

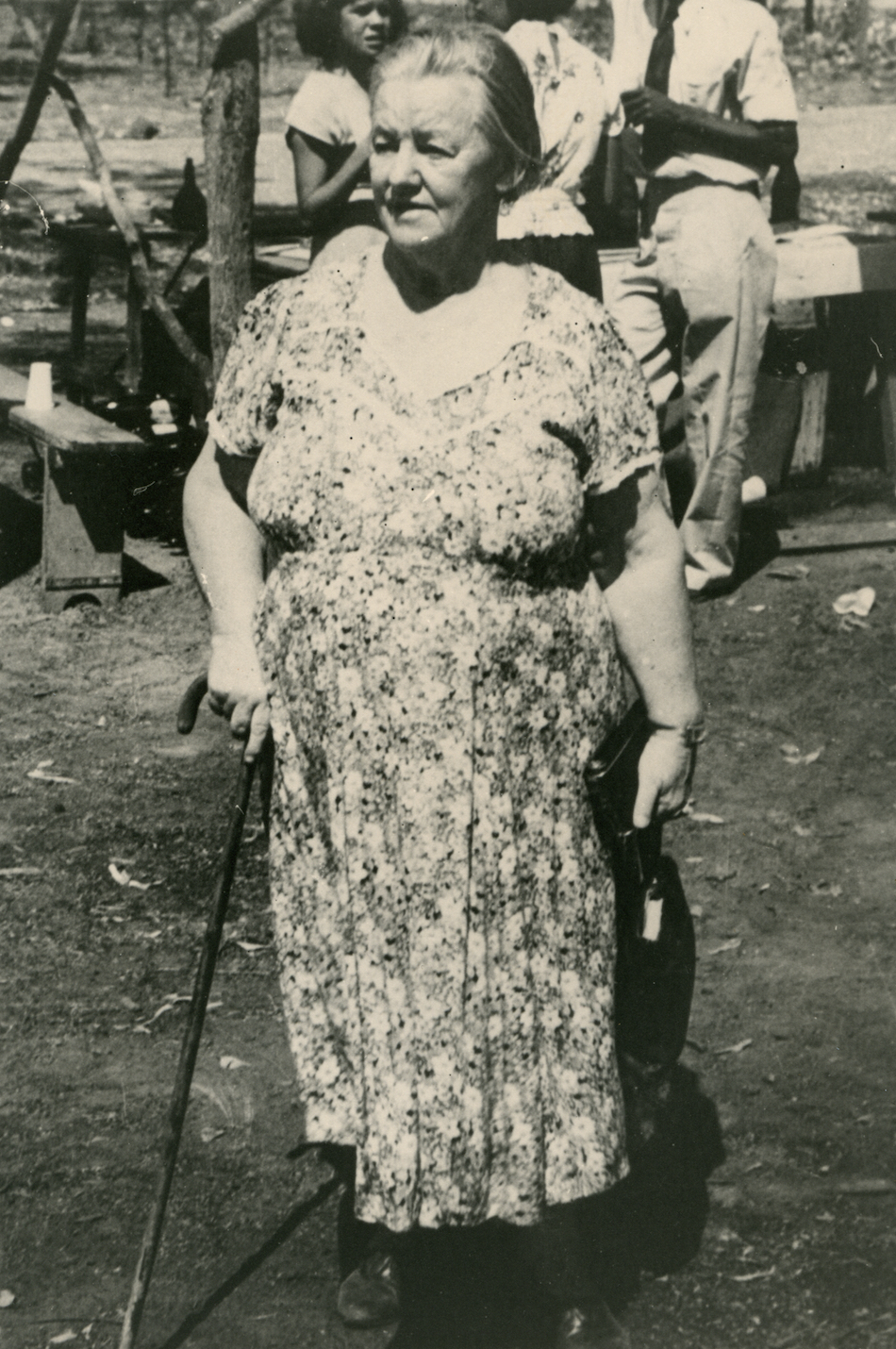
- Jessie Litchfield at the Darwin Show

Personal details
- Born: Jessie Sinclair Litchfield; 18 February 1883 Ashfield, New South Wales
- Died: 12 March 1956 (aged 57) Richmond, Victoria
- Occupation: Author

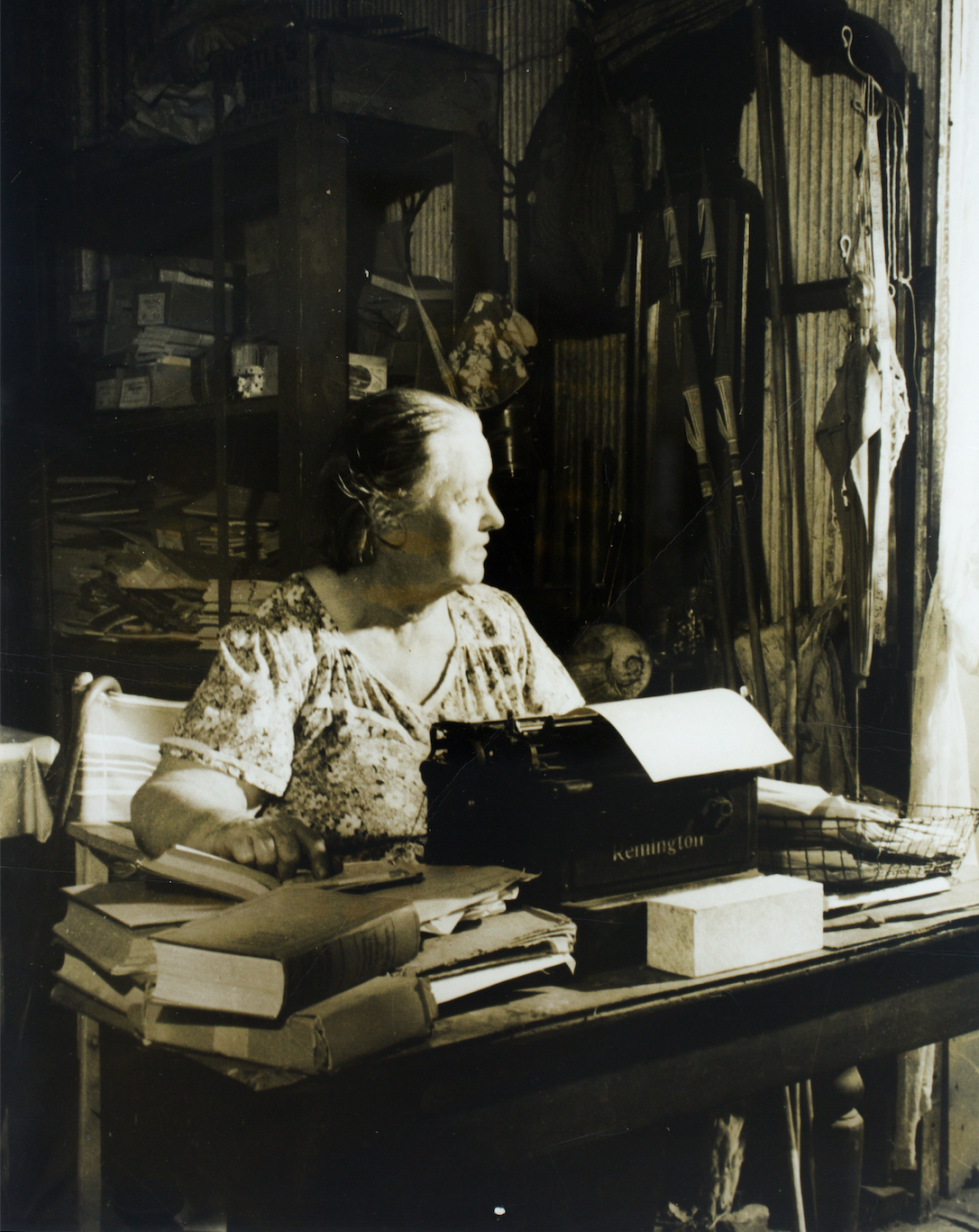
Jessie Litchfield at the typewriter

Jessie Sinclair Litchfield (18 February 1883 – 12 March 1956) was an Australian author and Northern Territory pioneer.

== Early life ==
Litchfield was born on 18 February 1883 at Ashfield to contractor John Phillips and Jean Sinclair (née Reid). Jessie was educated at Neutral Bay Public School and was taught by Mary Cameron. She married Valentine Augustus Litchfield on 21 January 1908, a miner whom she had met on a ship to Darwin. and they moved around the Northern Territory living at West Arm, Anson Bay, Brocks Creek, the Ironblow mine, the Union reefs and Pine Creek.

== Career ==
In 1909 she wrote to the Messenger, a Victorian church newspaper, describing "Chinese and blacks [as] my nearest neighbours", and her reports may have contributed to the establishment of the Australian Inland Mission.

By the time her husband died in 1931, Jessie was a mother of seven and had published Far North Memories based on her experiences. She wrote five books as well as short stories, articles, and verses, and pursued a career as a journalist, becoming editor of the Northern Territory Times and Government Gazette in 1930. The Times was purchased in 1932 by the union-owned Northern Standard, prompting many battles with the conservative Litchfield. She was Darwin press representative for many papers, including Reuters, for six years.

Litchfield was evacuated to Sydney in February 1942 and bought the Roberta Library, a small library which she then relocated and reopened in Darwin upon her return. She campaigned for self-government in the Territory and the creation of two separate states (North and Central Australia) when she contested the Northern Territory federal division in 1951 as an independent; she was then 68 years old. As a part of this campaign she hired a taxi to take her over 3000 miles (4828 km).

Litchfield was awarded the coronation medal for outstanding service to the Northern Territory in 1953, becoming its first female justice of the peace in 1955. She was involved in the founding of the North Australian Monthly in 1954.

== Correspondence ==
Litchfield correspondent with many influential people throughout her life and she was a prolific letter writer. Her personal correspondence files contain letters from Aubrey Abbott, McAlister Blain, Arthur Calwell, John Curtin, Dame Mary Gilmore, Bill Harney, Ernestine Hill, Robert Menzies, George Pearce and Norman Rockwell.

She was an advocate for Aboriginal people in the NT and once wrote in defence of traditional life in a letter to the editor of the New York Times; he had called Aboriginal Australians ‘probably the most primitive human beings in the world’.

Some of this correspondence is held by Library & Archives NT.

== Later life ==
Litchfield died at Richmond on a visit to Melbourne in 1956. She was cremated and her ashes scattered over Darwin. Her estate was placed in trust fund to encourage the development of Australia Literature through The Litchfield Award for Literature, now a part of the Northern Territory Literary Awards administered by Library & Archives NT.

Litchfield is the subject of a book by Jane Dickinson, Jessie Litchfield, grand old lady of the Territory, published in 1982. She is also the subject of a television documentary produced by Jeannine Baker, Holding a Tiger by the Tail: Jessie Litchfield (Earshot, ABC Radio National, 2015).

Litchfield Place, in the Canberra suburb of Gilmore, is named in her honour.

== Publications ==
- 1930 - Far-North memories : being the account of ten years spent on the diamond-drills, and of things that happened in those days
- 1952 - Historical review of the Northern Territory
