= Adaminaby =

- Town
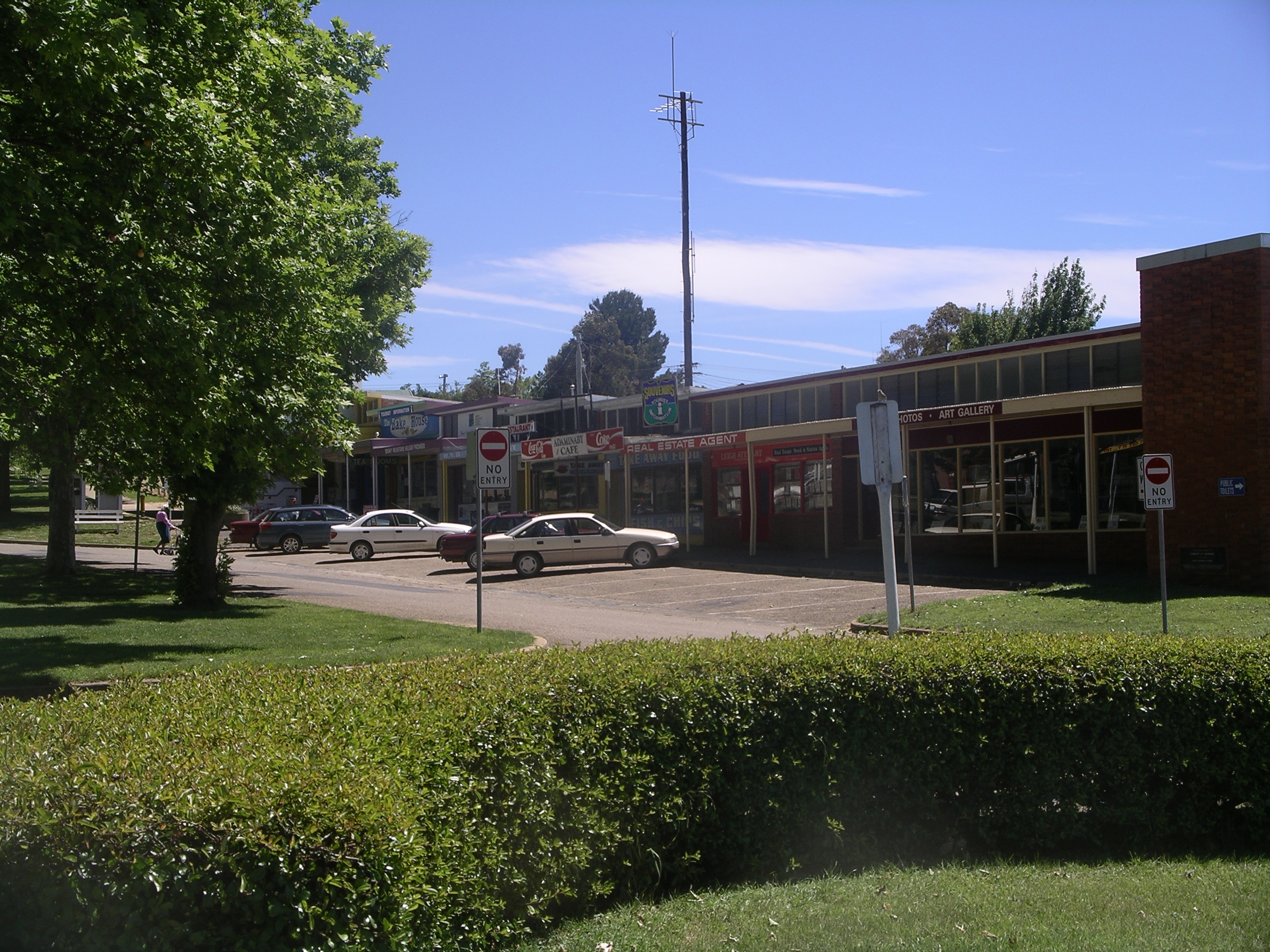
- Main street of Adaminaby, New South Wales

- Coordinates: 35°59′46″S 148°46′26″E
- Country: Australia
- State: New South Wales
- LGA: Snowy Monaro Regional Council
- Location: 402 km (250 mi) from Sydney; 140 km (87 mi) from Canberra; 52 km (32 mi) from Cooma

Government
  - State electorate: Monaro
  - Federal division: Eden-Monaro
- Elevation: 1,017 m (3,337 ft)

Population
  - Total: 339 (2021 census)
- Postcode: 2629
- County: Wallace
- Parish: Seymour
- Annual rainfall: 687.5 mm (27.07 in)
Localities around Adaminaby
Kosciuszko NP	Yaouk	Shannons Flat
Providence Portal	Adaminaby	Dry Plain
Old Adaminaby	Buckenderra	Frying Pan

Adaminaby /ædəˈmɪnəbi/ is a small town near the Snowy Mountains north-west of Cooma, New South Wales, Australia, in the Snowy Monaro Regional Council. The historic town, of 339 people at the 2021 census, is a trout fishing centre and winter sports destination situated at 1,017 metres (3,337 ft) above sea level. Economic life is built around tourism and agriculture–the town serves as a service point for Selwyn Snowfields and the Northern Skifields. It is also a popular destination for horse riders, bushwalkers, fly-fishermen and water sports enthusiasts as well as a base for viewing aspects of the Snowy Mountains Scheme.

Adaminaby is one of the highest towns in Australia, with regular snowfalls that are quite often heavy during winter. The historic Bolaro Station and scenic Yaouk Valley are located near the township and Charlie McKeahnie, said to be the inspiration for The Man From Snowy River, a poem by Banjo Paterson, lived and died in the district. Later, Nobel winning author Patrick White wrote about the town. The construction of nearby Lake Eucumbene made it necessary to re-locate the original township of (Old) Adaminaby in 1957. In times of drought, the original township and relics of the old valley re-emerge from under the waters of the lake. The present township is located on the Snowy Mountains Highway and is known as the "Home of The Big Trout" and the location of the Snowy Scheme Museum.

== History ==
=== Aboriginal history ===
The Snowy Mountains region was an important gathering point for the First Nations peoples of the Adaminaby and surrounding districts for many thousands of years, with intertribal summer meetings being held in the High Country involving up to a thousand people for feasting on the bogong moth. This practice continued until around 1865.

=== Stockmen, gold diggers, poets and skiers ===
Agriculture led to the early development of Adaminaby as a township and the Kiandra goldrush and subsequent history of skiing in the Northern Snowy Mountains opened up new opportunities for economic development. A number of noted Australian writers have found inspiration in the Adaminaby district.

==== The Man from Snowy River ====
Charlie McKeahnie's grave at Old Adaminaby cemetery. McKeahnie, an Adaminaby stockman, is said to have been the inspiration for the famous bush ballad The Man From Snowy River by Banjo Patterson.

Europeans penetrated the district from the late 1820s and Adaminaby first began to develop as an agricultural centre from the 1830s, with sheep and cattle becoming an economic mainstay.

Some historians believe that Banjo Paterson's most famous poem, "The Man from Snowy River", may have been inspired by the exploits of an Adaminaby stockman, Charlie McKeahnie. McKeahnie died in a riding accident in 1895 and is now buried in the Old Adaminaby Cemetery on the shores of Lake Eucumbene. Paterson's character, the Man From Snowy River, is most likely a composite character, based on various people involved in brumby hunts such as were conducted in the Adaminaby district.

Paterson was not the only Australian writer to find inspiration at Adaminaby – the poet Barcroft Boake also wrote about McKeahnie's ride in "On the Range", in which McKeahnie chases down a well-bred horse which had escaped with a brumby mob of wild horses; while Nobel Prize winning author Patrick White worked as a jackaroo at Adaminaby's Bolaro Station in the 1930s. His subsequent and critically acclaimed first novel, Happy Valley was inspired by his time working at Adaminaby and the people he knew in the town. It won White the 1941 Australian Society of Literature's gold medal.

==== Goldrush and skiing in northern skifields ====
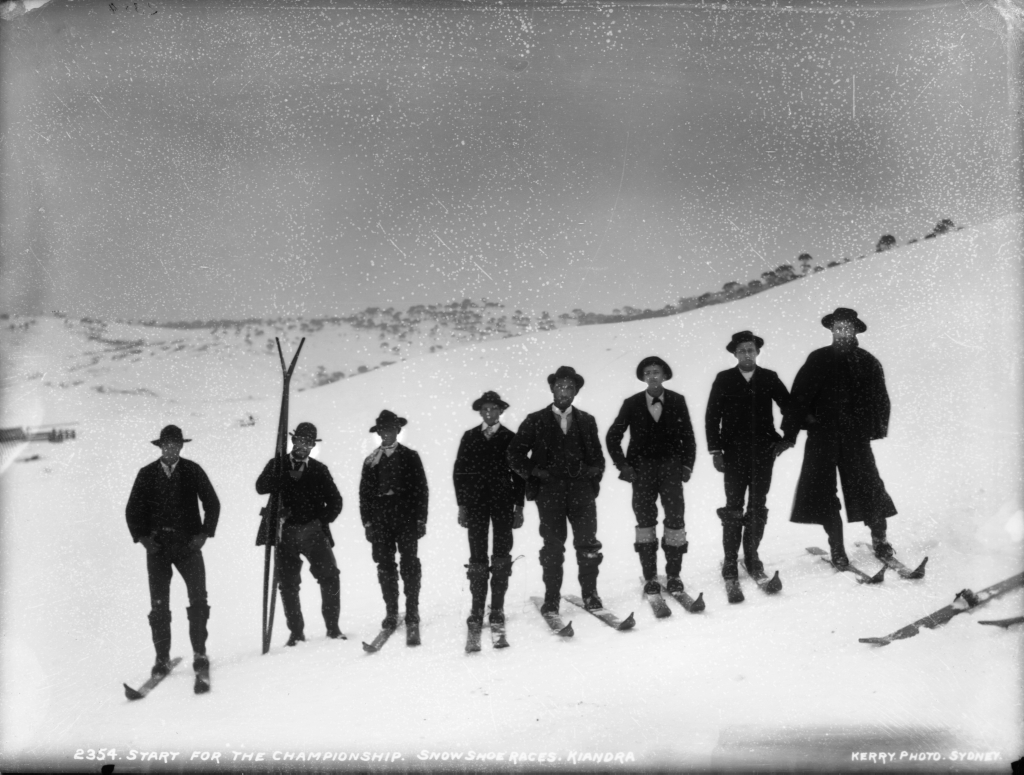
Start of championship "snow shoe" races at Kiandra in 1900. Adaminaby is the main service town for the Northern NSW skifields, where skiing in Australia began in the 1860s.

The fortunes of the town were affected by the discovery of gold at nearby Kiandra in 1859 and subsequent introduction of recreational skiing to the district around 1861, when Scandinavian gold prospectors are reputed to have strapped fence posts to their boots and slid down the snowbound hills of a landscape too frozen for mining. For around a century, Kiandra remained Australia's highest township and a base for skiers, before the last permanent residents left the township following completion of the Snowy Mountains Scheme. Kiandra's ski facilities were permanently shifted "up the hill" to Selwyn Snowfields in 1978 and Adaminaby remains the main service centre for the Northern skifields of New South Wales–one of the oldest areas for recreational skiing in the world.

Early graziers used the high country wilderness above Adaminaby as summer pastureland. The area was set aside as a National Chase in 1906 and later became the Kosciuszko National Park. Today the area is renowned for its historic huts and access to unique wilderness areas, including the Mount Jagungal Wilderness Area.

=== Snowy Mountains Scheme ===
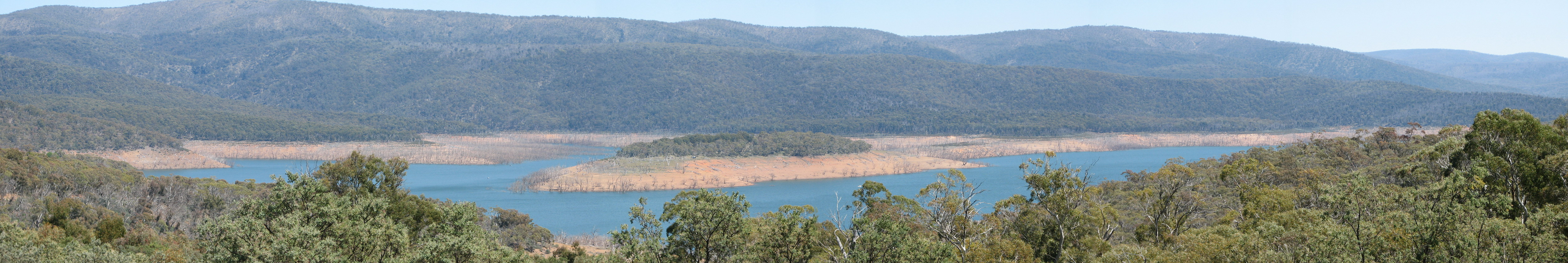
The creation of Lake Eucumbene made it necessary to re-locate the original town of Adaminaby.

==== Relocation of the original township ====
The most momentous episode in the town's history, came with the construction of the vast network of tunnels and dams of the Snowy Mountains Hydro-Electric Scheme, which began at Adaminaby in 1949. A lake nine times the volume of Sydney Harbour eventually flooded the valley in which the original townsite lay. A prolonged drought saw the ruins of the old township begin to resurface in April 2007, attracting the attention of global media – and even comparisons to the mythical city of Atlantis.

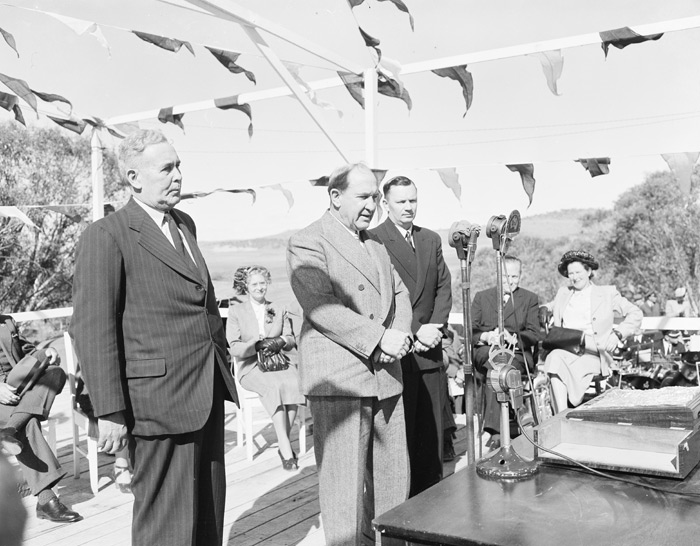
Official launch of the Snowy Mountains Scheme at Adaminaby in 1949. From the left, Prime Minister, Ben Chifley; Governor-General of Australia, William McKell and Minister for Works and Housing, Nelson Lemmon.

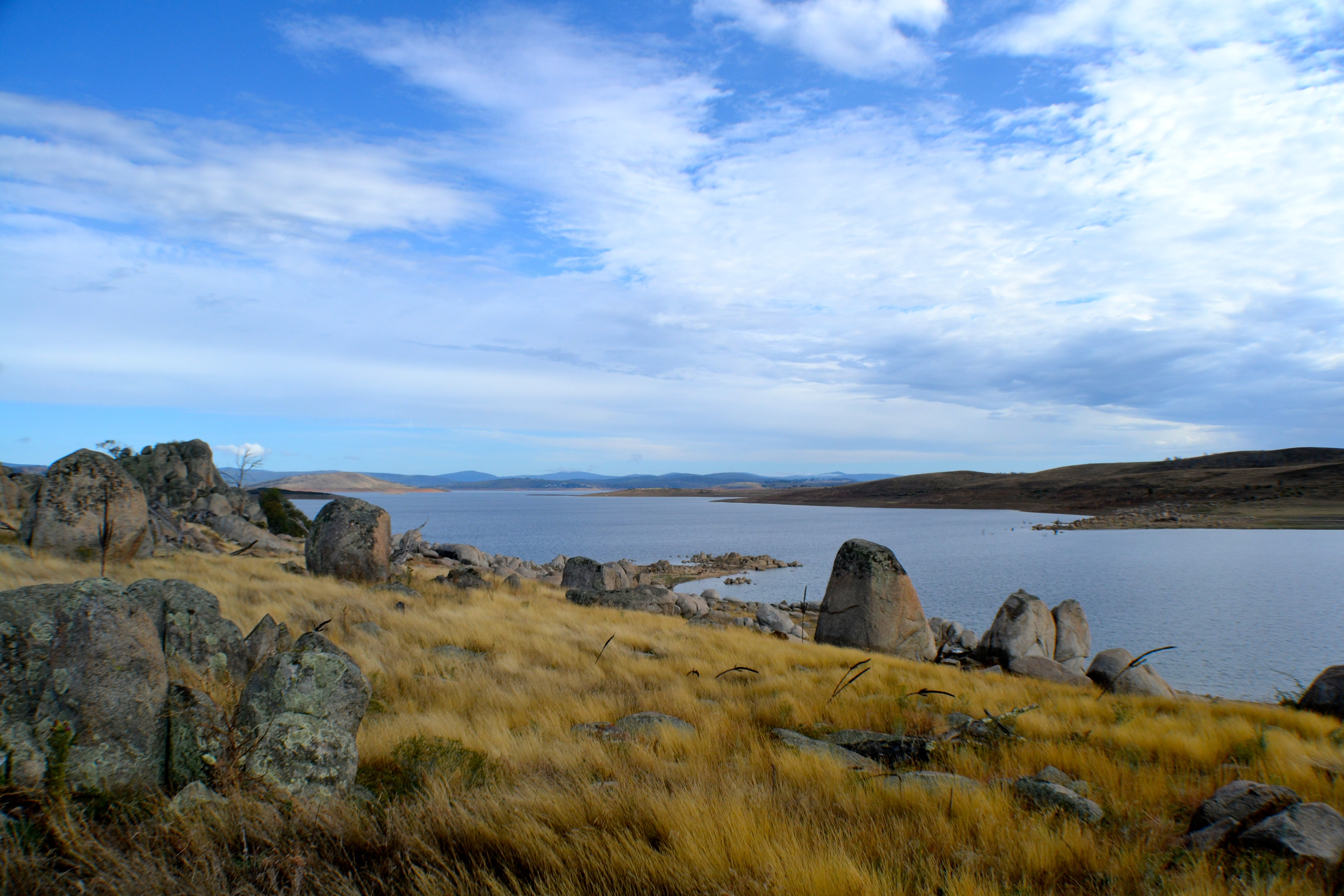
Lake Eucumbene swallowed the original township of Adaminaby, but has become a tourist drawcard for the district.

The story of Adaminaby's relocation was the subject of film produced by the Snowy Mountains Authority Film Unit in 1958, entitled "Operation Adaminaby" (to see clips click here). It was also the subject of a 2001 documentary by historian Jeannine Baker, entitled "Our Drowned Town", which screened on SBS Television. Entire houses, and even the Commercial Bank Building were transported on the back of trucks and over 100 buildings were re-erected at the new townsite. Transportation of the first house from Old Adaminaby to New Adaminaby (a distance of just 10 kilometres (6 mi) took six days. Today a tourist village has been built around the handful of buildings which were not relocated from the newly created lakeshore at Old Adaminaby.

The current town served as a construction hub during the building of the Snowy Scheme. The distinctive 1950s architecture of the buildings in the main street, defined by cost and engineering requirements of the time, is similar to the main street of Tallangatta, Victoria, which was reconstructed around the same time and for similar purposes. A Snowy Mountains Scheme Museum is planned to be constructed in the town.

Adaminaby provides access to various sites associated with the Snowy Scheme, including nearby Lake Eucumbene, Tantangara Dam, Tumut 2 Power Station and Cabramurra, Australia's highest town.

In September 2007, Adaminaby recognised the 50th anniversary of its move to the new town site. The weekend of remembrance and celebration recognised the physical and emotional trauma exacted by the relocation.

=== Development of tourism ===
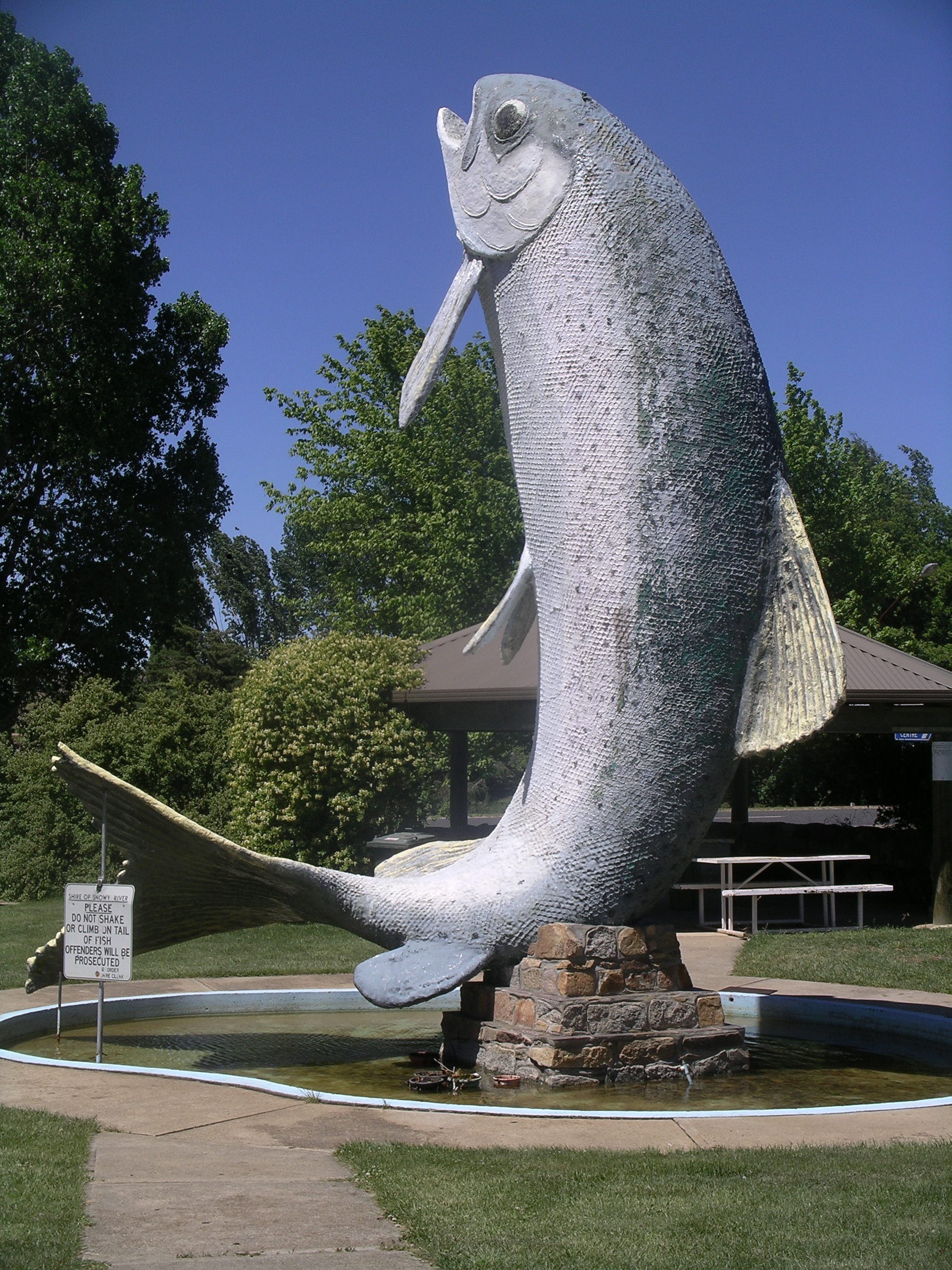
The Big Trout, Adaminaby's tribute to the fishing in Lake Eucumbene

The completion of the Snowy Mountains Scheme saw the economic life of the district settle around agriculture and tourism as major sources of income. A number of tourist villages and camping grounds have been established around Lake Eucumbene near Adaminaby, including Anglers Reach and Providence Portal. Old Adaminaby has developed as a tourist village above the site of the old township at Lake Eucumbene, and retains a handful of the original buildings of the township. The Snowgoose Hotel and Snowy Mountains Motel became longstanding providers of accommodation for skiers and fishermen visiting Adminaby, while farmstay resorts and lakeside cottages and caravan parks have been developed to take advantage of the natural environment surrounding Adaminaby. A bowling club and associated golf course and public swimming pool also service locals and tourists.

The development of Kosciusko National Park limited agricultural activities and development in the high country above Adaminaby, but preserved large wilderness areas for the protection of wildlife and enjoyment of tourists. The decline of historic Kiandra and the development of Selwyn Snowfields ensured a place for Adaminaby as a ski-hire and accommodation centre. Relics of Australian pioneer history can be found throughout the Adaminaby high country district – including a number of mountain huts and the ghost township of Kiandra – initially neglected by the National Parks and Wildlife Service but more recently the subject of extensive restoration and heritage work.

==== Home of the Big Trout ====
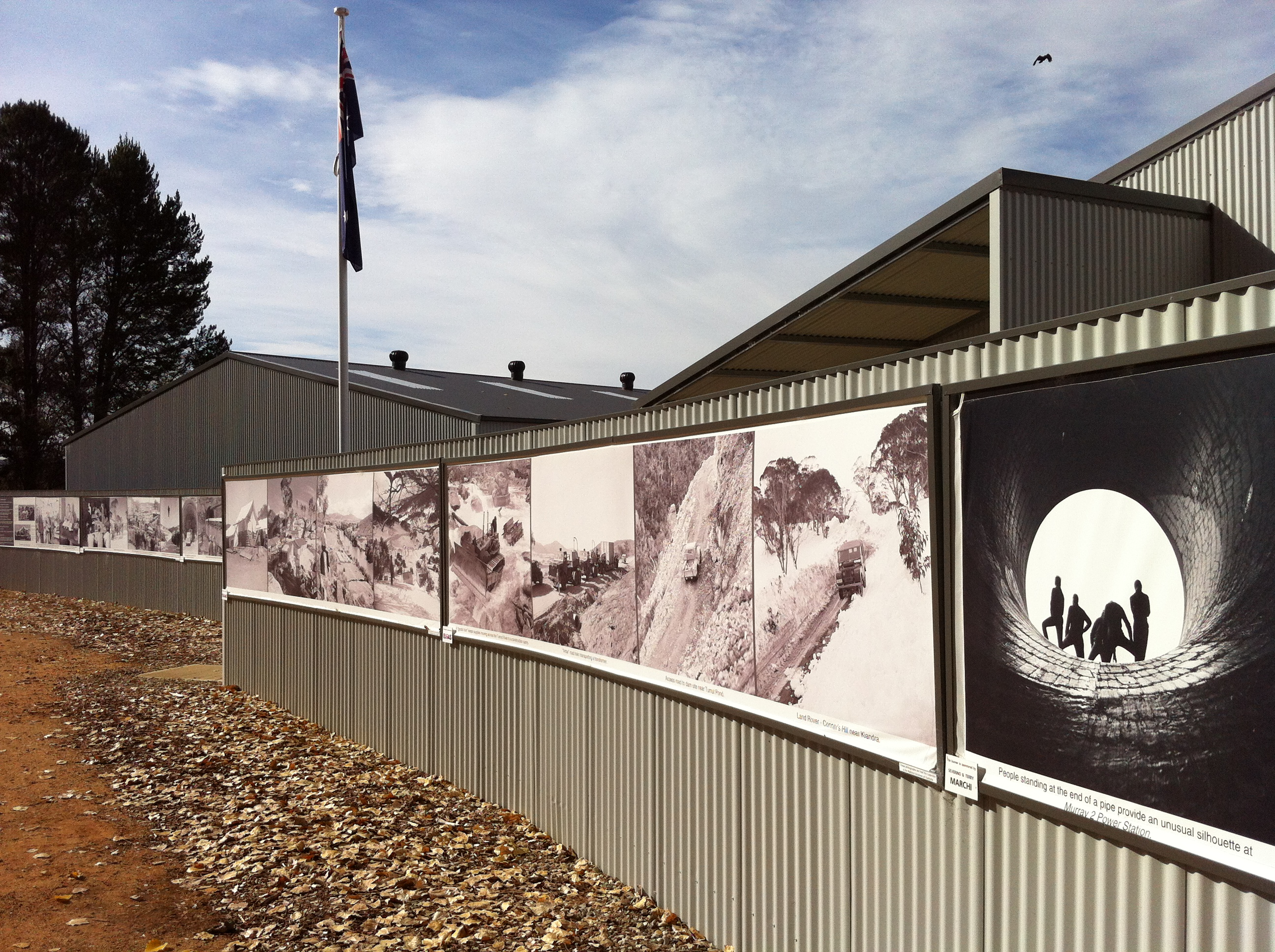
The Snowy Scheme Museum was opened by the Governor General in 2011.

The town is a popular base from which to fish on Lake Eucumbene and surrounding rivers and the town centre features a large sculpture of a trout, standing 10 metres (33 ft) high. Commonly known as the Big Trout, it was one of the earliest of Australia's Big Things and in May 2006, the lake Eucumbene Chamber of Commerce adopted the tourist attraction as a marketing and promotional 'brand'. The Big Trout was built by Andy Lomnici and was restored and repainted by Skins Alive in January 2007, with funding from the former Snowy River Shire Council.

==== Snowy Scheme Museum ====
The Snowy Scheme Museum located at Adaminaby tells the story of the construction of the Snowy Mountains Hydro Electric Scheme and what life was like on the Scheme. The collection consists of significant examples of the machines and materials used to build the Scheme. Exhibits concentrate on the stories of the Snowy workers and their impact on Australia, especially on modern Australia's migration program.

The Museum collection was gathered by enthusiasts over a ten-year period and the Museum was officially opened to the public by Governor General Quentin Bryce on 17 October 2011. Governor General Bryce told those in attendance: "It is bringing this powerful component of Australia's history into a museum, for people to come and learn the history of the Snowy, for it to be passed down to generations".

Historical population
Year	Pop.	±%
1954	523	—
1961	460	−12.0%
1966		—
1971	412	—
1976	366	−11.2%
1981	378	+3.3%
1986	283	−25.1%
1991	375	+32.5%
1996	366	−2.4%
2001	449	+22.7%
2006	234	−47.9%
2011	226	−3.4%
2016	210	−7.1%
2021	257	+22.4%
Source: Australian Bureau of Statistics data.

== Climate ==
=== Rainfall ===
The Bureau of Meteorology does not host any representative temperature data for Adaminaby, but rainfall records are found. These records (since 1886, taken from the Adaminaby Alpine Tourist Park) show rainfall peaking in spring and dipping in autumn, with a more uniform rainfall pattern than at nearby Cooma. Adaminaby's rainfall total and pattern are most similar to those of Yass.

Climate data for Adaminaby Alpine Tourist Park (1886–2022); 1,015 m AMSL; 36.00° S, 148.77° E
Month	Jan	Feb	Mar	Apr	May	Jun	Jul	Aug	Sep	Oct	Nov	Dec	Year
Average precipitation mm (inches)	59.0 (2.32)	52.7 (2.07)	56.3 (2.22)	46.7 (1.84)	47.3 (1.86)	57.8 (2.28)	53.8 (2.12)	59.7 (2.35)	60.1 (2.37)	67.8 (2.67)	59.1 (2.33)	60.5 (2.38)	687.5 (27.07)
Source: Australian Bureau of Meteorology; Adaminaby Alpine Tourist Park

Another site 20 km to the north (Yaouk, since 1969) records significantly greater rainfall due to its higher elevation and proximity to the dividing range. This site is most representative of the areas situated on and around Lake Eucumbene. Rainfall total and pattern here approach those of Khancoban and very much unlike the typical Monaro rainfall. Snow is often heaviest on the northern and western shores of Lake Eucumbene.

Climate data for Adaminaby (Yaouk, 1969–2022); 1,140 m AMSL; 35.79° S, 148.81° E
Month	Jan	Feb	Mar	Apr	May	Jun	Jul	Aug	Sep	Oct	Nov	Dec	Year
Average precipitation mm (inches)	79.0 (3.11)	73.8 (2.91)	59.1 (2.33)	50.2 (1.98)	57.8 (2.28)	81.8 (3.22)	71.1 (2.80)	90.8 (3.57)	87.4 (3.44)	73.7 (2.90)	86.3 (3.40)	81.7 (3.22)	909.9 (35.82)
Source: Australian Bureau of Meteorology; Adaminaby (Yaouk)

== Claims to fame ==
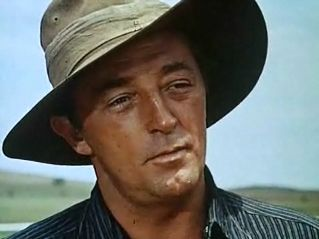
Robert Mitchum in The Sundowners, 1960

- Resting place of Charlie McKeahnie, claimed by some as the original "Man From Snowy River".
- Gateway to the Northern NSW Snowfields and Mount Selwyn – the oldest ski district in Australia, where recreational skiing has been conducted since 1861.
- Nobel Prize–winning author Patrick White's first novel, Happy Valley, was inspired by his time at Adaminaby. It was awarded the Australian Society of Literature's gold medal in 1941.
- Site where construction of the Snowy Mountains Scheme began in 1949.
- Along with Jindabyne, Talbingo and Tallangatta, Adaminaby is one of a unique collection of Australian towns which were moved to make way for dam construction.
- In 1959 Hollywood came to the newly resituated Adaminaby race course for the filming of The Sundowners, starring Robert Mitchum, Peter Ustinov, and Deborah Kerr.
- In 1984, the Adaminaby Race Track doubled for Mexico in the Australian horse-bio-pic Phar Lap, starring Tom Burlinson.
- Home of the World's Largest Trout.
- Site of the Snowy Scheme Museum

== See also ==
- List of dams and reservoirs in New South Wales
- Skiing in Australia
- Old Adaminaby and Lake Eucumbene
- Monaro (New South Wales)
