= Charlie McKeahnie =

Australian horseman

Charlie Mac's grave in Old Adaminaby cemetery

Charles Lachlan "Charlie Mac" McKeahnie (29 April 1868 – 3 August 1895) was an Australian horseman born in Gudgenby, ACT to Alexander and Mary McKeahnie into a family of five sisters. He is believed by some historians to be the inspiration for the poem "The Man from Snowy River" by Banjo Paterson.

McKeahnie was reputed to have been a fearless rider and stockman. He was known to have chased a well-bred horse through the very rugged country between Yaouk and the headwaters of the Snowy River north west of Adaminaby at the age of 17. This chase was documented in a poem by poet and friend of the McKeahnie family, Barcroft Boake called "On the Range" in which the horse being chased died when it ran into a granite outcrop. According to a letter by one of McKeahnie's sisters Lem McKeahnie, Banjo Paterson learnt of the tale in Sydney while in the presence of a friend of McKeahnie's, Mrs Jim Hassall. At the time Paterson wrote the poem, the Eucumbene River had been known as the Snowy River. The area around the upper Eucumbene and the adjacent upper Murrumbidgee was where Charlie McKeahnie had lived and worked. According to Monaro district folklore, Paterson had told somebody at the Bredbo Hotel that the poem was based on McKeahnie's ride.

McKeahnie died at the age of 27 at the Bredbo Hotel after a horse riding accident and was buried at Adaminaby cemetery. He had never married and had no known children.
