= Jeannine Baker =

Australian historian

Jeannine Baker is an Australian historian. She specialises in feminist media history and is a Lecturer in Media and Communication at the University of Newcastle, Australia.

== Life ==
Baker completed a BA in Mass Communications from Macquarie University and an MA in Public History at the University of Technology, Sydney. She completed a PhD in Australian history at the University of Melbourne in 2014. Her thesis, on Australian women war reporters during World War II, was awarded the Dennis-Wettenhall Prize for the best postgraduate thesis in Australian History. It was later published as Australian Women War Reporters: Boer War to Vietnam.

Baker has also worked as an oral history interviewer and made historical documentaries for television and radio, including Our Drowned Town (SBS TV, 2001) about the flooding of the New South Wales town of Adaminaby for the Snowy Mountains Scheme, Holding a Tiger by the Tail: Jessie Litchfield (Earshot, ABC Radio National, 2015), about the Darwin newspaper editor and journalist Jessie Litchfield. and Fler and the Modernist Impulse (Hindsight, ABC Radio National, 2011), about Melbourne furniture design firm Fler and the influence of modernism on the Australian home.

Jeannine Baker was a recipient of the International Federation of Television Archives Media Studies Grant in 2021, which she used to conduct research and publish about the role of women in early Australian television production for the National Film and Sound Archive of Australia. The project won the 2022 Media Award from Oral History Australia. Baker also co-curated the '100 Voices That Made the BBC: Pioneering Women' website for the BBC and Sussex University.

== Publications ==
- Baker, J. Australian Women War Reporters: Boer War to Vietnam. Sydney: NewSouth, 2015
- Arrow M, Baker J, and Monagle C (eds), Small Screens: Essays in Contemporary Australian Television. Melbourne: Monash University Press, 2016.
- Baker, J. (2021). The Women Who Made Australian Television: The Beginnings of Television. National Film and Sound Archive of Australia, https://www.nfsa.gov.au/latest/women-who-made-australian-television-1-beginnings-television
- Arnold, S., McCabe, J., Andrews, K., Badenoch, A., Baker, J., Ball, V., Hendriks, E., Jackson, V., Murphy, K., Sahu, I., Skoog, K., Terkanian, K., & Warner, H. (2025). Women’s broadcasting histories and the archive: National, transnational and transmedial entanglements. Critical Studies in Television, 20(2), 240-266.
