= Big Trout =

Sculpture in New South Wales, Australia

Coordinates: 35°59′50.18″S 148°46′28.34″E

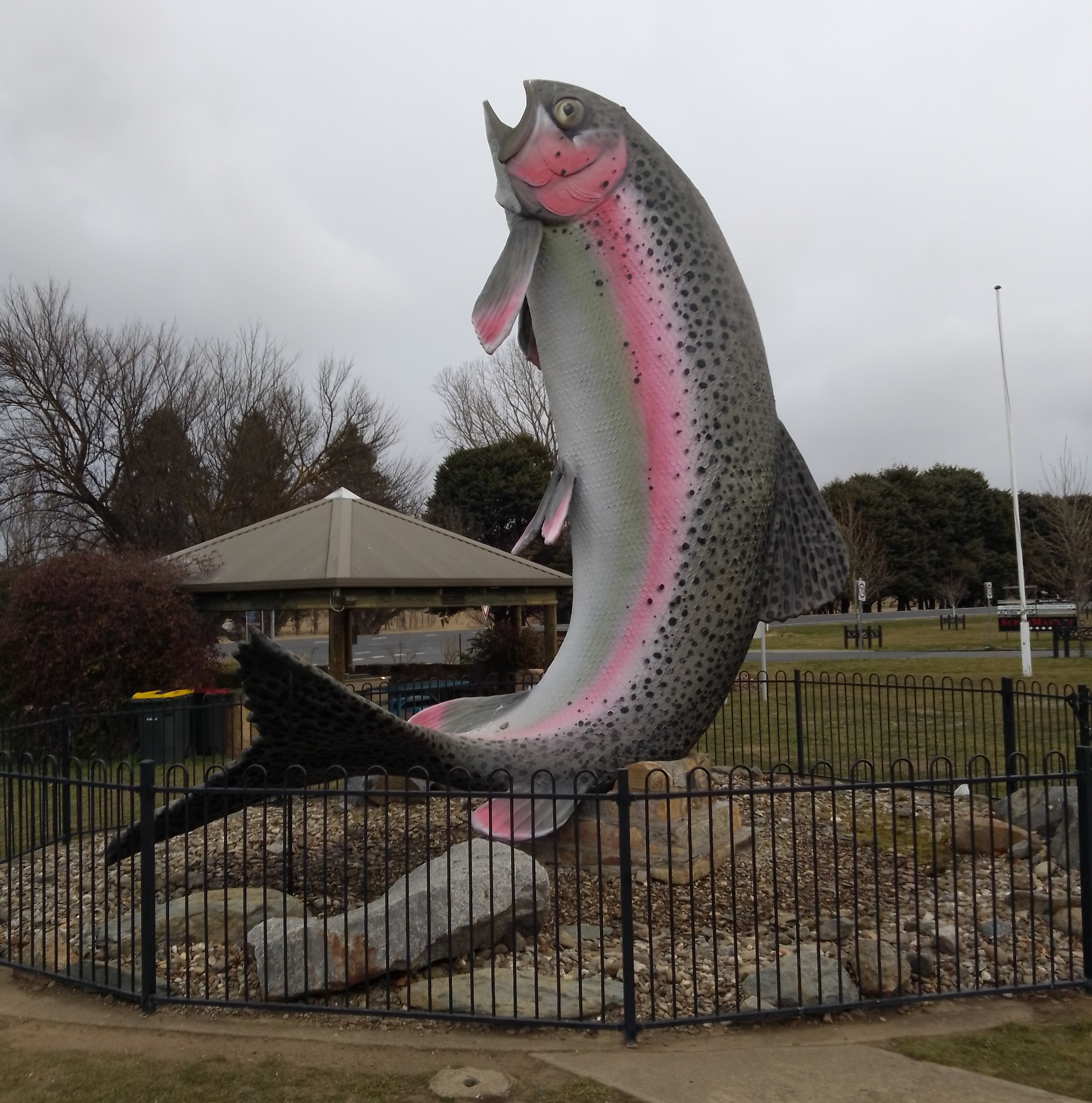
- Designer: Andy Lomnici
- Completion date: 14 January 1980
- Medium: Fibreglass over steel and mesh
- Subject: Trout
- Dimensions: 10 m (33 ft) tall
- Weight: 2.5 tonnes (2 long tons; 3 short tons)
- Location: Adaminaby, New South Wales, Australia

The Big Trout is a 10-metre-high fibreglass model in Adaminaby, New South Wales, Australia, a popular fishing spot for trout. Built in 1973 by local artist and fisherman, Andy Lomnici, the Big Trout is part of more than 1075 Big Things located throughout Australia. Originally conceived by Leigh Stewart, the Snowy Mountains Authority assisted with funding, and work on the trout started in 1971.

== Construction ==
Andy Lomnici used a frozen trout as a guide, and built the final work in fibreglass over mesh and a steel frame. The completed Big Trout stands at 10 metres (33 ft) and weighs 2.5 tonnes (2 long tons; 3 short tons). The scales were produced by covering the work in mesh, adding a final layer of fiberglass, and then removing the mesh before it set.

In 2007, the trout was repainted and restored and in 2012 the work was refurbished to celebrate the centenary of the Snowy River Shire.

== See also ==
- Australia's big things
- List of world's largest roadside attractions
