= Old Adaminaby and Lake Eucumbene =

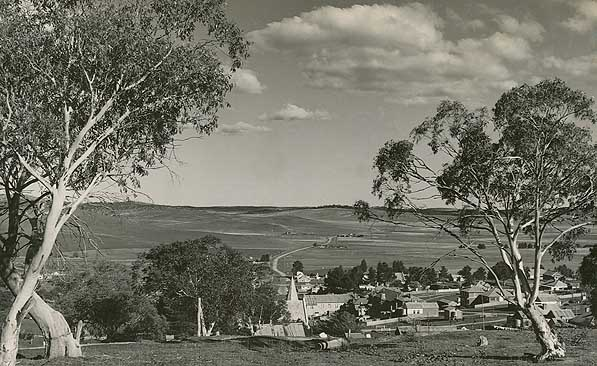
- Adaminaby, undated

- Location within New South Wales Location within Australia
- 36.0667°S 148.6954°E
- Location: Eucumbene, Snowy Valleys Council, New South Wales, Australia

History
- Built: 1956–1958 (dam)

Site notes
- Architect: Eucumbene dam: Snowy Hydro Electric Authority
- Owner: Snowy Hydro Limited

New South Wales Heritage Register
- Official name: Old Adaminaby and Lake Eucumbene, including relics and movable objects; Eucumbene River; Eucumbene Valley; Old Adaminaby Remains; Old Adaminaby Ruins; Old Adaminaby Drowned Landscape
- Type: state heritage (archaeological-terrestrial)
- Designated: 3 June 2008
- Reference no.: 1794
- Type: Townscape
- Category: Urban Area
- Builders: Eucumbene dam: Snowy Hydro Electric Authority

Old Adaminaby and Lake Eucumbene are the heritage-listed former town of Adaminaby and the reservoir that flooded the town, now at Eucumbene, Snowy Valleys Council, New South Wales, Australia. The town was established in 1830. The reservoir was designed by the Snowy Hydro Electric Authority and built from 1956 to 1958 by the Authority. It is also known as Old Adaminaby and Lake Eucumbene, including relics and movable objects, Eucumbene River, Eucumbene Valley, Old Adaminaby Remains, Old Adaminaby Ruins and Old Adaminaby Drowned Landscape. The property is owned by Snowy Hydro Limited, a statutory corporation owned by the governments of Australia, New South Wales and Victoria. The site was added to the New South Wales State Heritage Register on 3 June 2008.

== History ==
=== Indigenous history ===
The Ngarigo people occupied the country from Canberra south to just below the NSW/Victorian border, west to Tumbarumba and east to the coast. This group name is that of the plains turkey or Australian bustard, Ardeotis australis, which was common on the Monaro grasslands before the arrival of Europeans. The Ngarigo tribe is made up of a number of individual clans, each of which has rights and responsibilities to a particular part of the country. They are generally named after a local plant, animal or landscape feature which characterises that country and this name plus the suffix -gal identifies the people of that area. The Bemerangal had responsibility for the area which now includes the towns and villages of Adaminaby, Bredbo, Numeralla, Cooma and Jindabyne. The Bemerangal seasonally travelled to and from the coast, through the country of relatives, along traditional travel routes which took them down the Tuross River to Bodalla. The highest mountains were not the country of any specific group but were sites of important secret meetings and ceremonies in which qualified individuals from many neighbouring groups took part. Major camps were established in areas such as Jindabyne and Adaminaby where the groups assembled for summer hunting and gathering and also preparation for the mountain ceremonies. The flooding of the Eucumbene and Jindabyne valleys has hidden many of these campsites. However the large numbers of stone tools which can be seen around the edges of the lakes indicate that many camps were established higher up the valley sides to escape cold air drainage in the valleys. The arrival of Europeans led to the deaths of many of the people through disease and violence and most were gradually forced off their country. Some remained working on properties so that they could try to care for their country, others settled elsewhere or were forced on to Aboriginal reserves.

=== Pastoral Settlement, 1827–1957 ===
Richard Brooks, the first European settler to the Monaro, attracted by the vast areas of open, treeless countryside, brought cattle grazing to the Eucumbene valley and Adaminaby Plain in 1827. By 1831 he had been joined by William Faithfull and Captain Joseph Thompson. The census taken in 1839 by the Commissioner of Crown Lands for the Monaro District recorded a handful of settlements around the Eucumbene River, including Charles York and Henry Cosgrove in the vicinity of the area that became the town of Adaminaby. In 1848 York and Cosgrove applied for the Adumindumee run of 6,730 hectares (16,640 acres). George Young Mould, a physician from Edinburgh who had arrived in Sydney in 1840, reached the Monaro district in 1846. In 1853 he took up acreage, establishing his property Boconnoc in the Eucumbene valley. He also established one of the first stores in the earliest township of Old Adaminaby in 1862. In 1866 he built Boconnoc homestead which the Mould family continued to occupy until the Snowy Hydro Electric Authority (the Authority) acquired it in the 1950s. In the second half of the nineteenth century significant pastoral enterprises developed in the Eucumbene valley. With good grazing land available and proximity to the town of Old Adaminaby, the area became well populated by a thriving community living and working on small and large pastoral holdings. Other families in the district who farmed the land for generations were the Herberts, Reynolds, Mackays, Delanys, McPhies and Haslingdens. Some of the earliest properties were established at Old Adaminaby, Eucumbene, Frying Pan and Buckenderra. In the twentieth century others such as Studlands, Wainui, Warwick and Hemsby were built up. Along the Eucumbene River most pastoral holdings were on the eastern side of the river where the country was an open, undulating plain. Some grazing was carried out on the western side but land there was more treed, rocky and rugged. Traditionally, lower pastures were used for winter grazing and stock were taken to higher country for summer grazing on what became known as the "snow leases". The lease season was from 1 December to 31 May and it was a race to get stock up there to claim the best pastures. The lives of these stockmen, their horses and horsemanship has become one of Australia's most significant legends. Transhumance was an important practice for the pastoralists of the Snowy Mountains.

=== Development of the town of Old Adaminaby, 1859–1949 ===
Charles York had left the Adaminaby area by 1859, leaving his property in the hands of his three stockmen who lived in a small group of huts on the eastern side of the Eucumbene valley, overlooking the river. In 1858 that there was only one homestead between Cooma and Adaminaby, which was Mr Harnett's Eucumbene. The discovery of gold at nearby Kiandra in 1859 led to a sudden influx of miners travelling the tracks from Cooma or Jindabyne, all of whom passed by the little group of slab and bark buildings on their way to the Eucumbene river crossing. The little settlement became a staging post for travellers during the Kiandra gold rush. In 1860, one of York's stockmen, Joseph Chalker, built the first hotel in the hamlet, directly opposite his original hut. A post office was also established, with two stores following in 1861and 1862 in the hamlet that was initially known as Chalker's. A village was surveyed and noted in the NSW Government Gazette in 1861, when it was renamed Seymour by the surveyor (the maiden name of his wife). That year the first blocks of land were sold, the first purchaser being Joseph Chalker. Sparked by the Kiandra gold rush, the town continued to grow steadily and by 1877 its population of 400 supported three hotels and three stores.

In 1886 the name was altered to Adaminaby (to avoid confusion with Seymour in Victoria). Adaminaby became a thriving small town supported by local pastoralists and travellers crossing the high ranges. In 1892 there were five general stores, two butchers, a baker and two blacksmiths. A butter factory was built in 1895 and a stone court house in 1895. By the beginning of the 20th century a picture theatre, five general stores, a racecourse and a showground had been established and there was a ball each Friday night and a dance on Saturday nights. The Kyloe Copper Mine boosted the town's economy and Adaminaby was starting to look as if it would rival Cooma in size.

By the 1920s Adaminaby could boast a watchmaker, cafes and tea rooms, a cabinet maker, a local paper, a hospital, a doctor, two schools, a showground and a racecourse. The population during the 1940s was 750, although the town also provided for hundreds of people living in the nearby rural areas.

Over original Adaminaby's century of life the town grew but changed little and never had modern amenities. There was no connection to the electricity grid, water supply or sewerage system. People supplied their own light, usually kerosene lamps and candles and a number of businesses had diesel generators. Rain water was collected in tanks and some people had wells. Cans were collected weekly from the outside dunnies. Residents remember it as a close-knit, happy community where the winters were "harsh, cold, wet and windy" and heavy snowfalls were a regular occurrence.

=== Roads and bridges ===
In the mid 1850s a better road system was required for rural areas and local communities agitated for properly made roads and bridges to be built to cross creeks and rivers instead of having to rely on punts and unreliable causeways. Financial constraints resulted in most bridges being simply designed and made of hardwood. For long spans a timber laminated arch had to be built which was difficult construct and costly to maintain.

The truss system, which developed from ancient timber roof truss designs, proved to be a good option. The first truss system used in Australia, known as the Old PWD Truss, was soon recognised as having some intrinsic problems, such as sourcing the large timber sections required.

In 1879 John A. McDonald, one of the first specialist bridge engineers to join the PWD (Public Works Department), started designing a new timber truss bridge which was easier and less costly to build, cheaper to maintain and with greater carrying capacity. His design became known as the McDonald Truss which differentiated McDonald bridges from later truss designs, such as the Allan Truss and the DeBurgh Truss. According to the NSW Roads & Traffic Authority between 1886 and 1893, 91 McDonald Truss bridges were built. Newspapers reported a McDonald Truss bridge was built over the Snowy River at Jindabyne in 1893.

The Six Mile Bridge, across the Eucumbene River, is believed to have been constructed about the same time as the Jindabyne bridge and, similarly, is a McDonald type truss design.

The bridge served its purpose for half a century until it was partly demolished in 1957. The trusses were removed and the bridge was expected to collapse but it didn't fall down as predicted. A fire was started in an effort to burn it down but again the bridge resisted. The structure remained standing while the waters rose around it.

Roads had sprawled out across the country side linking farms and settlements as circumstance required. In the early days there was little official planning and well worn tracks developed into roads. Adaminaby was at the junction of roads coming from Cooma and Jindabyne and the main road that travelled up the mountains to Kiandra and across the range. When the Eucumbene River was dammed these old routes were cut, isolating some communities from others and disrupting social and commercial interaction.

=== Industrial development ===
Growth of the Adaminaby township was stimulated by two major mining booms. First was the gold rush to Kiandra, about 30 km west of Old Adaminaby, which began in 1859 and only lasted a few years. Thousands of miners travelled along the one track that passed through the original township of Old Adaminaby.

Despite some lucrative finds, the harsh environment and diminishing returns resulted in Kiandra's once populous gold field being suddenly deserted after 1860. By August 1863, following another severe winter, it was reported that the township was "tenantless" and the buildings were "falling into decay".

In 1900 a gold dredging company commenced operations on the Kiandra plain with some reasonable results. Their activities lasted for three years until the site was deemed worked out and the dredging equipment moved over the range to Tumbarumba.

At the same time as the 1860s Kiandra gold rush, copper was discovered at Kyloe, across the Eucumbene River from old Adaminaby. A shaft was sunk in 1872 but after a few attempts at obtaining ore the mine was abandoned. No real work proceeded until 1901 when Litchfield and Hassal extracted 30 short tons (27 t) of copper. The Shaeffer Bros took over the lease in 1904 and, in the next three years, sent some 500 short tons (450 t) of ore to a smelting company. The Shaeffers sold the mine to the Kyloe Mining Company in 1907 and work began to improve the site, extend the shaft and build furnaces and other facilities to enable processing.

With all the extra business and activity associated with copper mining, Adaminaby became a thriving centre. By 1910 there were 110 men and boys employed at the Kyloe mine. This number quickly expanded to 195 including those who carted the ore to Cooma and teams who provided timber for the furnaces. Electric light was provided at the site so mining could go on 24 hours a day. There were a number of houses although it would seem most men slept in tents. The ore had to go through a series of complicated processes requiring a lot of machinery.

In 1910 a huge 23-short-ton (21 t) boiler was sent by train from Sydney to Cooma and then dragged by a team of 76 bullocks to the mine site. Five bullock drivers were employed as well as a number of other men whose jobs were to dig the wheels out of bogs, build up roads and move sleepers which had to be placed on soft ground. Going was very slow and the first day from Cooma they only progressed .8 km. The boiler took six weeks to complete the journey of 50 kilometres (31 mi). The boiler and other improvements resulted in increased copper production and employment of more men. In 1911 there were 30 school age children living at the mining site and a school was established.

But by April 1913 the payable ore had been worked out and, despite further prospecting, the Kyloe mine was abandoned. The company transferred their operations to a mine at Tenterfield which they also called Kyloe. The boiler was dismantled and believed to have been hauled to one of the local sawmills, possibly Alpine Creek, in one day. At first the waters of Lake Eucumbene obliterated most of the Kyloe mining site, but many relics have reappeared as water levels have decreased.

=== The Snowy Scheme 1949–73 ===
Taking advantage of melted snow and diverting the waters of the Snowy River was first discussed in the middle of the 19th century after Australia's new pastoralists had experienced a succession of droughts and had begun to acknowledge how dry the continent really was. One of the first schemes conceived, in 1884, was to divert the Snowy into the Murrumbidgee River and send water north to Lake George which could become a massive reservoir. Interest in the idea fluctuated according to the seasons.

Power shortages during World War I lead to a proposal to use the Snowy River's waters to generate hydro electricity and supplement Sydney's power stations. The NSW government carried out surveys assessing the viability of the plan and this developed into a scheme which would also send water to augment Sydney's supplies as well as the supplies of towns and villages along the route. Other districts then made claim for water and power and finally, in 1940, a detailed study of the potential of a hydro-electricity scheme was undertaken by the NSW Government.

The resulting proposal was for a scheme which would supply both water and power and in 1949 the Commonwealth Government passed the Snowy Mountains Hydro Electric Power Act. The Scheme was considered the greatest engineering feat of its time and is still rated as one of the world's greatest engineering achievements being compared with similar major hydro-electric works in Canada and the US and projects like the Suez Canal and Panama Canal.

The Scheme comprised two main parts i) The Snowy Murray Development, which involved the diversion of the Snowy River, and ii) the Snowy-Tumut Development, which involved the diversion and damming of the Eucumbene River. This water storage was initially called Adaminaby Dam, Reservoir or Storage and was seen as the heart of the Snowy Mountains Scheme. The name was then changed to Eucumbene Dam, now known as Lake Eucumbene.

In mid October 1949 a ceremony was held near old Adaminaby, in a deep gorge on the Eucumbene River, where the Governor General, Sir William McKell, set off an explosive charge in the presence of the Prime Minister, Ben Chifley, Sir William Hudson, (later to become the first commissioner of the Snowy Mountains Hydro-electric Authority), and other dignitaries and their wives. 1,200 guests attended the ceremony, including nearly everyone from the old town. The site was near the proposed dam wall where a commemorative plaque was erected.

Originally the dam waters were to rise to just below the town and only some of the buildings were to be removed and relocated to higher ground. In June 1953 the Australian Geographical Walkabout Magazine reported that the dam was only going to be near Adaminaby and that the town would have the advantage of being sited at the edge of a large and attractive lake.

A major road was built to carry heavy earthmoving equipment from Adaminaby down to the river, a construction township established and work began on the dam site while preparations were being made for a diversion tunnel. However, further investigations were carried out and it was found that building the dam wall some 6 kilometres (3.7 mi) further down the Eucumbene Valley would enable the dam to hold a far greater volume of water and even though there were substantially increased costs these were partly off-set by a decrease in the length of the tunnel to Tumut. The dam wall was built at the new location and works for the additional capacity were completed in 1967. Following the increased capacity of the dam, the ceremonial plaque ended up a number of metres under water.

There were 120 camp sites established during the course of building the Snowy Scheme. Some were in the Eucumbene valley and four of these are now below the high water mark of the lake. They are Adaminaby Portal Camp near the original dam wall site, Adaminaby Transit Camp established near the old town between the school and the sawmill, Coles's Camp on the west side of the river near an old swing on what had been the Coles's property and Eucumbene Portal camp which was built for contractors.

The first to be constructed, in 1949, was Adaminaby Portal camp at Addicumbene where barracks and huts were erected about 6 km upstream from the current dam. This was abandoned in 1953 as the new dam wall was constructed and a more permanent camp was set up at Eaglehawk near the dam wall.

=== Relocating Adaminaby 1956–57 ===
The new dam meant that the Eucumbene valley, the Adaminaby Plain and most of the town of Adaminaby would be flooded, a total area of about 24,500 hectares (61,000 acres), resulting in the loss of homes, businesses and properties. Valuable grazing land, which produced fat cattle, fat lambs and high priced wool, was to be submerged. Questions arose regarding adequate compensation for all the years of work taken to develop businesses and properties as well as the loss of homes where several generations of families had lived. Most residents of the town and valley did not want to move. There was talk that the forced acquisition of land and businesses was illegal and some people agitated to commence legal action against the Authority. Graziers around Jindabyne and Adaminaby, who would be affected by the proposed dams, formed the Graziers Protection Association and sought legal opinion from Sir Garfield Barwick who advised that the Snowy Mountains Hydro-Electric Power Act was invalid.

The Authority, which was treated with suspicion, was keen to avoid litigation. They met with the Graziers Protection Association and came to an agreement to buy land based on current market rates, with a potential of a lease back for 3 years to allow graziers time to find replacement properties. Surprisingly the acquisitions were carried out with little friction and limited legal action. Most graziers moved away from the area because there was virtually no land available for purchase at that time. Professor Denis Winston, the Authority's town planner, was commissioned to draw up a new town and the people were given the choice of three locations, one of which looked over the new lake incorporating what was left of the old town. Surprisingly, the inhabitants chose a location on the main road, known as Bolairo View, forfeiting any water views, arguing that the position would ensure the town had a secure future on the highway and that the site was warmer, being 120 metres (390 ft) lower, and more sheltered.

In January 1954 the residents endorsed Adaminaby's new location in a referendum. This was the Authority's first experience of relocating a community which had been established a century earlier. There were people in the town and district who had never been to Cooma, let alone a big city. Families had lived, worked and developed businesses in the town and surrounding rural areas for generations. In the 1950s Adaminaby comprised a main street lined with Victorian buildings including some graceful two-storeyed verandahed shops and hotels and a number of single-storey colonial stores. There were houses and cottages dating back to the mid-Victorian era and many masonry buildings indicating that people had built to stay. It was virtually no different to other Australian rural towns which had the support of a strong local rural economy. After a century of development, the town and established community were uprooted and relocated. The Authority was aware that this relocation was a very sensitive issue with residents and took great care to make it as easy as possible and avoid any legal issues. If people wanted to move elsewhere the Authority bought their property at market value and gave them an allowance for moving. If they wanted to relocate their buildings to the new town, the Authority was prepared to pay for all relocation costs and temporary accommodation. If people wanted to move into a new building the Authority supplied one, although if it was larger than their original then payments had to be made.

The Authority built the new township of Adaminaby comprising a modern shopping centre, hotel, theatre, two schools, sporting clubs and facilities, a race course and a show ground. Thousands of trees were planted, roads built, allotments created and modern services provided to all the new blocks. Houses in the old town did not have electricity, water or sewerage and some older residents claimed that they did not want to be connected to these services. The first house relocation took place in 1956 and within 18 months all the buildings to be relocated had been removed. Weatherboard buildings were slowly transported across the countryside. There were reports of problems with wet weather and snow and some structures encountering mishaps along the way. People found they had to borrow money for the first time in their lives to pay for larger houses allocated to them with electricity and water connected. Two brick and stone churches were dismantled and rebuilt. 102 buildings were removed from Old Adaminaby, most to the new town. One notable legal case was pursued by Geoff Yen, whose family had been in town since the 1860s. He refused to cooperate and sign a contract for the new buildings the Authority was offering as compensation for his old buildings. Legal action ensued for thirty years until the Authority agreed to drop the case and Yen agreed to withdraw despite receiving nothing. The inundation affected most of the township except for four buildings that were located higher up the hill and allowed to stay in situ and the cemetery, sited on a hill, overlooking the old town.

Organisations interested in preserving Australia's heritage, such as the National Library, were dismayed when virtually no efforts were taken to record the town, collate historical records and salvage items of cultural value. Many significant items and places were destroyed when the Authority bulldozed historic cottages which were not considered to be good enough to relocate. Construction of Eucumbene Dam was completed in 1958, the first and largest in the series of 16 dams comprising the Snowy Scheme. The Authority demolished homesteads and sheds at Old Adaminaby and in the surrounding districts which were going to be under water and sold the materials to other graziers for farm buildings. Some buildings that were considered too old and worthless to be useful were bulldozed. Even though the town's street pattern was still visible the original town resembled a heap of rubble with a few surviving chimneys and stone walls. By the end of 1959 water had risen to the outskirts of town. The flooding of the town and valley was a traumatic time for local residents. There was a great deal of bitterness and resentment regarding the destruction of cherished homes and farms as well as the breakdown of old social connections and affiliations. These feelings are still evident in the community today. Most farming families were reluctant to leave their properties and some stayed until water was lapping at their doorsteps. The Authority warned that the lake could rise quite quickly and people found they had to abandon all sorts of items such as stoves and farm equipment when the water cut off-road access to their properties.

Lake Eucumbene finally reached capacity in 1973 but when the Snowy Scheme became fully operational the level was dropped to 20 metres (66 ft) lower. A number of negative impacts resulted from the flooding. The new town of Adaminaby was cut off from traditional routes to Jindabyne, Cooma and Berridale. A lot of good quality grazing land was lost and jobs were affected by the decrease. It is estimated that half the population of the town and immediate district left due to lack of job opportunities. The old town blocks were often 3 or 4 hectares (7.4 or 9.9 acres), where a family could keep a cow or a horse, but the new blocks were only a suburban quarter acre. The other town to be submerged by the Scheme was Jindabyne on the banks of the Snowy River with 250 residents. It had started as a good place for a cattle crossing the river and, during the 1840s, an inn and a water driven flourmill was built. A McDonald Truss timber bridge was constructed across the Snowy River in 1893 which encouraged the town to expand. When it came time to abandon original Jindabyne and relocate the residents, the Authority had learned from its previous experience with Adaminaby and put in place a simpler process, giving residents little input into the selection of their new town site. At the same time the Authority involved the townspeople in the design of the town and undertook a systematic collation of historical records and items of cultural heritage. The site chosen overlooked newly created Lake Jindabyne. No buildings were relocated to the new town. People were given plenty of warning about the relocation and no new houses were built in the old town for some years. Residents starting moving long before the rising water threatened their homes and businesses. The whole process was undertaken in a far more positive spirit than that which had been engendered at Adaminaby.

=== Lake Eucumbene, 1957 to present ===
The lake provided good opportunities for water sports and a number of tourism ventures were established around its shores. It was also stocked with trout and became a popular fishing location boosted by its proximity to the Murrumbidgee River, already well known by anglers. Several areas around the lake were set aside for holiday cabins. An unforeseen occurrence was that native animals were trapped on islands with the water rising around them. People remember the islands covered with kangaroos and seething with snakes. There were some efforts to relocate the kangaroos but reports were that success was limited. Sir Edward Hallstrom, benefactor and active trustee of Sydney's Taronga Park Zoo, together with Sir William Hudson, established a kangaroo refuge on one of the islands in Lake Eucumbene, not far from the dam wall. Hallstrom Island, as it became known, was primarily for the seven albino kangaroos which he donated but there were also some Great Eastern Grey kangaroos there as well. The Authority promoted the island, as well as Grace Lea Island which was a refuge for kangaroos and emus, as tourist attractions and people could take a launch from Old Adaminaby over to the islands, feed the animals, continue to the dam wall and then return to Old Adaminaby. The refuges were closed down in 1987 after many animals were killed illegally by shooters and an attempted relocation resulted in the death of many others. There were other tours around the lake and, at one stage, regular bus trips up Happy Jacks Road to visit the Queen's Lookout and appreciate the lake scenery. The Eucumbene Tea House was established, overlooking the lake and dam wall, which became a major attraction but burnt down in the late 1980s. Since 1996 the Monaro and the Alpine region have experienced a prolonged and serious drought. Precipitation has been lower than at any time on record and snow levels are only medium to low owing to generally higher temperatures and fewer moisture- bearing clouds. The 2007 snow melt was the lowest on record. It is anticipated that only minimum water releases will be allowed into the Murray River for irrigation in 2008 which is expected to reduce dam levels yet again. The low water line has attracted passing sightseers but has decreased the number of fishermen. The caravan parks were virtually empty in the middle of 2007 when Eucumbene Lake levels were at their lowest. During the early 1980s lake levels were quite depleted and many artefacts appeared as the water receded. At that time there were no reports of interference or removal. This was not the case in the first six months of 2007 when there were numerous reports of large objects, such as sulkies, drays and farm machinery, as well as an entire stone-and-brick house at Braemar Bay, being removed. In the early part of 2007 the community became alarmed about the continuing removal of objects and agitated for some action to be taken. The Snowy River Shire requested that an Interim Heritage Order be made over Lake Eucumbene to prohibit interference with the site or relics. The Interim Heritage Order was gazetted for 12 months on 4 June 2008. Council erected signs on the foreshores alerting the public to the fact that Lake Eucumbene was a heritage site and that removing or damaging any relics was an offence punishable by law with the possibility of fines up to $1.1 million.

== Description ==
The remains of Old Adaminaby, which lie on the floor of Lake Eucumbene, fall into five categories, each group being represented by a number of relics:

1. Old Adaminaby – brick & stone building foundations, domestic ephemera, car chassis, brick pit, exotic plantings
2. Pastoral – homestead foundations, farming machinery, fence posts, exotic plantings, gardens, graves
3. Industrial – mining infrastructure, slag heap, shafts, boiler, machinery, Waterous boiler
4. Roads & Bridges – main roads, tracks, Six Mile Bridge
5. Snowy Scheme – camp site foundations, rubbish dumps, car chassis, discarded domestic and work items, tunnel spoil.

=== Old Adaminaby ===
When the lake waters rose to engulf the remains of the original town of Adaminaby all things perceived to have had value, at that time, had been removed, leaving only abandoned and useless objects. Bulldozers had flattened many of the old buildings believed to be too fragile and dilapidated to move. Masonry relics such as concrete slabs, bricks and stones, indicate the location of many buildings, old vehicles, stoves and general household items left behind after the move that were covered with water. Many moveable relics have been pilfered, although piles of rubble, remnants of building foundations and other masonry relics remain that indicate specific building sites and street layouts. Depending on lake levels, former inhabitants of Old Adaminaby have been able to identify the steps of St Mary's Church on Denison Street, foundations of St Joseph's Convent and School on Chalker Street, steps of the post office on the corner of Chalker and Druitt Streets, foundations of St John's Parish Hall on Stoke Street, foundations of the Presbyterian Church on Chalker Street, the steps of the Commercial Bank and a number of old house sites. Four buildings of Old Adaminaby, that were located further up the hill slope, escaped the inundation. They are all intact externally. The cemetery was also sited on a hill, overlooking the old town, and was not in the path of the rising waters. None of these four buildings nor the cemetery is within the draft curtilage for this site:

1. The former Methodist Church, now owned by council and used as a community hall.
2. The former public school, now used as an office building by the Angler's Retreat Campsite.
3. Denison Cottage (brick) now used for holiday lets.
4. The former Police Station and Courthouse, now used as a private residence. This two-storey concrete building was relocated further up the hill to escape the rising lake waters.

=== Pastoral sites and relics ===
==== Braemar ====
Norwegian Jens Olsen (who changed his name to James Holston) was an early settler in the Eucumbene valley in the late 1850s. With his Scottish wife he built Braemar, a house and post office of stone and brick. Holston's house was abandoned in the 1950s and covered by the waters of Lake Eucumbene until it reappeared during the 1980s at a time when the lake was quite low. Recently the original 140-year-old structure has been dismantled and all the stones and bricks illegally removed leaving little evidence other than old orchard trees and a fuel stove.

==== Burnside ====
A weatherboard homestead with a separate weatherboard kitchen, Burnside was originally owned by William and Caroline Russell in the late 19th century. The main house comprised a living room, one large bedroom, two smaller bedrooms and a front verandah with a bathroom at one end. During the 1930s or early 1940s the original kitchen block was demolished and a new kitchen was constructed attached to the main house, for the then owner, Mrs Bernie Mansfield, built by mason Billy Locker of local basalt and "liver" bricks that were popular during that era. The extension comprised a kitchen and living room with a corner chimney, an alcove for a fuel stove, an inglenook beside the fire and a separate laundry. The kitchen fireplace and chimney, laundry copper and demolished stone walls of the house remain. On the site are timber fence posts (evidence of sheds) and remains of horse-operated chaff-cutting farm machinery.

==== Boconnoc and Buckenderra ====
The site of George Yonge Mould's Boconnoc homestead is now completely overgrown, having been out of the lake water for many years. It is identifiable by exotic plantings such as elm and pine trees, relics of an extensive garden that includes plants and shrubs such as elderberries and other fruit trees. According to local evidence, there are stones and bricks indicating the house site which was demolished by the Authority in the 1970s. Stone foundations indicate the location of shearers' quarters at Boconnoc. Descendants of the Mould family had declined the Authority's offer to have four family graves exhumed and the remains, along with the headstones, relocated before the lake started filling in the late 1950s. Over the next 50 years the three grave sites with marble head stones and surrounding stone walls were regularly inundated then exposed and wave action, along with debris such as tree branches washed onto the sites, severely eroded the graves and damaged the headstones. The stone walls collapsed and there were concerns that the remains may be revealed. In June 1998 an agreement was reached between the Authority and the Mould family to remove the headstones, dismantle the walls, entomb the graves in concrete and use the stones from the walls to create protective embankments. The objective was to limit further erosion of the site and stop the graves being uncovered in the future. Some unmarked graves of the Mackay family, at Frying Pan, have been left undisturbed and to date have not been eroded by water movements. Since the lake level dropped, an old stone sheep dip with a stone paved area at one end where the sheep were stood to dry has reappeared close to Buckenderra Creek, which runs into Lake Eucumbene. It is unknown when this was constructed but the use of granite, instead of concrete, would indicate at least early 20th century, possibly earlier.

==== Tryvilla ====
A brick tank stand and some foundations are all that remains of Tryvilla, once located beside Buckenderra Creek. Old maps show that there were once three buildings at this location. The Delany family had held property at Buckenderra since 1866 although it is unknown when the homestead, which was demolished during the 1950s, was built. Remnants of foundations made of very sandy poured concrete indicate an early 20th-century building date. A pile of stones nearby could have been part of a chimney.

==== Eucumbene ====
The property dates back to earliest settlement, The first claimant, Daniel Driscoll, was living there in the 1840s. During the 1850s it passed to Mr Harnett and at the time it was recorded as the only homestead between Cooma and the fledgling town of Adaminaby. When the Herbert family bought the property in the early 20th century improvements comprised, among other things, the original homestead, stone and timber stables and sheep yards. In 1930 a new homestead was built and the old one demolished in 1943, although the materials were recycled to another of the family's properties. In 1955, when the waters of Lake Eucumbene were rising, the 1930 homestead was demolished, along with farm buildings and many materials were taken over to Kybean, some to be reused for the Kybean hall.

==== Hemsby ====
One of the Mackay properties, Hemsby, adjoined Eucumbene. The Mackay family had been in the district since Samuel Mackay went to the Kiandra goldfields in 1861. They were a large family and at times owned many properties in the district. Samuel lived at Frying Pan Creek, at his Earl's Court property. George Watkins Mackay, son of Samuel, bought the Hembsy property, not far from Kyloe copper mine, in 1912. He built a weatherboard house with corrugated iron roof surrounded by a number of outbuildings. The homestead was later extended in brick. It is remembered for having a large formal garden laid out by a landscape gardener from Andersons Seeds with a small watercourse running through it and many brick and stone edged beds and paths.

=== Industrial sites and relics ===
==== Kyloe Copper Mine ====
Most of the Kyloe mine and town was submerged but there were three main visible sites near the waters edge. In 1995/96 some concrete pillars, concrete slabs, a stone track leading in the direction of old Adaminaby and several hut and shed sites could still be seen. About 300 metres (980 ft) away an old boiler, stone, bricks and concrete indicate a processing site. Nearby was a tailings site, a slag dump and a brick floor where the smelters where located. Four other huts or shed sites were also able to be identified. These sites are probably below high water level but above the general level at which the lake is operated. In January 2007 many more relics had been exposed by the receding water of the lake. They included concrete slabs and other structures, probably processing sites, machinery parts, mine shafts, a brick plinth and a rubbish dump.

==== Waterous steam engine ====
This lies in the silt on the lake's edge between Old Adaminaby and Anglers Reach. Its approximate location is opposite the Kyloe Cooper Mine site and some people have assumed that the boiler was located on the Eucumbene River and used to pump water up to the mine site. In about 1948 Alice Reynolds, who lived at the neighbouring Grace Lea property, wrote in a school project that there was a pump on the Eucumbene River which supplied water to the copper mine up until it closed in 1913 (original material provided by David Kennedy). This could possibly be that pump. But Barry McGowan argues that water was pumped from the Eucumbene River 2.4 kilometres (1.5 mi) away from the mine site and the pumping plant was located on Frying Pan Creek. The Waterous boiler is some kilometres away from that location. Taking into account the difficulty of moving such a heavy piece of equipment it is more likely that it was used on a property to drive shearing or chaff cutting equipment. The engine is identified by its Waterous Brantford stamp on the firebox door. The boiler is 137 centimetres (54 in) in diameter and 175 centimetres (69 in) high. The whole engine is about 4.25 metres (13.9 ft) long. The Waterous Engine Works, which built the engine, was at Brantford, Ontario, Canada, and this model was known as the Champion type. It had a unique vertical boiler and an ability to raise steam from cold water in about half the time of the standard horizontal types. The rights were patented during the 1870s although it is unknown when this example was manufactured. Only a very few of the 1800 engines originally built are known to have survived. It is believed there are only two others in Australia: one still operating in Inverell, NSW and one in pieces at another location. There is only one other known in the world, which is located in the northern hemisphere.

=== Roads and Bridges ===
Since the lake level has dropped, several old roads which were Adaminaby's link with the rest of the district have reappeared. A number of other tracks head into the lake waters, stopping abruptly at the waters edge, indicating previous accesses to rural properties. Part of the road which ran between Jindabyne and Adaminaby has resurfaced not far from Braemar. The sign erected, probably at the time of the lake filling, warns motorists that the road was flooded. The closing of this road and the filling of the lake left part of the original Adaminaby community suddenly geographically belonging to Jindabyne. The original Cooma Adaminaby road can now be seen around the Buckenderra area, leading in and out of the low water at several locations. Prior to the filling of Lake Eucumbene, efforts were made to demolish the Six Mile Bridge over the Eucumbene River. It was built c. 1893 of hardwood, most likely milled locally. Its hardwood trusses and handrails were removed and a fire lit under the centre span which did burn part of the timber decking but the bridge failed to catch fire properly. The bridge is still standing and vehicles could drive across, although stability and safety are an issue. The bottom chords are mostly intact but the central span has sagged without its supporting trusses and as a result of the fire. All the piers are in place with their cross bracing and both abutments are relatively stable. Detailed measurements have not been taken as the water level of Lake Eucumbene has risen again since June 2007 and made access to the bridge impossible. The NSW Roads & Traffic Authority, Heritage Branch, even though they have details of most McDonald Truss bridges constructed in the state, has no records referring to the Six Mile Bridge on the Eucumbene River.

=== Snowy Scheme camp sites and relics ===
Two of the four Snowy camp sites known to be around Lake Eucumbene have been revealed since lake levels have receded: the Eucumbene Portal Camp and, what is believed to be, the Adaminaby Portal Camp. At the Adaminaby Portal site a well-made road heads up the hill through the camp and back down into the water, passing two large ablution blocks comprising shower and toilet stalls and a separate laundry block. A concrete tank could have been a septic system. Several series of concrete steps lead up the hill where two more large concrete pads and other concrete relics indicate the possible location of accommodation huts. A group of bottles lie on the ground, the beer bottles stamped 1952 and 1953. It is believed that the camp was closed in 1953 following the decision to relocate the proposed dam wall further down river. According to Frank Rodwell's "Homes on the Range" the camp consisted of Vandyke prefabricated barracks and huts erected by Architon Construction Co. of Cooma for the Public Works Department. Another camp at Eucumbene Portal was built for contractors and appears to have provided better quality accommodation. This site ended up partly below water. Old beer bottles, relics from the rubbish dump, well below high water mark, have 1957 stamped on the bottom indicating that it was around that year that the camp was closed. Other relics in the dump are boots, shoes, rubber gloves and helmets. Outside the actual rubbish trench is the chassis of an old vehicle with wooden spoke wheels and an Olympic tyre. At the same location are tonnes of tunnel spoil (granite rock) which has been excavated from the tunnel and dumped. The camp site itself is identifiable by a number of terra cotta drainage pipes and until relatively recently the one surviving building was used as a scout hall.

=== Eucumbene / Eaglehawk ===
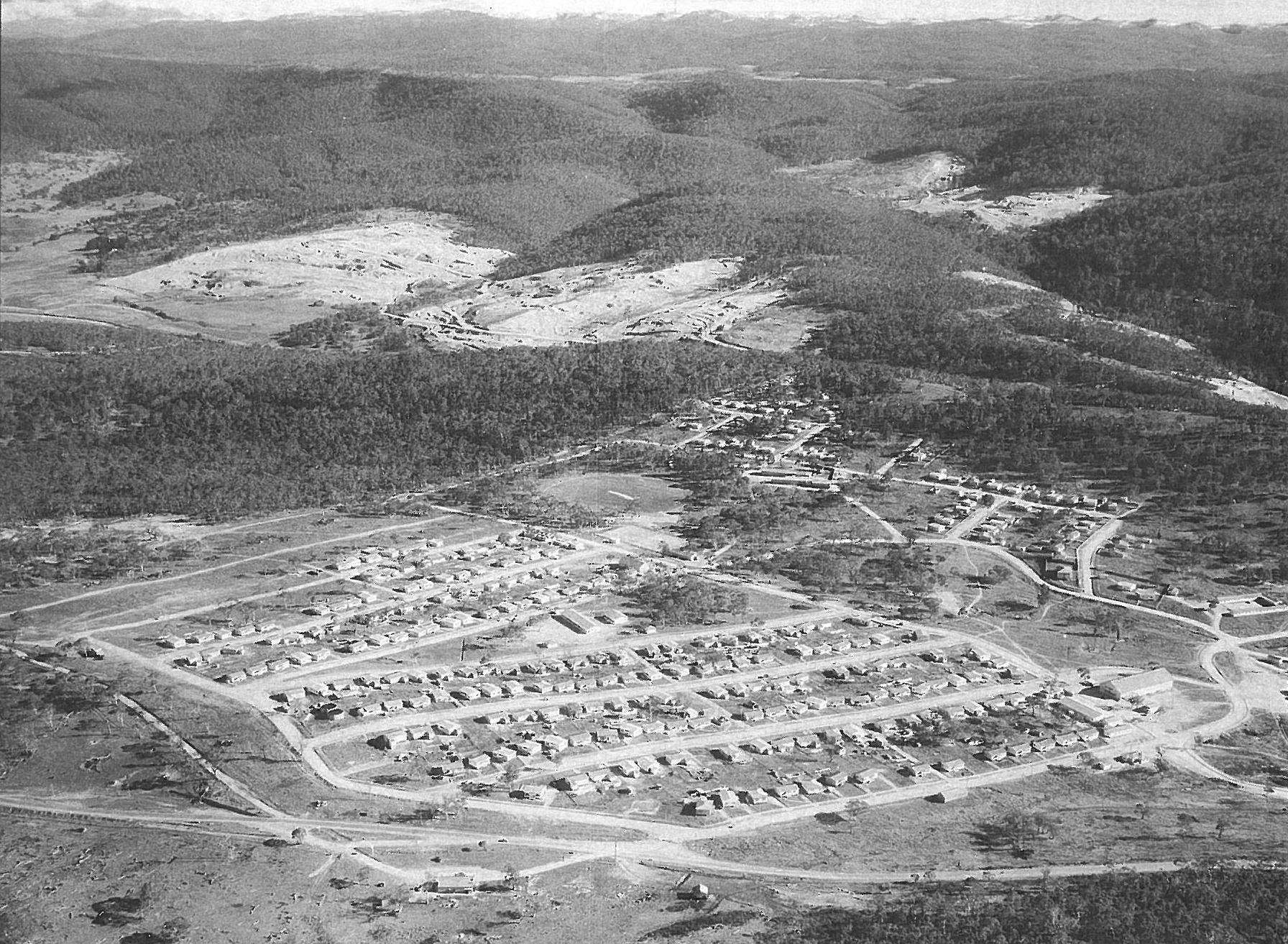

Located approximately two kilometres south-east of the Eucumbene Dam construction site; the construction camp of Eaglehawk was established in 1953. Due to confusion with a town of the same name in Victoria, it was renamed Eucumbene in 1955. Operating until 1966; it was the largest and longest-lived of the dedicated construction camps established during the construction of the Snowy Mountains Scheme. As well as accommodating workers and their families for the construction of Eucumbene Dam completed in 1958; it was also the base for construction of the Eucumbene-Snowy tunnel which commenced in 1963 and was completed in 1965.

During its thirteen-year life Eucumbene was considered a town in its own right with a peak population in excess of 2,000. It was established by the NSW Public Works Department, which had been awarded the contract to build Eucumbene Dam, on land acquired by the Snowy Mountains Authority. In 1956, the contract with the Public Works Department was terminated, ostensibly due to slow progress with the dam construction, and the American consortium Kaiser-Walsh-Perini-Raymond was contracted to complete Eucumbene Dam. Eucumbene was the most sophisticated and well-appointed of all the Snowy construction camps and this itself had become a point of contention:

“The Public Works Department had built a wonderful work camp ………… that was the envy of every other community in the region. As far as the (Snowy Mountains) Authority was concerned, the Department had been too busy settling in to do the work it had been contracted to do – namely build a dam.”

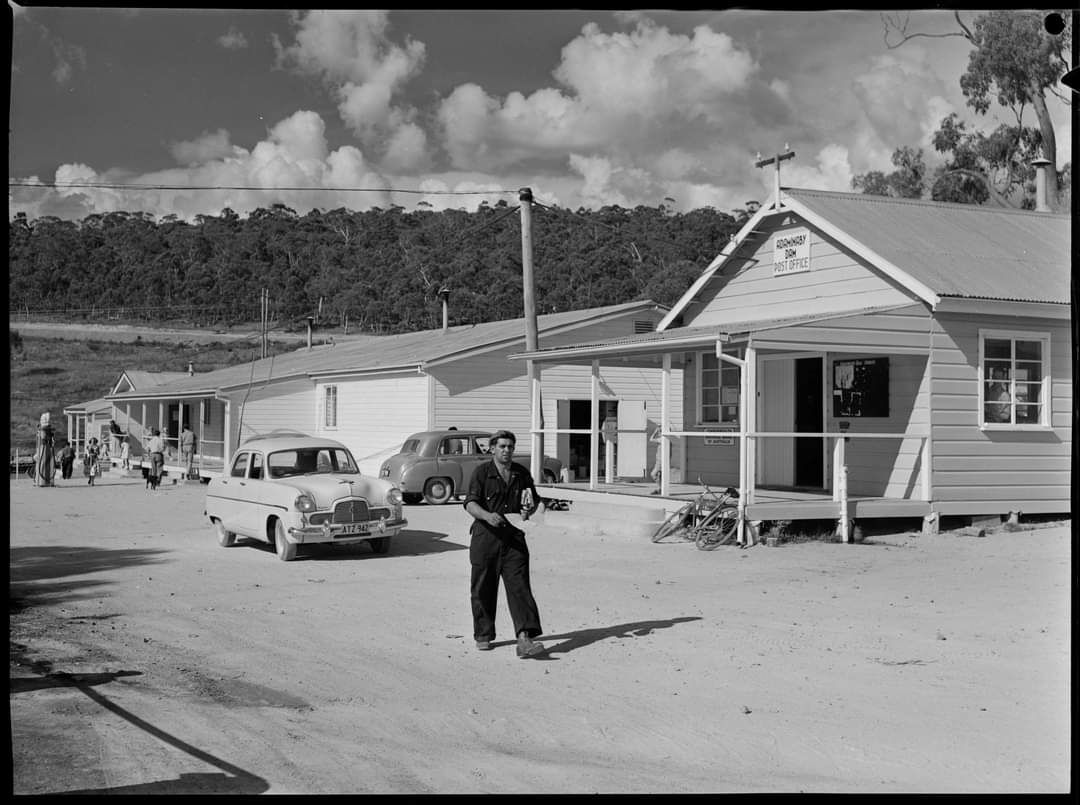

Eucumbene had a centrally located shopping centre including general store, petrol station, butcher, chemist, post office, bank and town hall. A large mess provided meals for the workers and hospitality for tourists. There were two churches and a school. A photo taken in 1954 shows more than thirty pupils in attendance at the "Eagle Hawk" Public School. It also had a sports precinct including Australian Football sized playing field, four tennis courts and pavilion/change rooms. At the north end of the town was a large works area with several workshops where servicing, repair and maintenance of the trucks and mobile plant that was used on the dam and tunnel construction was performed.

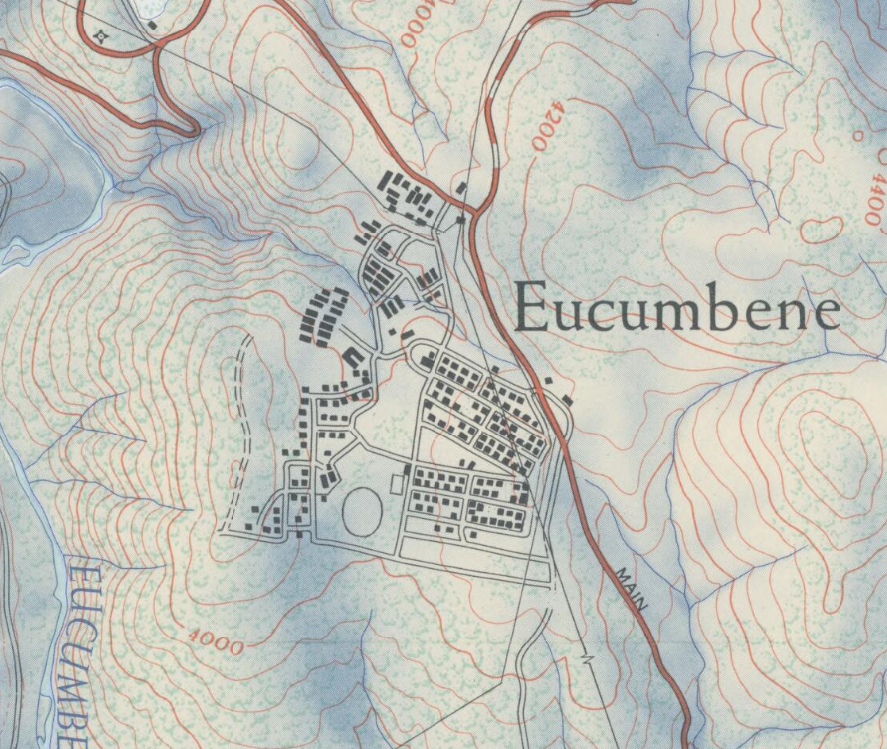

Reticulated water (including a fire hydrant service) was provided throughout the town, fed by seven water tanks of 220,000 litre capacity each located at the highest points around the town perimeter. The tanks were filled by water pumped from the Eucumbene River. The town was fully sewered with a sewage treatment plant.

After work on the Eucumbene-Snowy tunnel was completed, most houses were relocated to other Snowy Scheme camps, larger buildings were sold for demolition and removal and the town hall was relocated to Talbingo. There were two permanently built houses provided for the resident senior engineer and project manager. Today these remain as well as a number of sheds located in the former works area.

There are considerable archaeological artefacts of the former township including the road network (both unsealed and sealed), sewerage network including treatment plant, fire hydrant network and remnants of demolished infrastructure including the school, sports precinct including the pavilion, water tanks, workers mess and numerous examples of foundations, paths and fencing associated with residential houses.

Eucumbene occupied a site of approximately 230 hectares that the Snowy Mountains Authority purchased from William Crowe in 1952 and sold back to William Crowe in May 1969. Today the property remains in private ownership and is bordered by Eucumbene Road to the north and east and the Eucumbene River to the west.

=== Hallstrom Island ===
A few yards and sheds survive on the island above high water mark as evidence of the previous animal refuge. Presently out of the water are the remains of the 2.5-metre (8 ft 2 in) high kangaroo fence which was erected to keep kangaroos on the island although there are many reports of the animals swimming over to the mainland when water was low.

=== Condition ===
As at 14 March 2008, the condition of the relics was poor due to many years immersion in water followed by exposure to weather as well as wind and wave action, which washes debris onto relics or moves relics about. Filling of the lake started in 1957 and was completed in 1973. Up until recent years the lake was at 80 per cent capacity. In June 2007, due to severe drought, the lake dropped to the record low level of 10 per cent capacity. This revealed (for the first time since the lake was flooded) much of the remaining infrastructure of the town of Old Adaminaby, the surrounding pastoral area, former industrial sites, and infrastructure relating to transport and camps for workers on the Snowy Scheme. As of January 2008 Lake Eucumbene was at 20 per cent capacity.

The very nature and circumstances of these relics mean that their degree of intactness and integrity is quite low although these conditions are not crucially relevant to their heritage significance. It is remarkable that this rich and varied collection is today available for inspection and recording. There is still adequate fabric to undertake useful interpretation and research.

=== Modifications and dates ===
- 1956–57 – Relocation of 100 houses and two churches from Old Adaminaby.
- 1957 – Snowy Hydro Electric Authority demolished homesteads and buildings that were to be submerged.
- 1957 – Flooding of the Eucumbene valley started, to create Lake Eucumbene.
- 1958 – Construction of Eucumbene dam completed.
- 1959 – Water level reached the outskirts of Old Adaminaby.
- 1973 – Lake Eucumbene at full capacity.
- June 2007 – Lake Eucumbene at record low level of 10 per cent capacity.

== Heritage listing ==
As at 18 March 2008, the remains of the original town of Adaminaby (known as Old Adaminaby) and the surrounding pastoral region, now located below Lake Eucumbene, are of State heritage significance. They demonstrate more than a century of pastoral development, the growth of a town, early 20th-century copper mining and mid-20th-century transient labour camps as well as lifestyles, commerce, transport routes, social connections and traditions that were abruptly obliterated by the filling of Lake Eucumbene dam in 1957. Lake Eucumbene was the first and largest of the dams comprising the Snowy Scheme. It was a critical component of the Scheme that was one of Australia's greatest engineering achievements, a marker of the optimism of Australia's postwar reconstruction and a project of national historical and economic significance.

The impact that the flooding of the Eucumbene Valley to create Lake Eucumbene dam had on a small local community gained national prominence as the events surrounding the relocation of the inhabitants of Adaminaby and the surrounding pastoral region were followed all around Australia. The exposed relics of Old Adaminaby and the surrounding region are important for their associations with an identifiable group—the displaced inhabitants who carried with them to new locations a sense of loss and deprivation, and their descendants who today have great cultural regard for the exposed sites and relics. These are evidence of a discontinued way of life, customs, associations and traditions that were abruptly terminated. They represent a particular consequence of the development of the Snowy Scheme, for the displaced community of 1957 and their descendants.

The places and relics have potential to reveal further information regarding the century of European pastoral, urban and industrial development in the valley as well as serving as evidence of events which shaped the economic development of the nation and the nature of the lives of its population.

Only two towns have been purposely flooded to create dams for the Snowy Scheme. Adaminaby was the larger and more significant of the two towns, and the flooding of Lake Eucumbene impacted on the greater number of people. The exposure of the sites and relics of Old Adaminaby and surrounding districts half a century after their inundation is unexpected, remarkable and unique and has vested in the revealed relics a high level of significance, both for the immediate descendants and for the wider community.

One exposed relic, the Waterous steam engine, is rare worldwide, and is one of only two other known complete examples: one located in Australia at Inverell and the other in the northern hemisphere.

Old Adaminaby and Lake Eucumbene was listed on the New South Wales State Heritage Register on 3 June 2008 having satisfied the following criteria.

The place is important in demonstrating the course, or pattern, of cultural or natural history in New South Wales.

The site of Old Adaminaby, which now lies on the lakebed of Lake Eucumbene, represents a significant historical phase of over a century's development of the town of Old Adaminaby and the surrounding pastoral districts. The site demonstrates 130 years of development of the wealthy pastoral industry of the Eucumbene valley, the growth of a thriving small rural town (that started with three small huts) over 100 years, as well as lifestyles, commerce, transport routes, social connections and traditions, all of which were abruptly halted in 1957 by the flooding of the Eucumbene valley to create Lake Eucumbene. The site also demonstrates other historical activities that had ceased by 1957, including the development of a thriving copper mining and processing industry in the late nineteenth and early twentieth centuries and mid twentieth century transit labour camps associated with the Snowy Scheme. The inundation of Old Adaminaby and the surrounding pastoral districts to create the Lake Eucumbene dam is associated with the significant historical activity of the Snowy Scheme. Lake Eucumbene was the first and largest of the 16 dams constructed by the Scheme to provide integrated irrigation and hydro electric power to three states. Lake Eucumbene was a critical component of the Snowy Scheme which was a landmark engineering achievement in Australia's history that influenced the economies and communities of NSW, Victoria and South Australia. The Snowy Scheme has become one of Australia's legendary icons. It is one of only two sites in Australia that has been recognised as an international Historic Civil Engineering Landmark by the American Society of Civil Engineers (the other being the Sydney Harbour Bridge).

The place has a strong or special association with a particular community or cultural group in New South Wales for social, cultural or spiritual reasons.

The site meets this criterion of State significance for its associations with the community of displaced inhabitants of 1957 and their descendants, and for its significance to that present community of descendants. The inhabitants of the Eucumbene Valley and Old Adaminaby who were displaced by the Snowy Scheme's development of Lake Eucumbene (some of whom were obliged to move away from the area) have great regard for their past demonstrated at this site and for the events which led to the immense change in their lives. The termination of lifestyles, associations, customs, and traditions has left many among this community marked by long standing sadness, resentment and bitterness for the events that gave rise to their removal, and for the way in which it was managed. Furthermore, the emergence of submerged sites and relics in the recent drought has compounded the disenfranchisement felt by many original residents and their descendants who now feel proprietorial with regard to the exposed sites and relics that are significant evidence of their past lives and culture. Their negative feelings have been reinforced by the illegal removal of some relics in 2007. The site also has significance to a community beyond those affected by the relocation of 1957, as the land resumptions and relocation process were followed around Australia in the late 1950s and public interest has refocussed with the re-emergence of relics in the drought.

The place has potential to yield information that will contribute to an understanding of the cultural or natural history of New South Wales.

The relics of Old Adaminaby and the surrounding districts on Lake Eucumbene's floor are evidence of more than a century of pastoral life, development of a hamlet into a town, previous mining practices and the lives and working conditions of men employed on the Snowy Scheme, which was one of Australia's greatest engineering achievements. The relics represent a variety of previous customs, lifestyles and processes which were abruptly terminated in an unusual way. They serve as a benchmark for the Scheme's construction and illustrate the optimism of Australia's postwar reconstruction. Many sites would have archaeological potential. The Waterous steam engine is a significant and rare piece of engineering heritage. The site may also provide useful research for predicting the future impacts of climate change and flooding on coastal communities and the impacts of long-term immersion in water on buildings and other structures. The site meets this criterion of State significance for research potential because the Snowy Scheme is one of Australia's greatest engineering achievements.

The place possesses uncommon, rare or endangered aspects of the cultural or natural history of New South Wales.

The site meets this criterion of State significance as one of only two similar sites in Australia. The other is the nearby Lake Jindabyne. Old Adaminaby and Jindabyne were the two towns flooded in 1957 and 1967 respectively to create dams for the Snowy Scheme. Old Adaminably is the only one of the two towns to be revealed again in drought conditions. Old Adaminaby was the first and the larger of the two towns to be flooded. Jindabyne was a much smaller township than Old Adaminaby and Lake Jindabyne is approximately one quarter of the size of Lake Eucumbene. The flooding of the Eucumbene Valley resulted in momentous life changes for a larger number of people. Moreover, Jindabyne did not have the same rich variety of artefacts dating from the mid 19th century to the mid 20th century as did Adaminaby. Following the experience of flooding Old Adaminaby, the process of relocating the inhabitants of Jindabyne was handled differently. Exceptionally, and unexpectedly, as a consequence of severe and prolonged drought, Old Adaminaby and parts of the surrounding districts have been revealed again, 50 years after the commencement of their inundation. The places and objects which have survived the processes of inundation followed by desiccation and the subsequent damage which occurred are a unique group of rare items. Jindabyne, however, is located in deeper water and unlikely ever to be revealed again. One revealed item at Lake Eucumbene, the Waterous boiler (a rare vertical boiler), is one of only three complete known examples in the world. The others are in Inverell, NSW and in the Northern Hemisphere.

The place is important in demonstrating the principal characteristics of a class of cultural or natural places/environments in New South Wales.

The remnant structures and relics of Old Adaminaby and the surrounding districts, grouped under the categories of former township, pastoral, industrial, transport and Snowy Mountains Scheme development are representative of similar NSW settlements that can display remnant structures of over a century of similar development. In this case, however, all further development abruptly ceased at a certain point in time so that the remnant structures and relics of Old Adaminaby and the surrounding districts are cast in a late 1950s time warp.

== See also ==
- Monaro (New South Wales)
- Kosciuszko National Park
- Snowy Hydro Limited
- Snowy Mountains Scheme
- Snowy Scheme Museum
