= Eucumbene Dam =

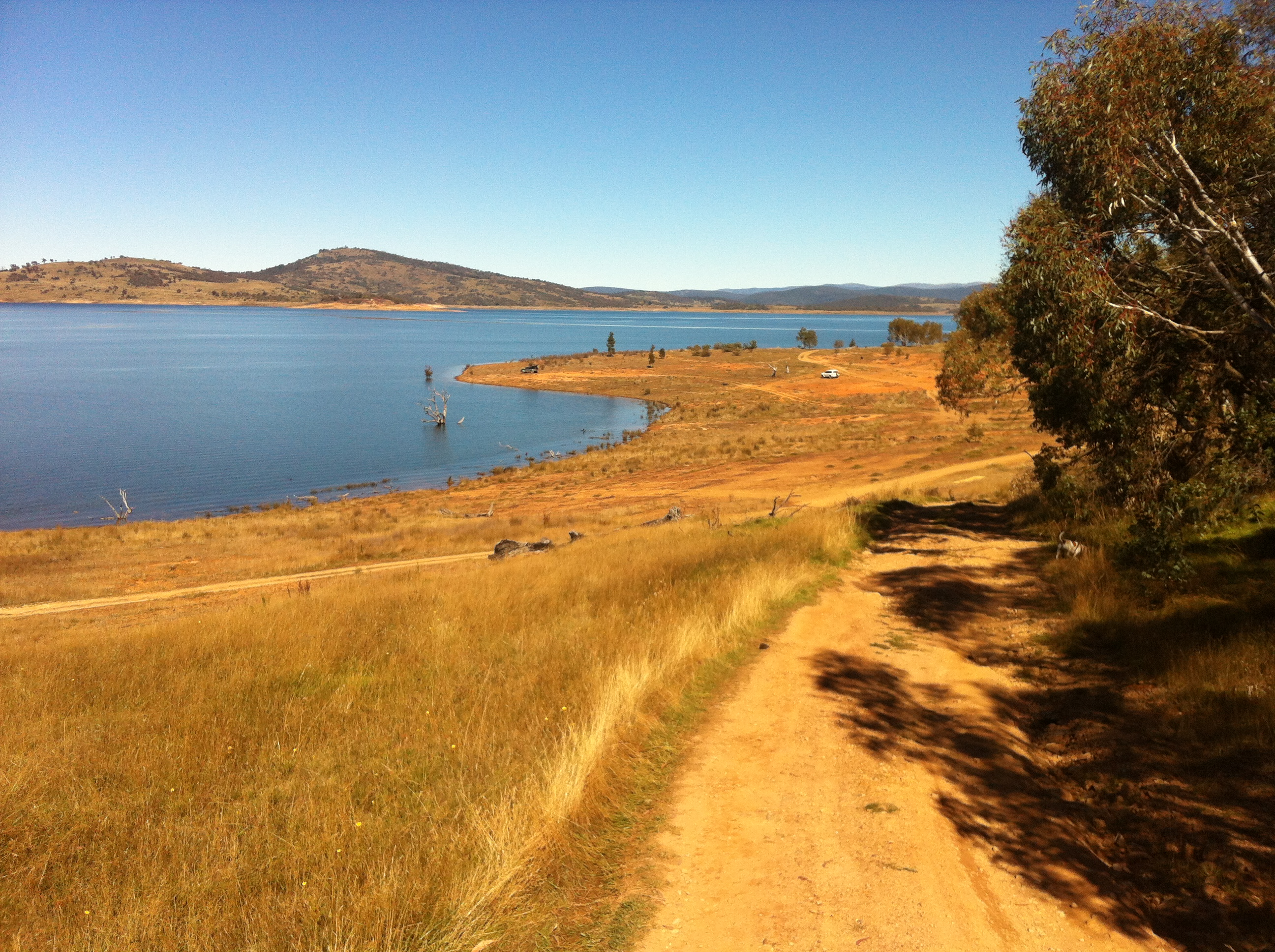
- Lake Eucumbene looking towards the Snowy Mountains, 2012.

- Location of Eucumbene Dam in New South Wales
- Country: Australia
- Location: Snowy Mountains, New South Wales
- Coordinates: 36.12843°S 148.61575°E
- Purpose: Hydro-power, diversion, irrigation
- Status: Operational
- Construction began: May 1956
- Opening date: May 1958
- Owner: Snowy Hydro

Dam and spillways
- Type of dam: Embankment dam
- Impounds: Eucumbene River
- Height: 116 m (381 ft)
- Length: 579 m (1,900 ft)
- Elevation at crest: 1,168 metres (3,832 ft) AHD
- Width (base): 686 m (2,251 ft)
- Dam volume: 6,735,000 m^{3} (237,800,000 cu ft)
- Spillways: 1
- Spillway type: Overflow ski-jump and bucket with two vertical lift gates
- Spillway capacity: 475 m^{3}/s (16,800 cu ft/s)

Reservoir
- Creates: Lake Eucumbene
- Total capacity: 4,798 GL (1.055×10^{12} imp gal; 1.267×10^{12} US gal) (4.798 km^{3}; 3,890,000 acre⋅ft)
- Active capacity: 4,366.5 GL (9.605×10^{11} imp gal; 1.1535×10^{12} US gal) (4.3665 km^{3}; 3,540,000 acre⋅ft)
- Catchment area: 683 km^{2} (264 sq mi)
- Surface area: 14,542 ha (35,930 acres)
- Maximum water depth: 107 m (351 ft)
- Website; Eucumbene Dam at the Powerhouse Museum.

Eucumbene Dam is a major gated earthfill embankment dam with an overflow ski-jump and bucket spillway with two vertical lift gates across the Eucumbene River in the Snowy Mountains of New South Wales, Australia. The dam's main purpose is the generation of hydro-power and it is one of the sixteen major dams that comprise the Snowy Mountains Scheme, a vast hydroelectricity and irrigation complex constructed in south-east Australia between 1949 and 1974 and now run by Snowy Hydro.

The impounded reservoir is called Lake Eucumbene, the largest storage lake in the Snowy Mountains Scheme.

== Location and features ==
Commenced in May 1956 and completed in May 1958, Eucumbene Dam is a major dam, located approximately 1 kilometre (0.62 mi) northeast of the locality of Eucumbene Cove. The dam was constructed by a consortium comprising the Department of Public Works and Kaiser-Walsh-Perini-Raymond based on engineering plans developed by the United States Bureau of Reclamation and the Department of Public Works, under contract from the Snowy Mountains Hydroelectric Authority. Construction of the dam inundated the original township of Old Adaminaby, which was relocated to Adaminaby in the 1950s, requiring approximately 800 people to be moved.

The outer walls of the dam are built of rock while the inner core is compacted, impervious clay. The earthfill embankment dam wall comprising 6,735,000 cubic metres (237,800,000 cu ft) of earth and rockfill is 116 metres (381 ft) high and 579 metres (1,900 ft) long. The foundation of the dam comprises closely jointed hard siltstone and quartzite with overburden of decomposed rock and slope-wash up to 6.1 metres (20 ft) deep. A subsidiary embankment containing 121,900 cubic metres (4,300,000 cu ft) of fill across a low saddle in a ridge forms the left abutment of the dam wall. At 100% capacity the dam wall, with an elevation of 1,168 metres (3,832 ft) AHD, holds back 4,798 gigalitres (1.055×10^{12} imp gal; 1.267×10^{12} US gal) or (4.798 km^{3}; 3,890,000 acre⋅ft) of water, approximately equal to nine times the volume of Sydney Harbour. The surface area of Lake Eucumbene is 14,542 hectares (35,930 acres) and the catchment area is 683 square kilometres (264 sq mi). The overflow ski-jump and bucket spillway with two vertical lift gates is capable of discharging 475 cubic metres per second (16,800 cu ft/s). The two gates, each 6.7 metres (22 ft) wide by 3.9 metres (13 ft) high were constructed during 1977-78 under a separate contract.

=== Lake Eucumbene ===
Lake Eucumbene is the largest reservoir in the Snowy Mountains Scheme and is the central connection for the northern (Tumut/Murrumbidgee rivers) and southern (Snowy River) halves of the Scheme. The Goodradigbee and Murrumbidgee rivers from Tantangara Dam are connected to the Eucumbene River at Lake Eucumbene via the Murrumbidgee-Eucumbene Haupt-tunnel. The Eucumbene River at Lake Eucumbene is connected to the Snowy River at Island Bend Pondage via the 23.5 kilometres (14.6 mi) long Eucumbene-Snowy Haupt-tunnel; the longest tunnel in the Snowy Mountains Scheme, with a circular diameter of 6.3 metres (21 ft).

Also at Lake Eucumbene, the 22.2 kilometres (13.8 mi) long Eucumbene-Tumut Haupt-tunnel diverts the flow of the Snowy River to the Tumut River, empting into Tumut Pond Reservoir; and into the Murray–Darling basin. This tunnel was constructed between November 1954 and July 1959 and along 28% of its length is lined with a 6.4 metres (21 ft) circular diameter. The residual length of the tunnel in unlined and 6.93 metres (22.7 ft) circular in diameter. Construction was through granite and metamorphosed sedimentary rock, involving the excavation of 978,600 cubic metres (34,560,000 cu ft); and 71,100 cubic metres (2,510,000 cu ft) concrete was used to install the pipeline.

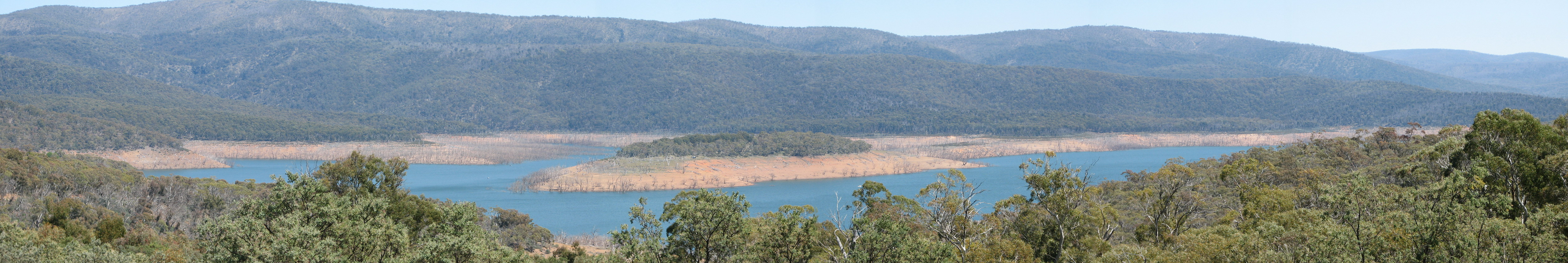
Lake Eucumbene, 2006

The valley, which was flooded following construction of the Eucumbene Dam, had been an agricultural centre since the 1830s. A number of homesteads and most of the township of Adaminaby lay within the inundation area of the proposed dam. Most of the buildings in the town relocated to a site on the Snowy Mountains Highway, but some buildings were not flooded and remain at Old Adaminaby.

The story of Adaminaby's relocation was the subject of film produced by the Snowy Mountains Authority Film Unit in 1958, entitled Operation Adaminaby. It was also the subject of a 2001 documentary by historian Jeannine Baker, entitled Our Drowned Town, which screened on SBS Television. Entire houses, and even the Commercial Bank building were transported on the back of trucks and over 100 buildings were re-erected at the new townsite. Transportation of the first house from Old Adaminaby to New Adaminaby (a distance of just six miles) took six days. Today a tourist village has been built around the handful of buildings which were not relocated from the newly created lakeshore at Old Adaminaby.

When the lake is low, remains of the former township and other relics can be seen along the shoreline. For a period of time around 2007, the waters of Lake Eucumbene had receded due to a prolonged drought and Old Adaminaby began to reveal itself after being underwater for over 50 years – gaining the attention of the global media. Of particular interest was the re-emergence of the old 6 Mile Bridge near Anglers Reach on the former highway route to Kiandra.

== Climate ==
Lake Eucumbene has mild, stormy summers and cold, wet winters; with a largely uniform rainfall pattern, peaking somewhat in late winter and springtime. Frosts occur regularly during autumn, winter and spring, and can occur also in summer. Snow can occur at any time of the year, save for high summer, and is often heaviest on the northern and western shores of the lake.

Climate data for Adaminaby (Yaouk, 1969–2022); 1,140 m AMSL; 35.79° S, 148.81° E
Month	Jan	Feb	Mar	Apr	May	Jun	Jul	Aug	Sep	Oct	Nov	Dec	Year
Average precipitation mm (inches)	79.0 (3.11)	73.8 (2.91)	59.1 (2.33)	50.2 (1.98)	57.8 (2.28)	81.8 (3.22)	71.1 (2.80)	90.8 (3.57)	87.4 (3.44)	73.7 (2.90)	86.3 (3.40)	81.7 (3.22)	909.9 (35.82)
Source: Australian Bureau of Meteorology; Adaminaby (Yaouk)

== Gallery ==
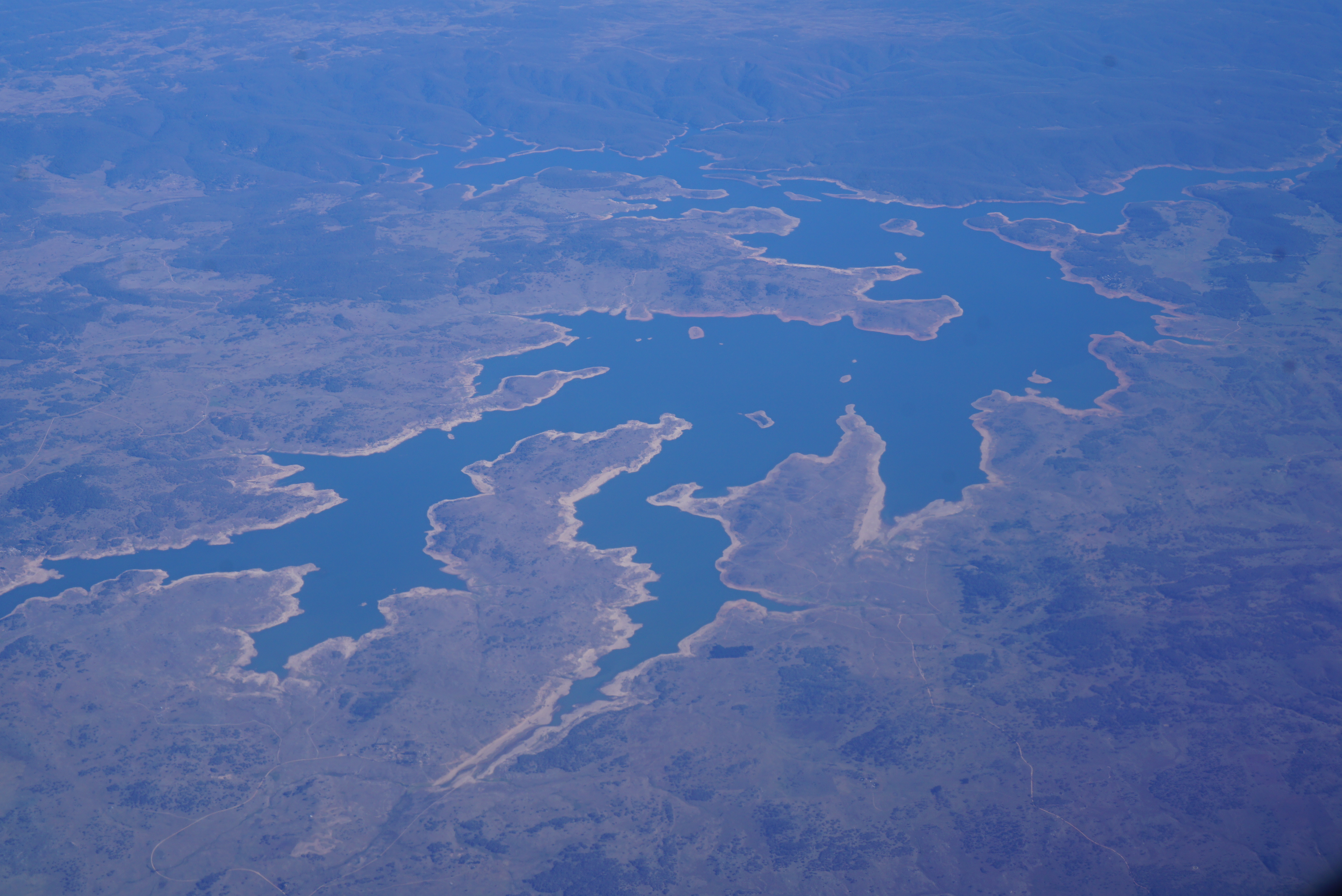
Lake Eucumbene viewed from the air

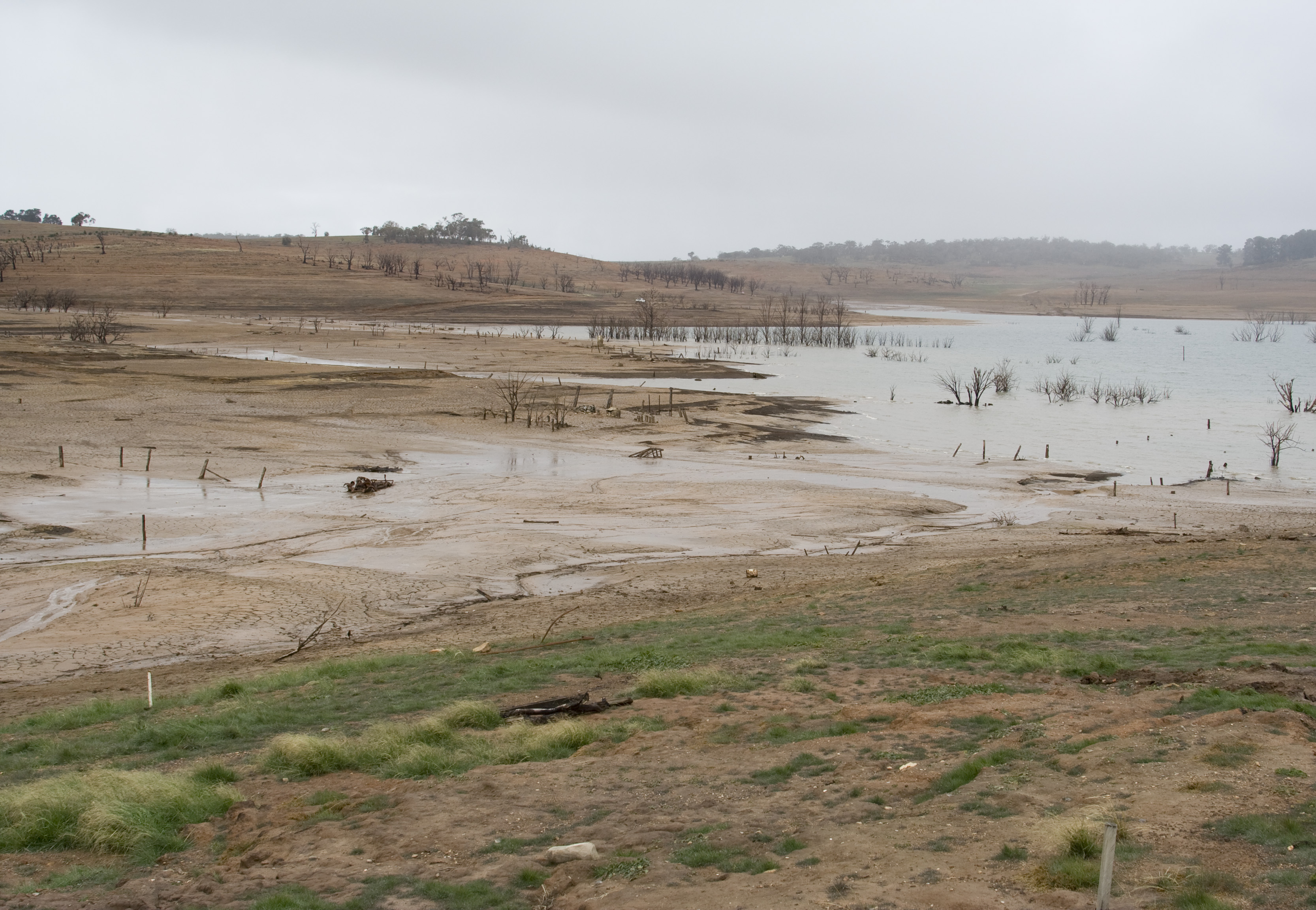
The remains of Old Adaminaby, on the shores of Lake Eucumbene, during prolonged drought, 2007.

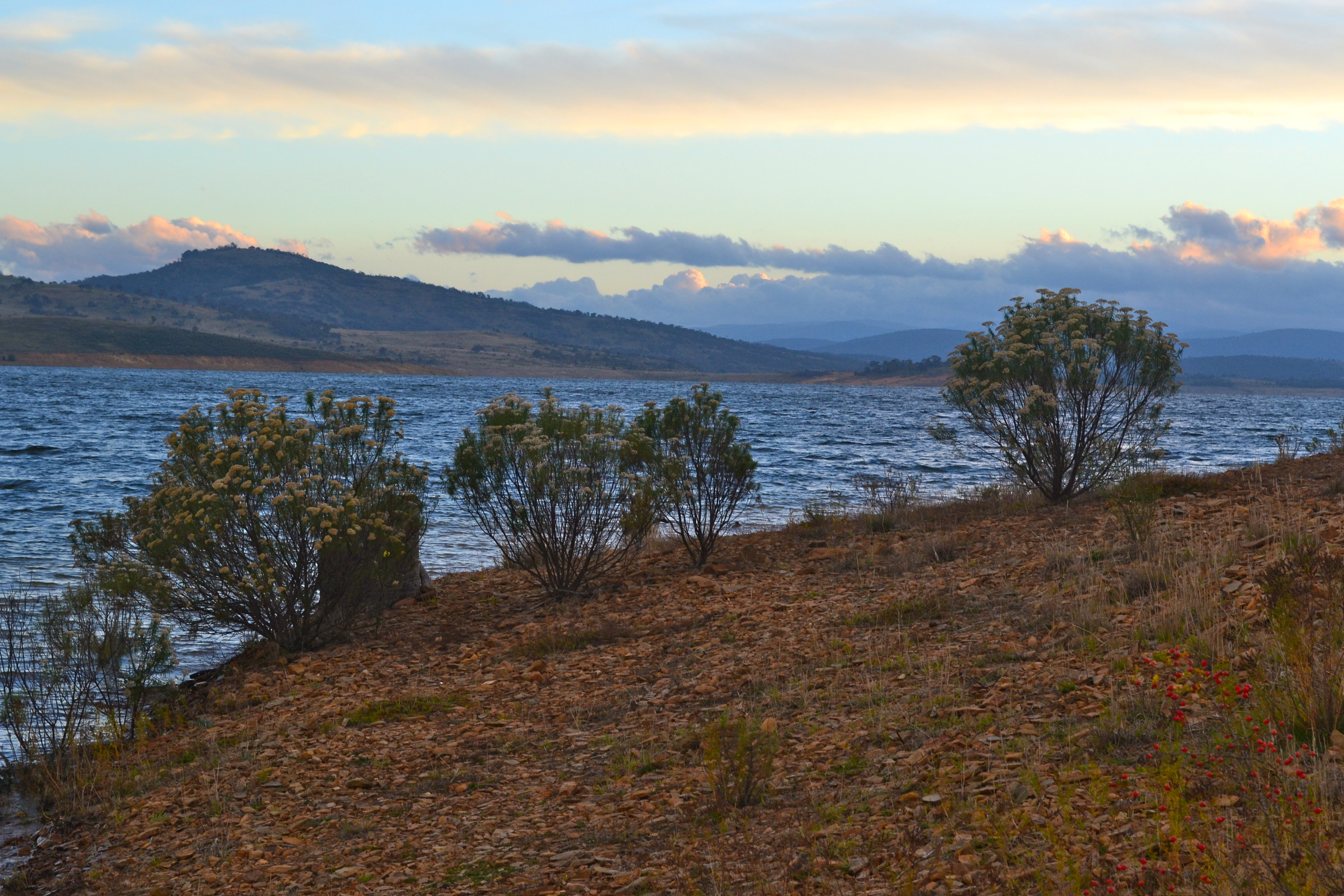
Looking towards Mt Cobrabald, 2012.

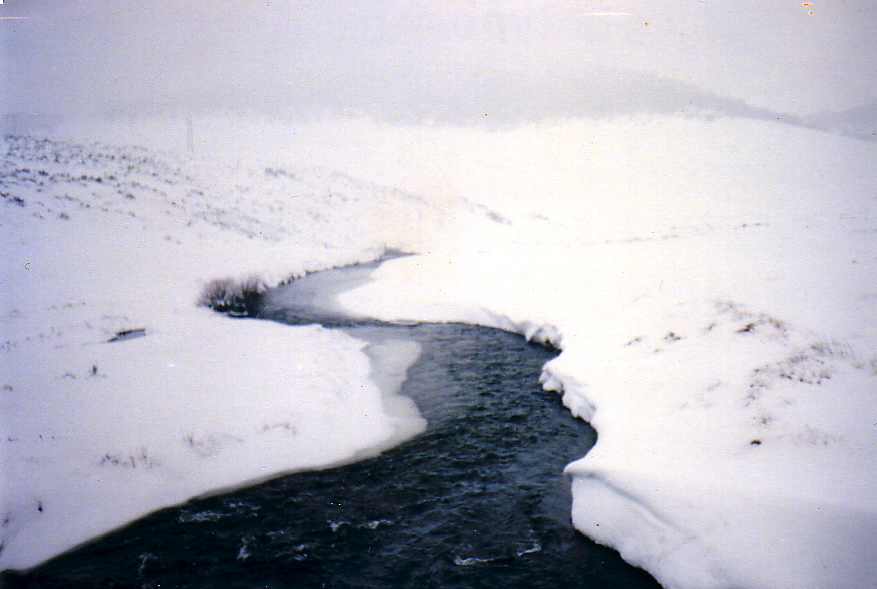
A snowbound Eucumbene River, upstream from Lake Eucumbene, at Kiandra.

== See also ==
- Old Adaminaby and Lake Eucumbene
- Kosciuszko National Park
- List of dams and reservoirs in New South Wales
- Snowy Hydro Limited
- Snowy Mountains Scheme
- Snowy Scheme Museum
