= Dinner (disambiguation) =

Dinner is the most significant and important meal of the day, which can be the noon or the evening meal.

Dinner may also refer to:

- Dinner (film), a 2016 Nigerian comedy film
- Dinner (play), by Moira Buffini
- Dinner Creek, a creek in Minnesota
- Dinner Lake, a lake of Highlands County, Florida, United States
- Dinner (book), a 2025 cookbook by Meera Sodha
- " DINNER!", a song by femtanyl

== People with the surname ==
- Michael Dinner (born 1953), American television director, producer and writer

== See also ==
- The Dinner (disambiguation)
- Dinner Time (disambiguation)
- Kraft Dinner, packaged macaroni and cheese
- Supper
- Diner
