= Cann River =

Cann Cann River West Branch, Buldah River
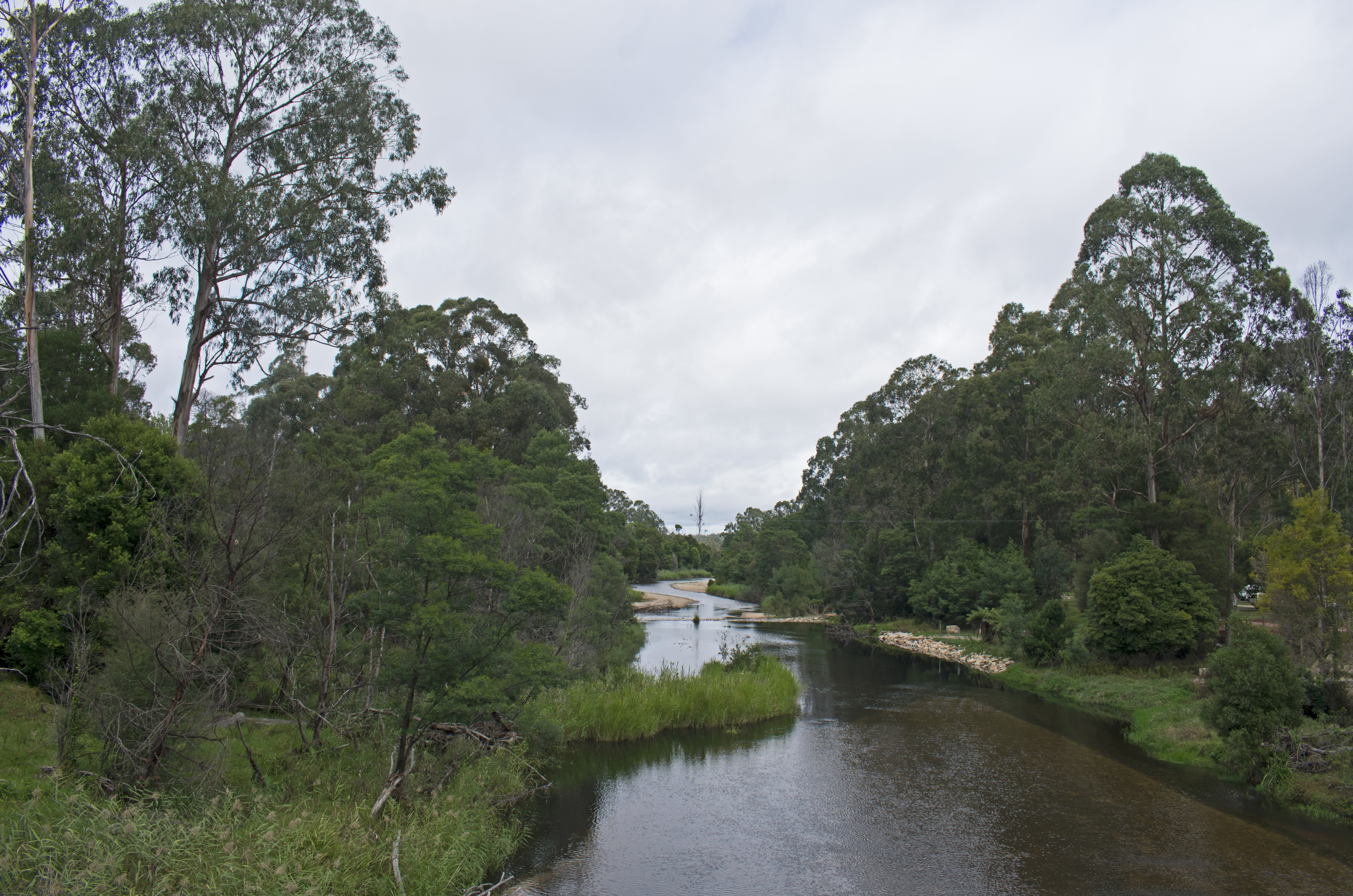
- Cann River seen from Princes Highway downstream

- Mouth of the Cann River, in Victoria.

Location
- Country: Australia
- State: Victoria
- Region: South East Corner (IBRA), East Gippsland
- Local government area: Shire of East Gippsland
- Town: Cann River

Physical characteristics
- Source: Granite Mountain, Cobienar Range
  - location: Errinundra National Park
  - elevation: 1,080 m (3,540 ft)
- Mouth: Bass Strait
  - location: Tamboon Inlet
  - coordinates: 37°45′3″S 149°7′18″E
  - elevation: 0 m (0 ft)
- Length: 102 km (63 mi)
- Basin size: 1,167 km^{2} (451 sq mi)

Basin features
- Tributaries
  - left: Ino Creek, Tennyson Creek, Buldah Creek, Kelly Creek, Cann River East Branch, Log Bridge Creek, Dinner Creek, George Creek, Gibbs Creek, Peach Tree Creek (Victoria)
  - right: Cameron Creek (Victoria), Kate Creek, Neilson Creek, Jim Walker Creek, Steve Creek, Tonghi Creek, Camp Creek (Victoria)
- National parks: Errinundra NP, Coopracambra NP, Croajingolong NP

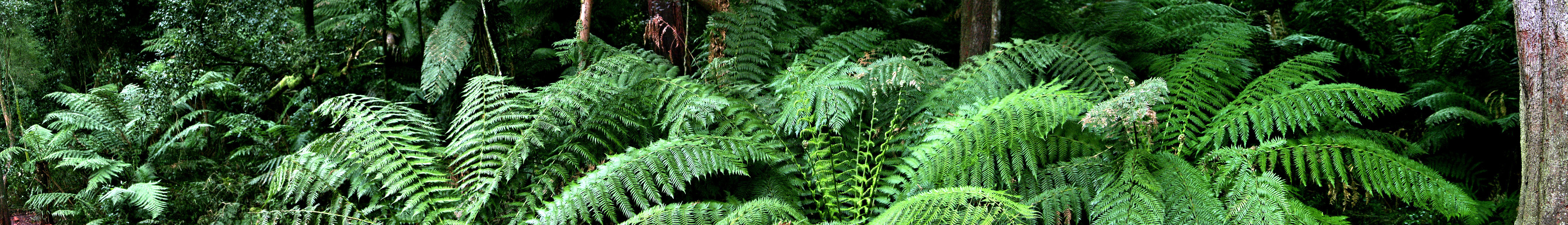
Ferns near Cann River, Victoria, Australia

The Cann River is a perennial river located in the East Gippsland region of the Australian state of Victoria.

== Course and features ==
The Cann River rises southwest of Granite Mountain in remote country on the eastern boundary of the Errinundra National Park and flows generally east, then south, then east, then south through the western edge of the Coopracambra National Park and through the Croajingolong National Park, joined by seventeen minor tributaries before reaching its mouth with Bass Strait, at the Tamboon Inlet in the Shire of East Gippsland. The river descends 1,080 metres (3,540 ft) over its 102 kilometres (63 mi) course.

The river is traversed by the Monaro Highway in its upper reaches, and the Princes Highway at the town of Cann River.

The Cann River catchment area is 1,167 square kilometres (451 sq mi), the majority of which is contained within the state of Victoria and managed by the East Gippsland Catchment Management Authority. A small portion of the catchment lies within New South Wales, most notably the Tennyson Creek sub-catchment.

== See also ==
- List of rivers of Australia
