= Bibbenluke =

- Town
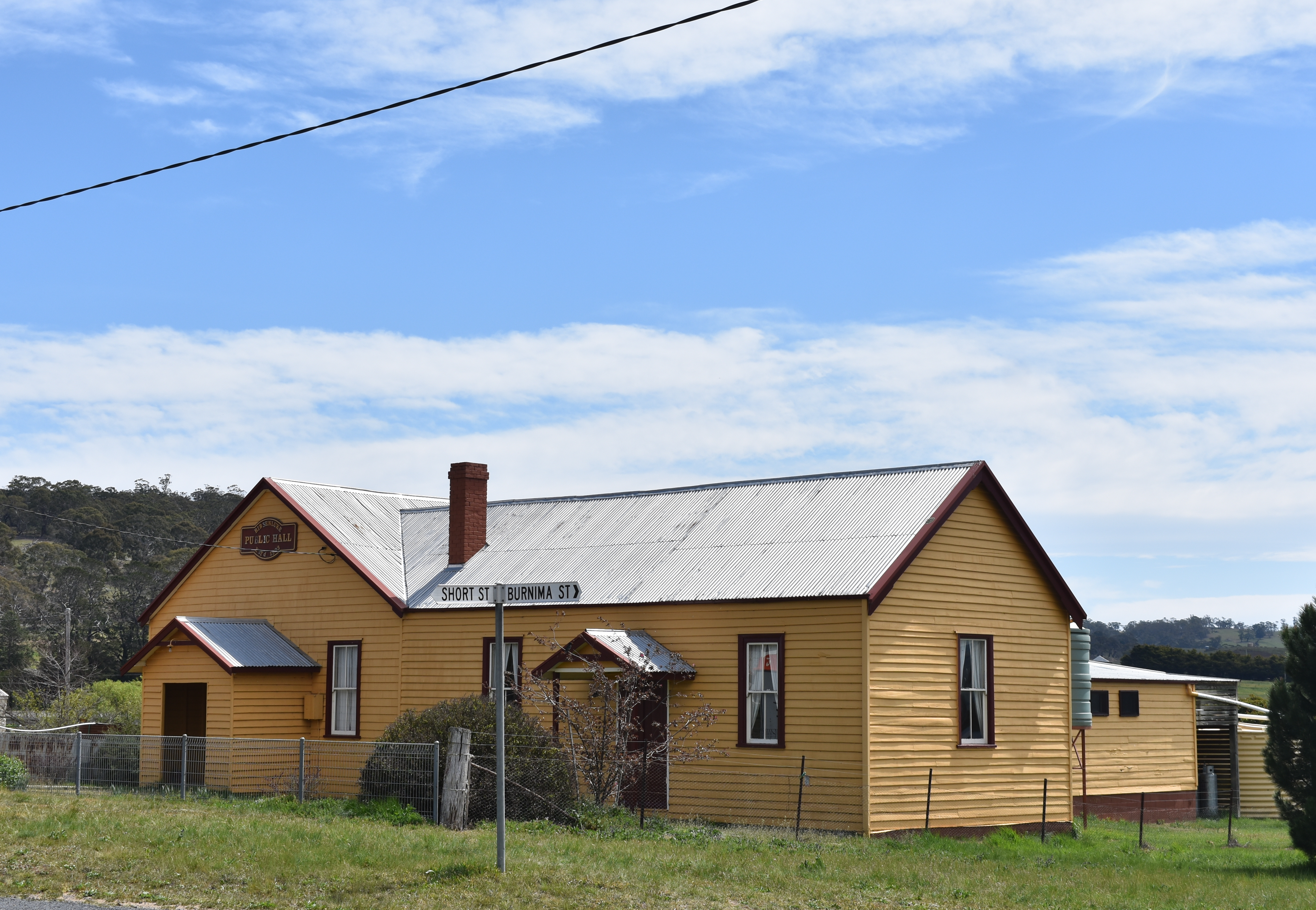
- Bibbenluke Public Hall, 2020

- Coordinates: 36°48′47″S 149°17′17″E
- Country: Australia
- State: New South Wales
- LGA: Snowy Monaro Regional Council
- Location: 470 km (290 mi) SSW of Sydney; 13 km (8.1 mi) N of Bombala
- Established: 1833

Government
  - State electorate: Monaro
  - Federal division: Eden-Monaro
- Elevation: 728 m (2,388 ft)

Population
  - Total: 87 (2016 census)
- Postcode: 2632
- Mean max temp: 17.8 °C (64.0 °F)
- Mean min temp: 5.1 °C (41.2 °F)
- Annual rainfall: 496.9 mm (19.56 in)

Bibbenluke is a village in the Snowy Monaro Regional Council in southern New South Wales, Australia. The village is located at a crossing point of the Monaro Highway and Bombala River. The name is derived from a local Aboriginal word either meaning "Big Lookout" or "Place of Birds".

== History ==
In 1833, notable pastoralist Joshua John Moore established a sheep grazing property named "Bibbenluke", and from this property a number of other stations in the area were also managed. The significance of Bibbenluke grew throughout the 19th Century, helped somewhat by an association with another pioneer, Scottish-born Benjamin Boyd. Boyd established the port of Boydtown near the town of Eden east of the Monaro in 1843 to support pastoral activities on his properties in the region. A school was established to serve the growing community around the station in 1871, and by 1884 significant commerce and industry had developed, with 3 carpenters, a stonemason, a blacksmith, a hotel and at least two stores operating in the town. An Anglican church operated out of a community hall on the sheep station around this time and the building was eventually relocated to the townsite in 1937.

On 11 January 1915 the Men from Snowy River recruitment banner march from Delegate and Goulburn visited the town and enlisted 6 men from the local community to serve with the 1st AIF during World War I. A similar march along the same route passed through the town in April 1940 to recruit volunteers during World War II.

In 1977, Bibbenluke Shire was amalgamated into the former Bombala Shire. December 1997 saw the opening of an upgraded bridge across the Bombala River, replacing the last remaining timber bridge on the Monaro Highway. Bombala was further amalgamated in 2016 to become part of the Snowy Monaro Regional Council.

== Present day ==
Modern Bibbenluke is a small community that has close links with and relies on the larger town of Bombala for many public services. The school remains, although enrollments as of 2013 are now as low as 11 pupils. The community hall is the focal point of the village. Other historic buildings in town include the Anglican church and the original Bibbenluke Hotel, although this has been converted to a private residence. There is also a cemetery located in the village. The local economy is based mostly around farming and tourism, with a number of small businesses operating, including the historic Ben Boyd Guesthouse and Bibbenluke Australian Stock Horse Stud.

== Notable residents ==
- Joshua John Moore (1790-1864). Grazier and Lieutenant of the 14th Regiment Royal South Lincoln Militia during the Battle of Waterloo in 1815 established the original pastoral property at Bibbenluke after emigrating to the colony of New South Wales in 1816.
- Lucy Culliton (1966- ). Artist known for her entries in the Archibald contest and paintings in permanent collection at various prestigious galleries.
