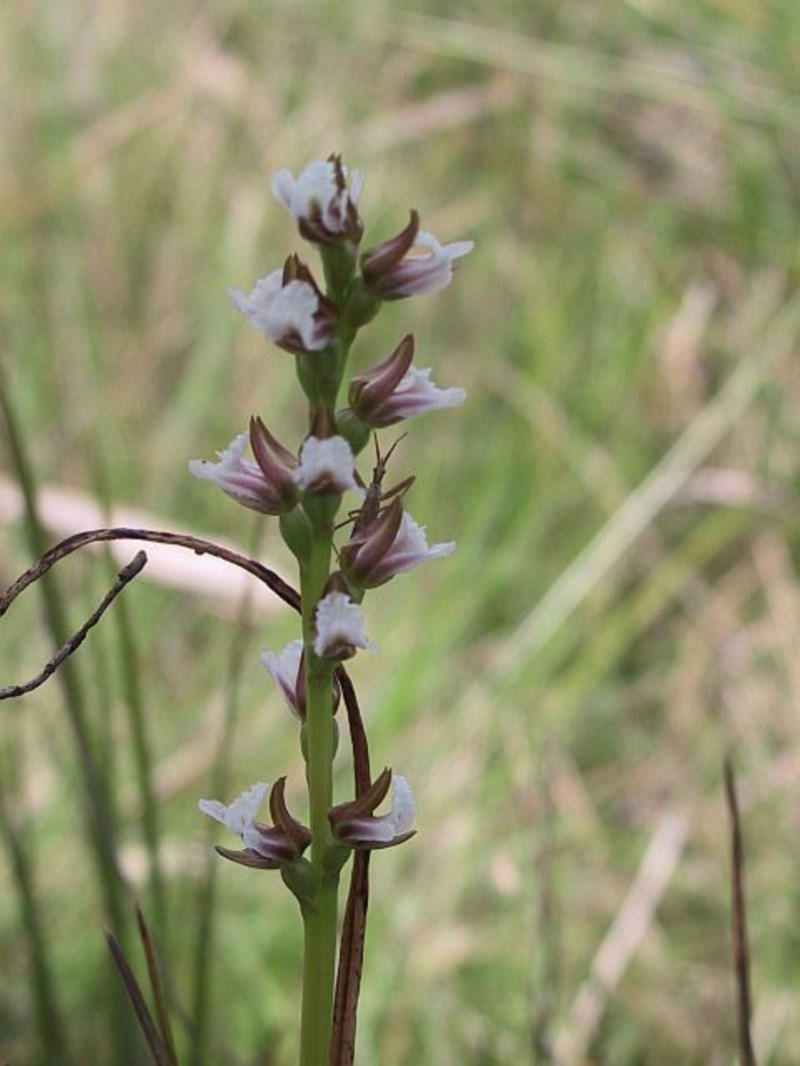

Scientific classification
- Kingdom: Plantae
- Clade: Embryophytes
- Clade: Tracheophytes
- Clade: Spermatophytes
- Clade: Angiosperms
- Clade: Monocots
- Order: Asparagales
- Family: Orchidaceae
- Subfamily: Orchidoideae
- Tribe: Diurideae
- Subtribe: Prasophyllinae
- Genus: Prasophyllum
- Species: P. caricetum

Binomial name
- Prasophyllum caricetum D.L.Jones

= Prasophyllum caricetum =

Cathcart leek orchid

Species of orchid

Prasophyllum caricetum, commonly known as Cathcart leek orchid, is a species of orchid endemic to a small area of southern New South Wales. It has a single tubular, bright green leaf and up to twenty five green, white and purplish flowers crowded on the flowering stem. It grows in montane swamps near Cathcart.

== Description ==
Prasophyllum caricetum is a terrestrial, perennial, deciduous, herb with an underground tuber and a single tube-shaped leaf, shiny, bright green leaf 200–350 mm (7.9–14 in) long with a whitish base. Between five and twenty five flowers are crowded along the flowering spike. The flowers are green with purplish and white petals and a white labellum. As with others in the genus, the flowers are inverted so that the labellum is above the column rather than below it. The dorsal sepal is egg-shaped to lance-shaped, 7.5–12 mm (0.3–0.5 in) long, about 4 mm (0.2 in) wide and curves upwards. The lateral sepals are linear to lance-shaped, 7.5–12 mm (0.3–0.5 in) long, about 4 mm (0.2 in) wide and sometimes joined together. The petals are linear in shape and about the same dimensions as the lateral sepals. The labellum is broadly oblong or elliptic to egg-shaped, 8–14 mm (0.3–0.6 in) long, 4–6 mm (0.16–0.24 in) wide, turns upwards and has a wavy edge. Flowering occurs from December to February.

== Taxonomy and naming ==
Prasophyllum caricetum was first formally described in 2000 by David Jones from a specimen collected near Cathcart and the description was published in The Orchadian.

== Distribution and habitat ==
This leek orchid grows in swamps with sedges and rush-like members of the family Restionaceae between Cathcart and Majors Creek in southern New South Wales.
