= Cann River East Branch =

- Confluence of the Cann River East Branch with the Cann River, in Victoria.

Location
- Country: Australia
- State: Victoria
- Region: South East Corner (IBRA), East Gippsland
- Local government area: Shire of East Gippsland

Physical characteristics
- Source: Mount Coopracambra
  - location: Chandlers Creek
  - elevation: 257 m (843 ft)
- Mouth: confluence with the Cann River
  - location: near Weeragua
  - coordinates: 37°22′19″S 149°11′57″E
  - elevation: 161 m (528 ft)
- Length: 10 km (6.2 mi)

Basin features
- Tributaries
  - left: Flat Rock Creek, Beehive Creek
  - right: Fiddlers Green Creek
- National park: Coopracambra NP

The Cann River East Branch is a perennial river located in the East Gippsland region of the Australian state of Victoria.

== Course and features ==
The Cann River East Branch rises southwest of Mount Coopracambra in remote country on the western boundary of the Coopracambra National Park and flows generally south, joined by three minor tributaries before reaching its confluence with the Cann River, south of the locality of Weeragua in the Shire of East Gippsland. The river descends 97 metres (318 ft) over its 10 kilometres (6.2 mi) course.

The Monaro Highway runs parallel to the course of the river.

== See also ==
- East Gippsland Catchment Management Authority
- List of rivers of Australia
