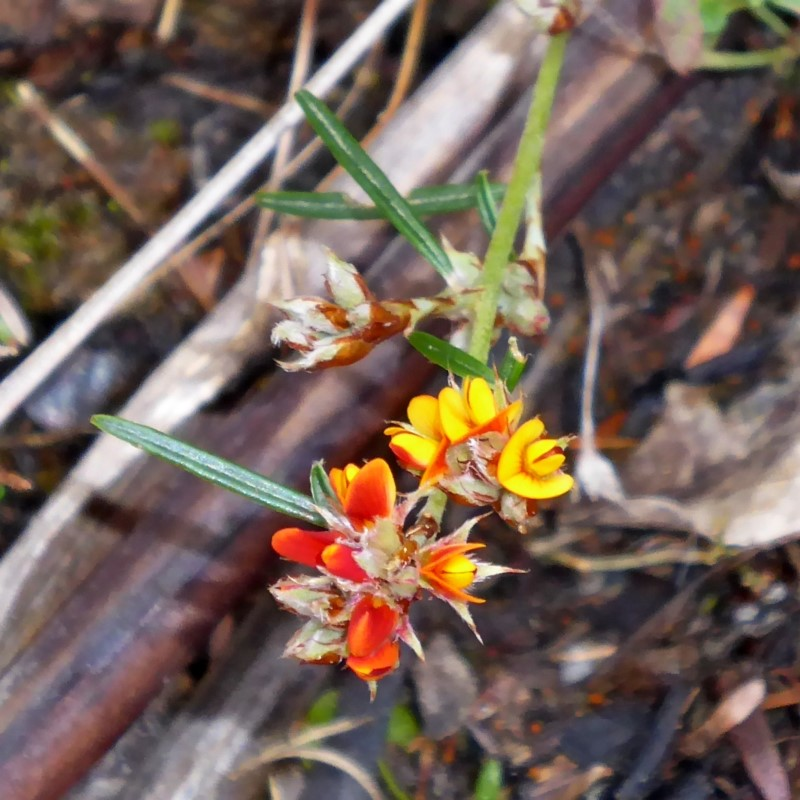
- In Mount Imlay National Park

Conservation status
- Vulnerable (EPBC Act)

Scientific classification
- Kingdom: Plantae
- Clade: Tracheophytes
- Clade: Angiosperms
- Clade: Eudicots
- Clade: Rosids
- Order: Fabales
- Family: Fabaceae
- Subfamily: Faboideae
- Genus: Pultenaea
- Species: P. parrisiae

Binomial name
- Pultenaea parrisiae J.D.Briggs & Crisp

= Pultenaea parrisiae =

Bantam bush-pea

Species of legume

Pultenaea parrisiae, commonly known as bantam bush-pea, or Parris's bush-pea, is a species of flowering plant in the family Fabaceae and is endemic to south eastern continental Australia. It is a low-lying sub-shrub with linear to lance-shaped leaves with the narrower end towards the base, and yellow to purple flowers with red markings.

== Description ==
Pultenaea parrisiae is small, low-lying sub-shrub with a few trailing stems 30–40 mm (1.2–1.6 in) long. The leaves are arranged alternately, linear to lance-shaped with the narrower end towards the base, 4–14 mm (0.16–0.55 in) long and 0.8–2.5 mm (0.031–0.098 in) wide on a very short petiole, with brown stipules 3–7 mm (0.12–0.28 in) long at the base. The edges of the leaves are curved downwards and the upper surface is concave. The flowers are arranged in dense clusters of four to seven on the ends of branches and are 5–7 mm (0.20–0.28 in) long, each flower on a pedicel 0.4–1.5 mm (0.016–0.059 in) long with egg-shaped to elliptic bracts 4–9 mm (0.16–0.35 in) long at the base. The sepals are 3.5–6 mm (0.14–0.24 in) long and joined at the base forming a tube 2.0–2.7 mm (0.079–0.106 in) long, with bracteoles 3.0–3.6 mm (0.12–0.14 in) long attached to the side of the sepal tube. The standard petal is yellow with a reddish base and 3–4 mm (0.12–0.16 in) wide, the wings are yellow to orange and 4–5 mm (0.16–0.20 in) wide and the keel is mostly dark reddish. Flowering mostly occurs from October to November and the fruit is a flattened pod 4–5 mm (0.16–0.20 in) long.

== Taxonomy ==
Pultenaea parrisiae was first formally described in 1994 by John D. Briggs and Michael Crisp in the journal Telopea from specimens collected by Briggs in Wadbilliga National Park in 1988. The specific epithet (parrisiae) honours the amateur botanist, Mrs Margaret Parris who drew the attention of Briggs and Crisp to the species.

== Distribution and habitat ==
Bantam bush-pea grows in moist heathland, sometimes at forest edges or near streams in the South East Forests and Wadbilliga National Parks in far south-eastern New South Wales and north-east Gippsland in Victoria.

== Conservation status ==
Pultenaea parrisiae is listed as "vulnerable" under the Australian Government Environment Protection and Biodiversity Conservation Act 1999, the New South Wales Government Biodiversity Conservation Act 2016 and the Victorian Government Flora and Fauna Guarantee Act 1988.
