= Pomaderris sericea =

Conservation status
- Vulnerable (EPBC Act)

Scientific classification
- Kingdom: Plantae
- Clade: Tracheophytes
- Clade: Angiosperms
- Clade: Eudicots
- Clade: Rosids
- Order: Rosales
- Family: Rhamnaceae
- Genus: Pomaderris
- Species: P. sericea

Binomial name
- Pomaderris sericea N.A.Wakef.

Species of plant

Pomaderris sericea, commonly known as bent pomaderris or silky pomaderris, is a species of flowering plant in the family Rhamnaceae and is endemic to south-eastern continental Australia. It is a shrub with silky-hairy new growth, narrowly elliptic leaves and panicles of yellow flowers. It is only known from three small populations and has not been seen since 1997.

== Description ==
Pomaderris sericea is a shrub that typically grows to a height of up to 2 m (6 ft 7 in), its new growth covered with silky, golden-brown hairs. The leaves are narrowly elliptic, 6–30 mm (0.24–1.18 in) long and 4–10 mm (0.16–0.39 in) wide, the upper surface of the leaves more or less glabrous, the lower surface covered with silky, golden-brown hairs. The flowers are yellow, borne in pyramid-shaped panicles 10–30 mm (0.39–1.18 in) long and wide, the floral cup, and sepals covered with whitish simple and star-shaped hairs. Flowering has been recorded in October and the fruit is a hairy capsule.

== Taxonomy ==
Pomaderris sericea was first formally described in 1951 by Norman Arthur Wakefield in The Victorian Naturalist from specimens he collected near the upper Genoa River Victoria in 1949. The specific epithet (sericea) means "silky".

== Distribution and habitat ==
Bent pomaderris is only known from small populations in New South Wales and Victoria where it is thought to grow in low shrubland, open forest or near the base of cliffs. The New South Wales records are from Wollemi National Park and Morton National Park and the Victorian records from Coopracambra National Park, but the species has not been recorded since 1997.

== Conservation status ==
Pomaderris sericea is listed as "vulnerable" under the Australian Government Environment Protection and Biodiversity Conservation Act 1999 and the Victorian Government Flora and Fauna Guarantee Act 1988 and as "endangered" under the New South Wales Government Biodiversity Conservation Act 2016. The main threats to the species are its small population size, limited distribution and inappropriate fire regimes.
