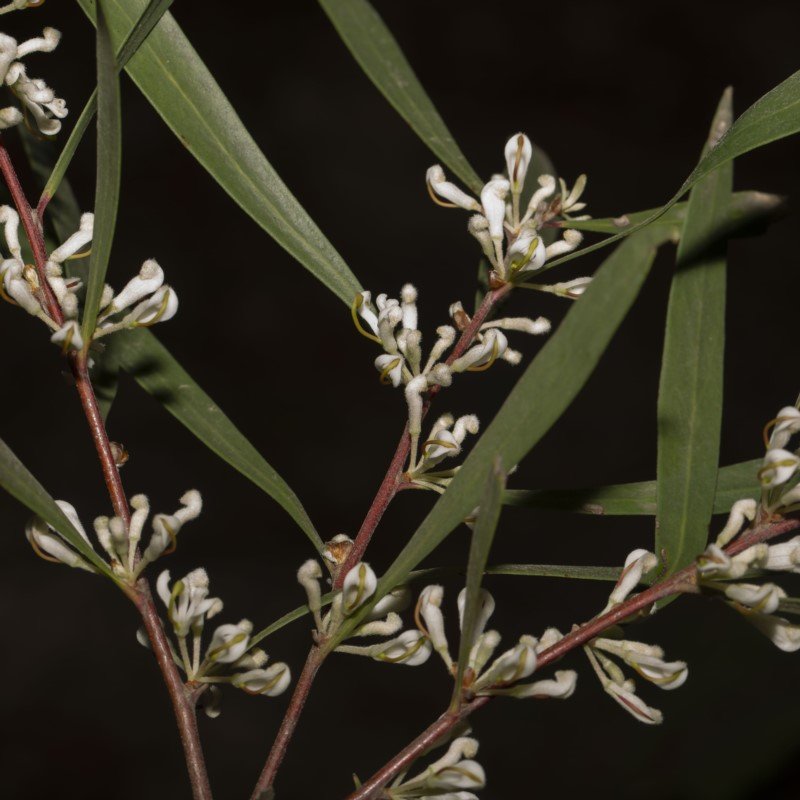
- Near Cathcart

Scientific classification
- Kingdom: Plantae
- Clade: Tracheophytes
- Clade: Angiosperms
- Clade: Eudicots
- Order: Proteales
- Family: Proteaceae
- Genus: Hakea
- Species: H. eriantha

Binomial name
- Hakea eriantha R.Br.
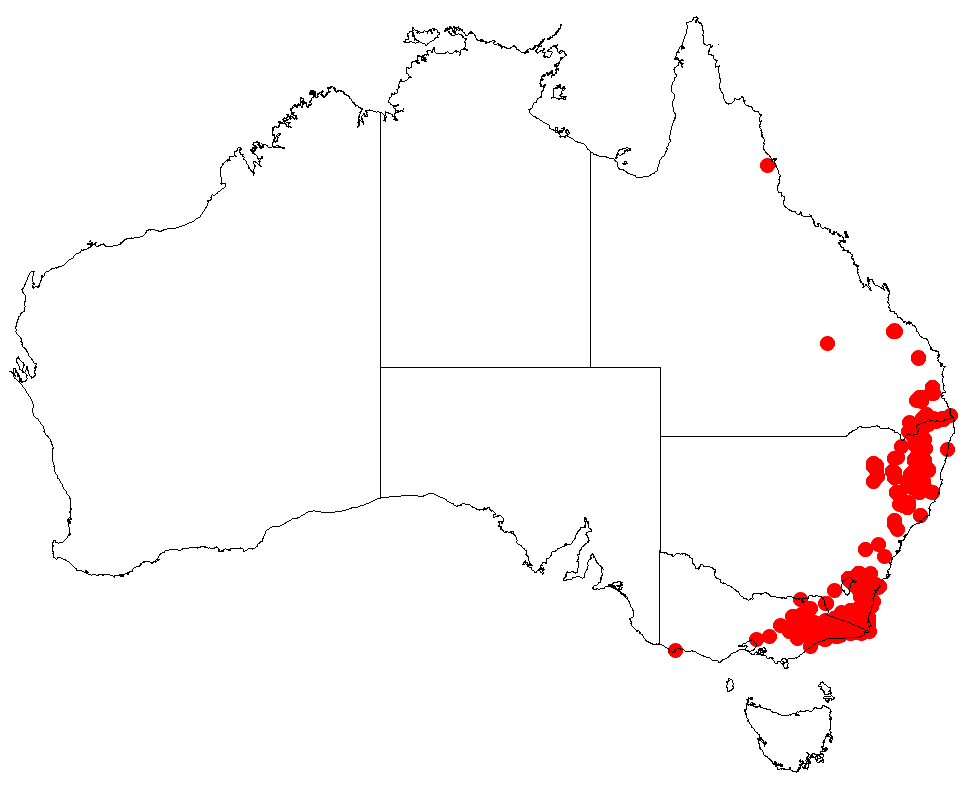
- Occurrence data from AVH

= Hakea eriantha =

Tree hakea

Species of plant endemic to eastern Australia

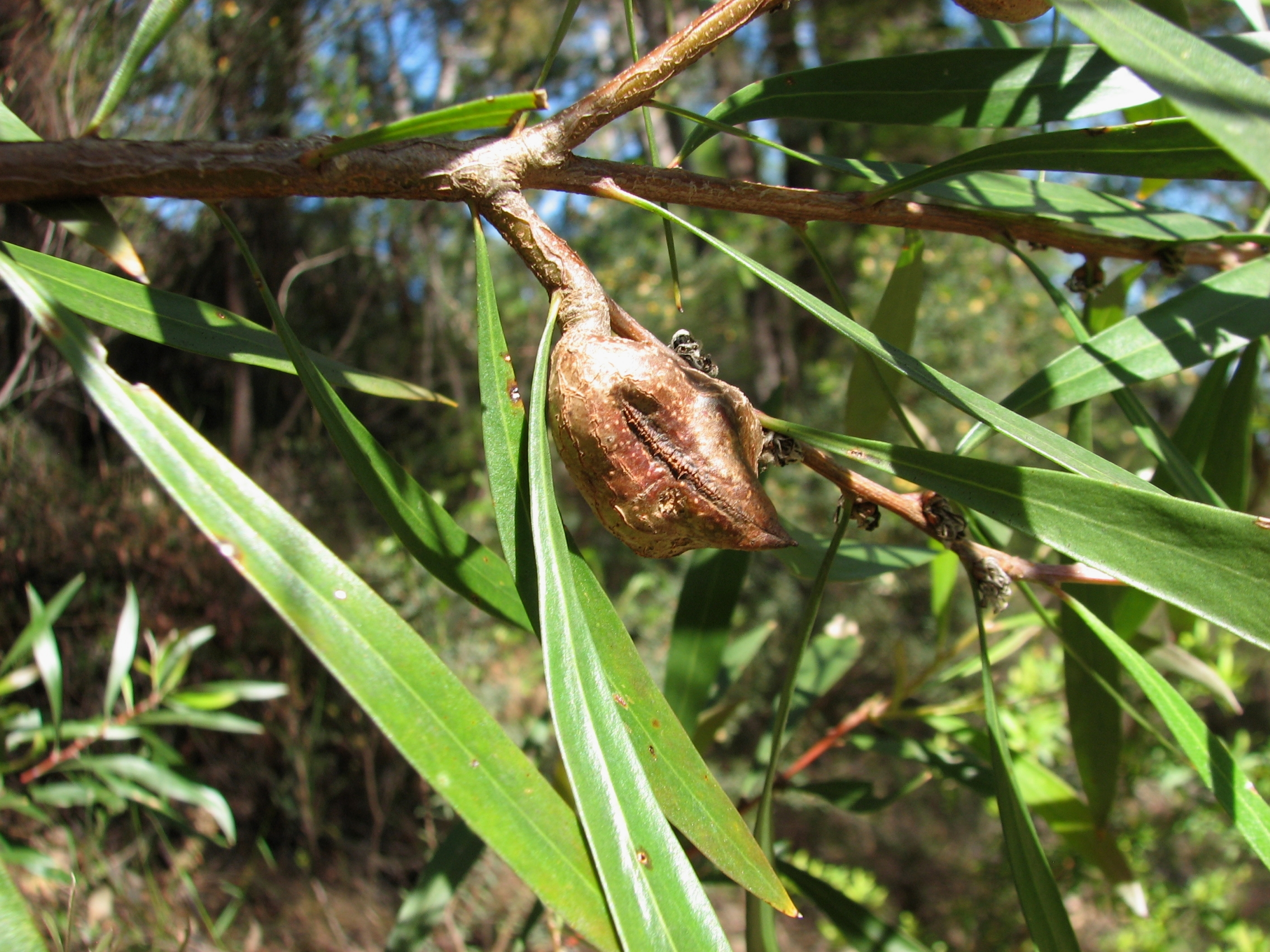
Leaves and fruit

Hakea eriantha, commonly known as tree hakea, is a shrub or small tree endemic to the east coast of Australia. It has white flowers on a woolly stem in leaf axils, long narrow leaves with reddish new growth. Found growing at higher altitudes in moist or sclerophyll Eucalyptus woodland.

== Description ==
Hakea eriantha is a dense non lignotuberous shrub or small tree 1–5 m (3.3–16 ft) tall. Leaves are linear to egg-shaped and 8 to 18.5 cm long and 1 to 30 mm wide. Young leaves are either smooth or with flattened fine hairs, ending with a sharp short point 0.5–1.5 mm (0.020–0.059 in) long. The inflorescence consists of 6-10 cream flowers on a stalk about 2.5–3.5 mm (0.098–0.14 in) long, they appear in the leaf axils. The pedicel is 2.5–6 mm (0.098–0.24 in) long and densely covered with white soft hairs extending onto the lower part of the flower. The white perianth is 3.5–6.5 mm (0.14–0.26 in) long and the style 7–8.5 mm (0.28–0.33 in) long. between August and November. The woody fruit is smooth 1.9–3.2 mm (0.075–0.13 in) long and about 1.2–1.6 mm (0.047–0.063 in) wide with brown blister-like protuberances ending with a short sharp point 3.5–4.5 mm (0.14–0.18 in) long. It is wrinkled and has beak that is about 3 mm long.

== Taxonomy and naming ==
Hakea eriantha was first formally described in 1830 by botanist Robert Brown from a specimen collected near the Hastings River by Charles Fraser. The description was published in an addendum to the Supplementum primum Prodromi florae Novae Hollandiae. The specific epithet (eriantha) is derived from the Ancient Greek words erion meaning "wool" and anthos meaning "flower" referring to the hairy flowers of this hakea.

== Distribution and habitat ==
Tree hakea occurs in Eucalyptus woodland or forest and the edge of rainforest from Gladstone in Queensland, southward to Gippsland in Victoria.

== Use in horticulture ==
Hakea eriantha is a fast growing species, suitable for wet cold climates as a screening or hedging plant. A food source for the gang-gang cockatoo (Calocephalon fimbriatum) as they share a similar habitat. Also preferred in some districts by the yellow-tailed black cockatoo (Calyptorhynchus funereus) as a food source.
