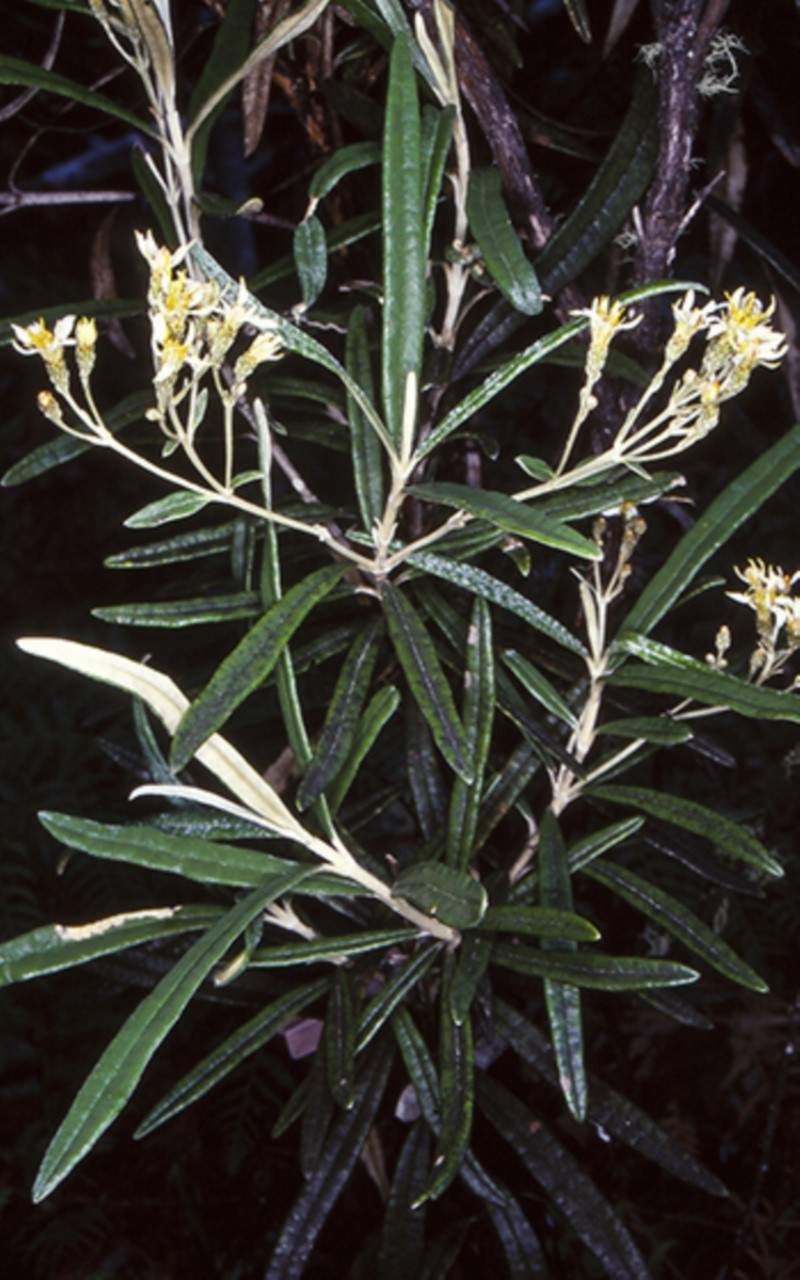
- In South East Forests National Park

Scientific classification
- Kingdom: Plantae
- Clade: Tracheophytes
- Clade: Angiosperms
- Clade: Eudicots
- Clade: Asterids
- Order: Asterales
- Family: Asteraceae
- Genus: Olearia
- Species: O. alpicola

Binomial name
- Olearia alpicola (F.Muell.) Benth.

Synonyms
- Aster alpicola (F.Muell.) F.Muell.; Eurybia alpicola F.Muell.; Eurybia alpicola F.Muell. var. alpicola; Olearia alpicola F.Muell. nom. inval., pro syn.; Olearia alpicola (F.Muell.) Benth. var. alpicola

= Olearia alpicola =

Species of shrub

Olearia alpicola, commonly known as alpine daisy bush, is a species of flowering plant in the family Asteraceae and is found in mountainous terrain in New South Wales and Victoria in Australia. It is an open shrub with spreading branches and white daisy-like inflorescences.

== Description ==
Olearia alpicola is an open spreading shrub to 2.5 m (8.2 ft) high. The branchlets are densely covered with T-shaped hairs. The leaves are oblong to egg-shaped, 25–130 mm (0.98–5.1 in) long and about 3–23 mm (0.12–0.91 in) wide and arranged sparsely in opposite pairs. The leaf upper surface is green, smooth and the margin entire. The underside is covered in densely matted short white-grey hairs with a network of veins, ending in either a blunt or pointed apex. The leaf is on a petiole 12 mm (0.47 in) long. The inflorescence is a cluster of 6-7 white flowers 19–24 mm (0.75–0.94 in) in diameter at the end of branches on a stalk 19–24 mm (0.75–0.94 in) long. The 4-6 overlapping bracts are conical shaped, arranged in rows, edges fringed and sometimes a purplish colour. The floret centre is yellow. The one-seeded fruit is narrowly egg-shaped 2–3.5 mm (0.079–0.14 in) long, mostly smooth or with a few dense silky white to pale yellowish hairs 5–8 mm (0.20–0.31 in) long at the apex.

== Taxonomy and naming ==
This species was first formally described in 1860 by Ferdinand von Mueller who gave it the name Eurybia alpicola and published the description in Papers and Proceedings of the Royal Society of Van Diemen's Land. In 1867, George Bentham changed the name to Olearia alpicola. The specific epithet (alpicola) means "dweller in high mountains.

== Distribution and habitat ==
The alpine daisy-bush grows in damp mountainous situations and dry sclerophyll forests of the eastern ranges in Victoria and south of Ebor and to the Warrumbungle Ranges in New South Wales.
