= Monaro Highway =

Highway in Australia

Monaro Highway Victoria–Australian Capital Territory
- Map of the far southeast of Australia, with Monaro Highway highlighted in red

General information
- Type: Highway
- Length: 285.1 km (177 mi)
- Gazetted: March 1914 (VIC, as Main Road); August 1928 (NSW, as Main Roads 52 and 53); March 1938 (NSW, as State Highway 19); August 1960 (VIC, as State Highway)
- Route number(s): B23 (1998/2013–present) (Cann River–NSW/ACT border); A23 (2013–present) (ACT/NSW border–Fyshwick); M23 (2016–present) (Fyshwick–Pialligo); Concurrency: B72 (2013–present) (Steeple Flat–Cooma)
- Former route number: National Route 23 (1962–1998/2013) (Cann River–Fyshwick); Alternative National Route 23 (1991–2016) (Fyshwick–Pialligo); ACT Tourist Drive 5 (Calwell–Fyshwick)

Major junctions
- South end: Princes Highway; Cann River, Victoria
- Snowy Mountains Highway; Hindmarsh Drive; Canberra Avenue
- North end: Majura Parkway; Pialligo, Australian Capital Territory

Location(s)
- Major settlements: Cann River, Bombala, Nimmitabel, Cooma, Tuggeranong, South Canberra

Highway system
- Highways in Australia; National Highway • Freeways in Australia; Highways in Victoria; Highways in New South Wales; Road infrastructure in Canberra

The Monaro Highway is a 285-kilometre-long (177 mi) highway in Victoria, New South Wales, and the Australian Capital Territory, in Australia, linking Cann River in Victoria to Canberra in the Australian Capital Territory (ACT) via the Monaro region. From its southern terminus, it follows the nearby Cann River upstream towards the New South Wales border through heavily forested terrain. Within New South Wales (NSW), it makes its way through further forest before reaching the pastures typical of the Monaro.

There are multiple towns and villages along the highway, including Bombala, Nimmitabel and Cooma. The terrain within the Monaro is largely hilly, and there are numerous crossings. The road also parallels the former Bombala railway line in several locations. Within the ACT, the road becomes a high volume roadway and serves the southern suburbs of Canberra. The highway has more recently had a grade-separated dual carriageway extension constructed within Canberra, as part of the Eastern Parkway construction project. It is designated part of route M23, and route A23 within Canberra, and route B23 within Victoria and New South Wales, with a concurrency where it also carries route B72 between the two sections of Snowy Mountains Highway.

== Route ==
=== Victoria ===
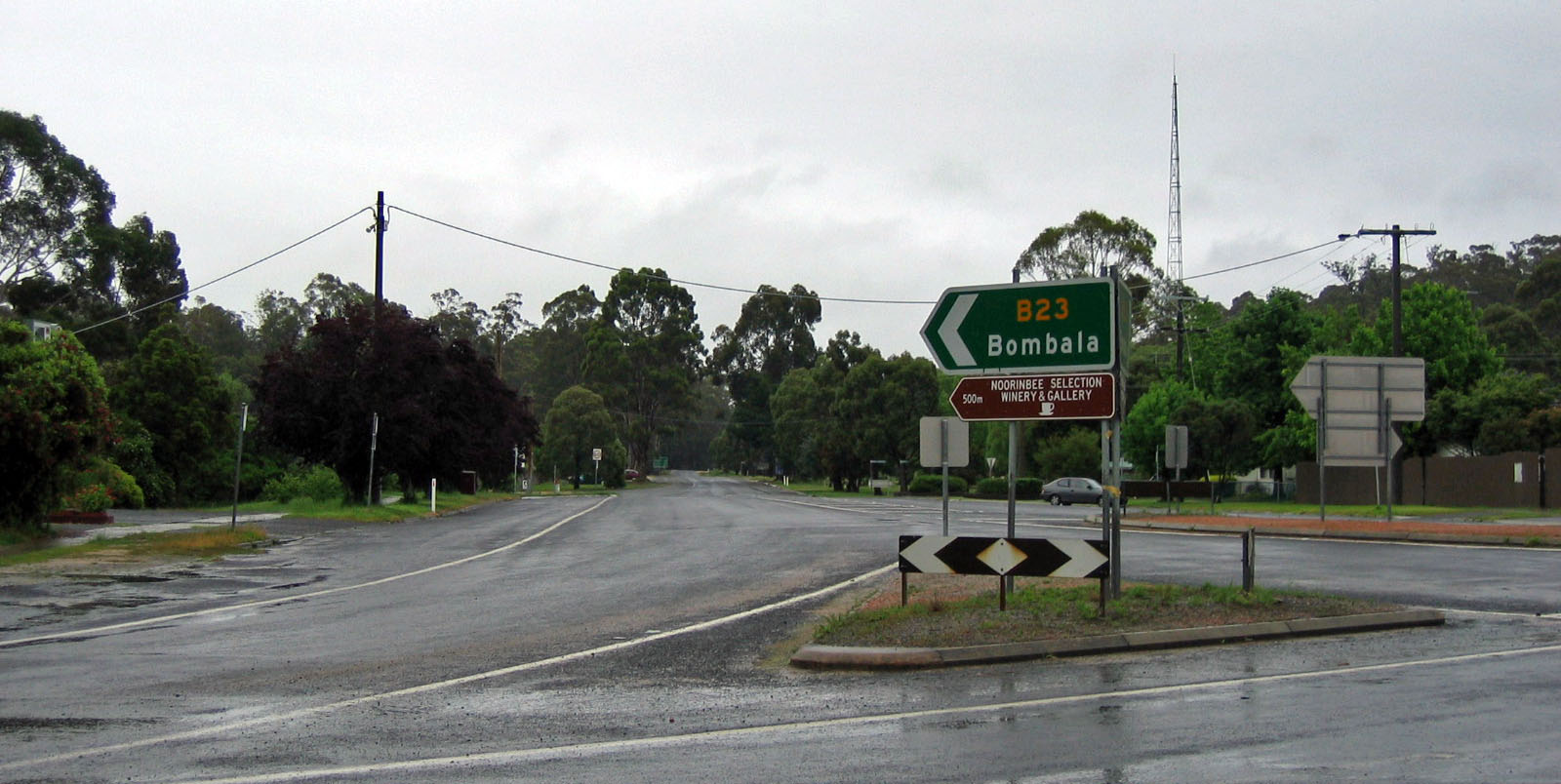
The southern terminus of Monaro Highway in Cann River, at its junction with Princes Highway.

Monaro Highway begins at the intersection with Princes Highway in Cann River in the East Gippsland region. After leaving the town, it heads north along a relatively flat area following the Cann River upstream through a locality known as Noorinbee. To the west is farmland between the road and river and a mountain range beyond and to the east are some smaller hills. The land to the east is largely part of Drummer State Forest. As the sides close in at the northern end of this wider valley area, the highway crosses to the west bank of the river highway and enters the Noorinbee North locality. Continuing north, the terrain is more hilly and forested and the alignment more closely parallels the winding river upstream to the area of Weeragua. At this point, the land to the west of the river is part of Buldah State Forest, and to the east is Coopracambra National Park. The road has now entered the Chandlers Creek locality and at Weeragua, the road crosses the west branch of the Cann River and continues further north along the east branch through a small farmland area. From here, it follows the river through more forest before coming to another small farmland area and crossing Chandlers Creek itself. The road once again enters forest as it follows the Cann River east branch to its upper end at the confluence of Fiddlers Green Creek and Flat Rock Creek, the latter of which the road follows through Coopracambra National Park to the New South Wales border.

=== New South Wales ===
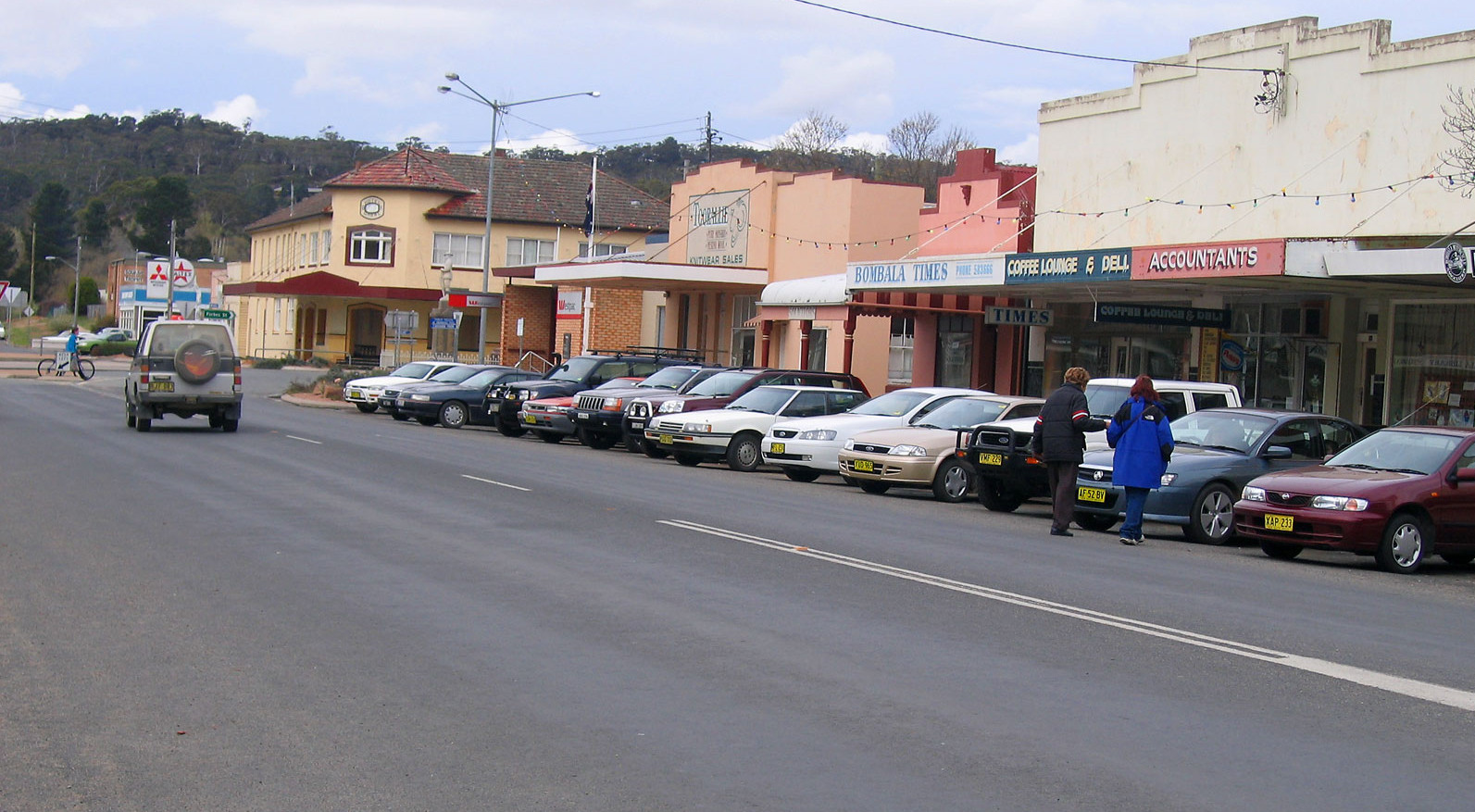
Monaro Highway in Bombala (as Maybe Street)

From the state border, Monaro Highway continues north through forest, generally keeping Bondi State Forest to the west and South East Forest National Park to the east. The immediate landscape by the roadside also includes the occasional small tract of farmland at several points. There is a crossing over the Genoa River within the forest, and the road roughly follows it upstream. Upon exiting the large forested area that exists near the border, the road enters farmland. This farmland continues as a patchwork of pastures for the rest of the journey within New South Wales and is only interrupted by the occasional town. The road continues roughly northwest until it meets Delegate Road at a T-intersection just outside Bombala. Turning towards the northeast at the intersection, the road quickly reaches Bombala. Within the urban area, the road firstly takes on the name Maybe Street. It then turns northeast at Forbes Street and crosses over the Bombala River. After the bridge, the road returns to a northeast heading as Mahratta Street. This street continues for a short distance before a right angle bend to the northwest to match the same manoeuvre by the river. The road then becomes Stephen Street before returning to the Monaro Highway name at the edge of the urban area and concluding its zig-zag trajectory through Bombala.

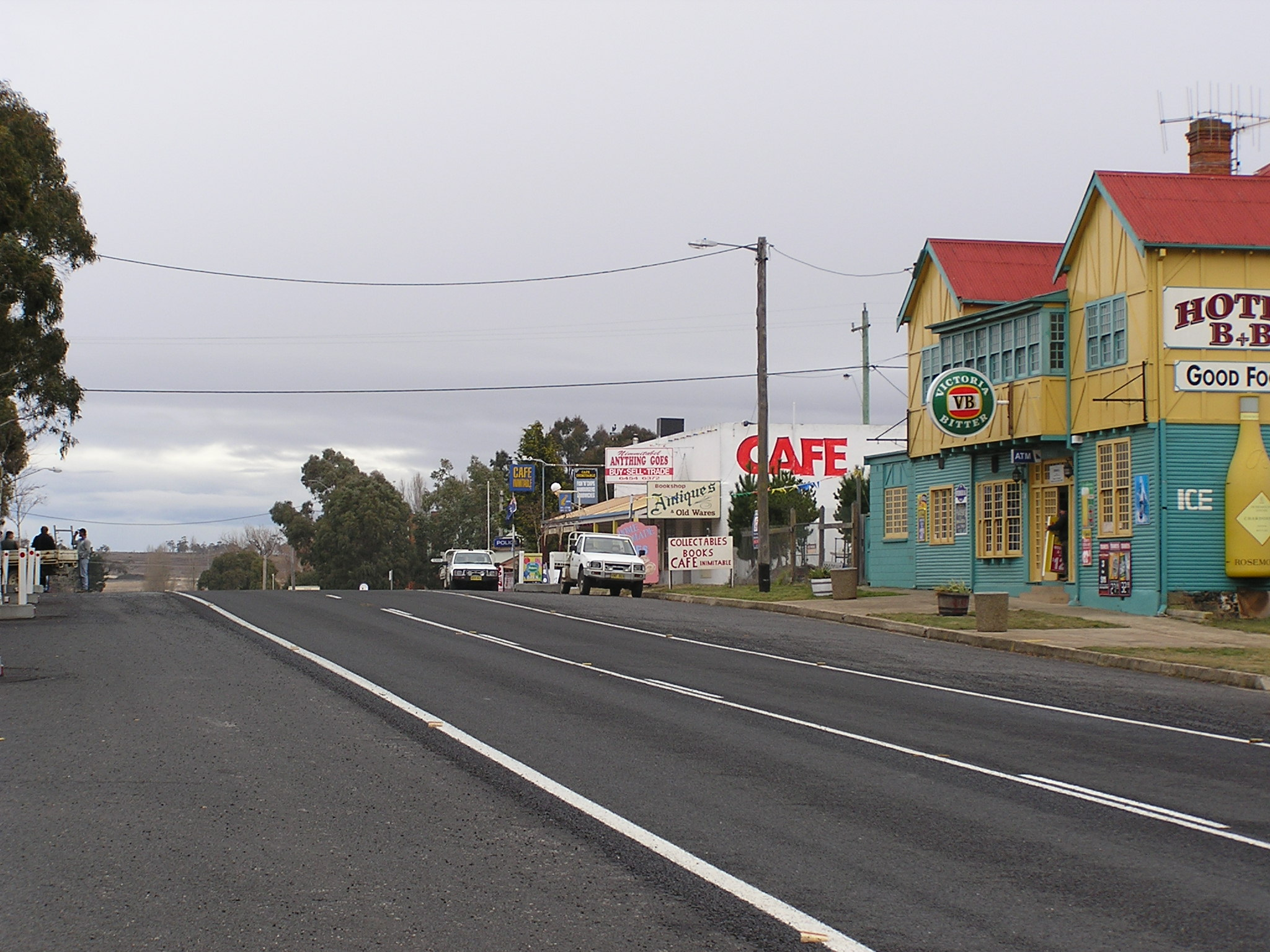
Monaro Highway in Nimmitabel (as Bombala Street)

The highway then travels in a north-easterly direction, crossing the Bombala River again and making its way towards Bibbenluke. The road bypasses the village just to its west and makes a further crossing of the Bombala River. Continuing north, the road winds its way towards a ridge near Native Dog Creek. After crossing the creek, the road climbs the ridge and continues northbound. At this point, the former Bombala railway line alignment winds along the western side and is visible in some locations. Eventually the road swings east and meets the western end of the eastern section of the Snowy Mountains Highway at another T-intersection. The highway turns towards the northwest at this intersection and, after a short distance, crosses the Maclaughlin River. A little further along this heading, the road enters Nimmitabel. The highway takes on the name Bombala Street within the urban area and swings to the northeast through the small town. From here, the road continues northwest once again with the railway alignment never far to the west and sometimes paralleling the road. The road crosses several small creeks along this stretch of road. Before reaching Cooma, the road also passes to the west of Kuma Nature Reserve and crosses over the former Bombala railway line. Within the town of Cooma, the road initially takes up the name Bombala Street. Where this street meets Sharp Street at a 4-way roundabout, the highway turns east, while the western section of Snowy Mountains Highway begins from the same point and heads west. Continuing east as Sharp Street, the road soon curves north and transitions back to Monaro Highway. It then parallels the railway within the urban area and also passes by the Tadeusz Kościuszko Monument as it leaves the town.

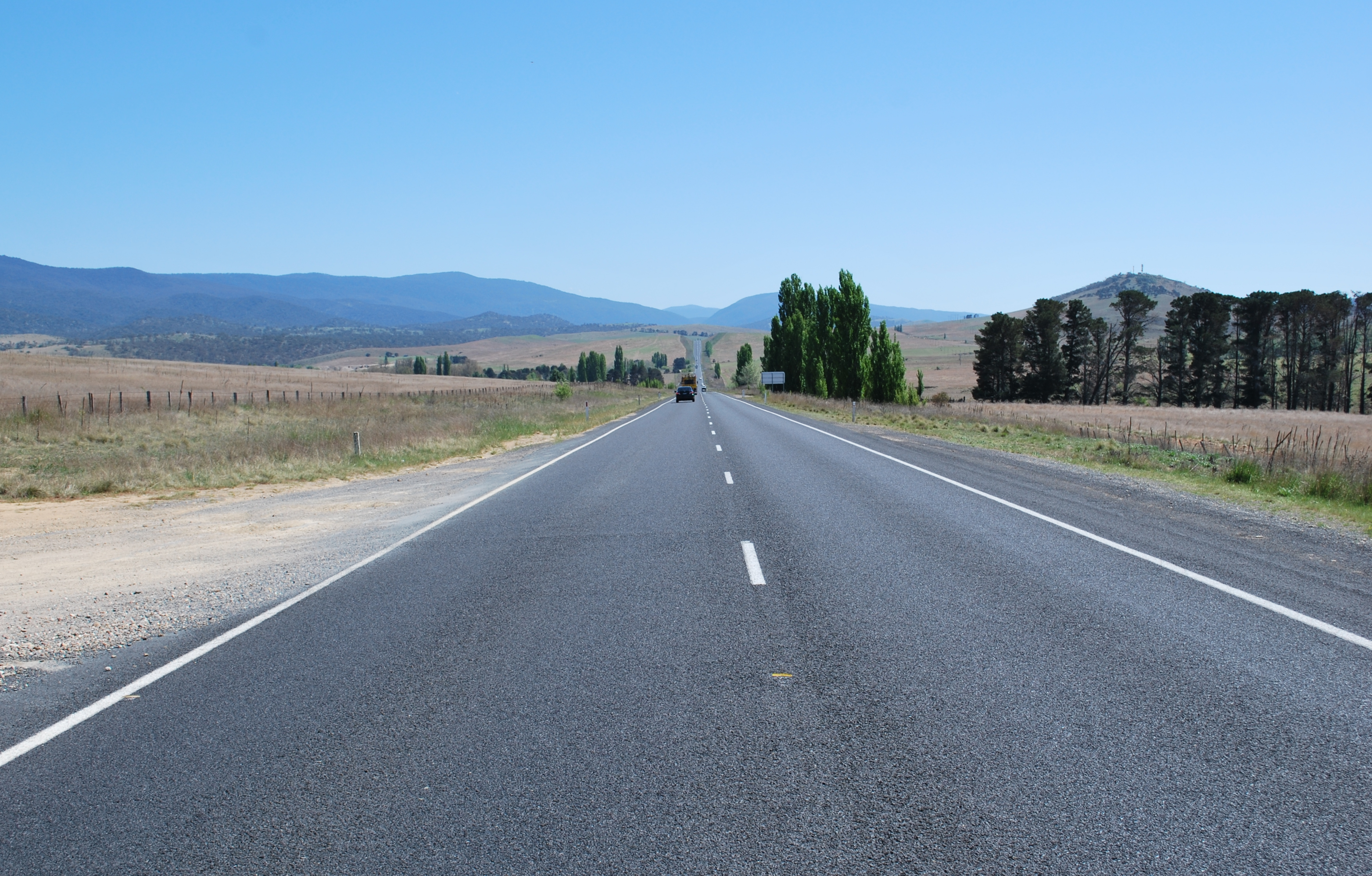
Heading north along Monaro Highway, between Cooma and Bredbo

North of Cooma, the highway follows the same general path as the railway alignment as far as the area of Bunyan. From there, it continues along the same rough heading and crosses the Numeralla River just prior to its confluence with the Murrumbidgee River. The road then follows the Murrumbidgee downstream at some distance to its east. The highway continues on towards Bredbo and crosses the Bredbo River as it enters the village. The highway takes on the name Cooma Street through Bredbo and crosses over the railway yet again just north of the town. Further to the north, the road passes through Gungoandra Gap to the east of Round Hill. Mount Colinton is now visible to the highway's east, and a larger range known as the Clear Range is visible to west. The ridgeline of the Clear Range forms the eastern border of the ACT in this area. Heading further downstream, continuing the distant parallel of the Murrumbidgee, the road enters Michelago and crosses the railway a final few times as the railway winds through the area. It does not enter the urban area of Michelago itself and instead passes to the west of the village. North of Michelago the road and railway parallel each other very closely as they head towards the ACT border at the north end of the Clear Range. The road crosses the border just east of Cunningham Hill.

=== Australian Capital Territory ===
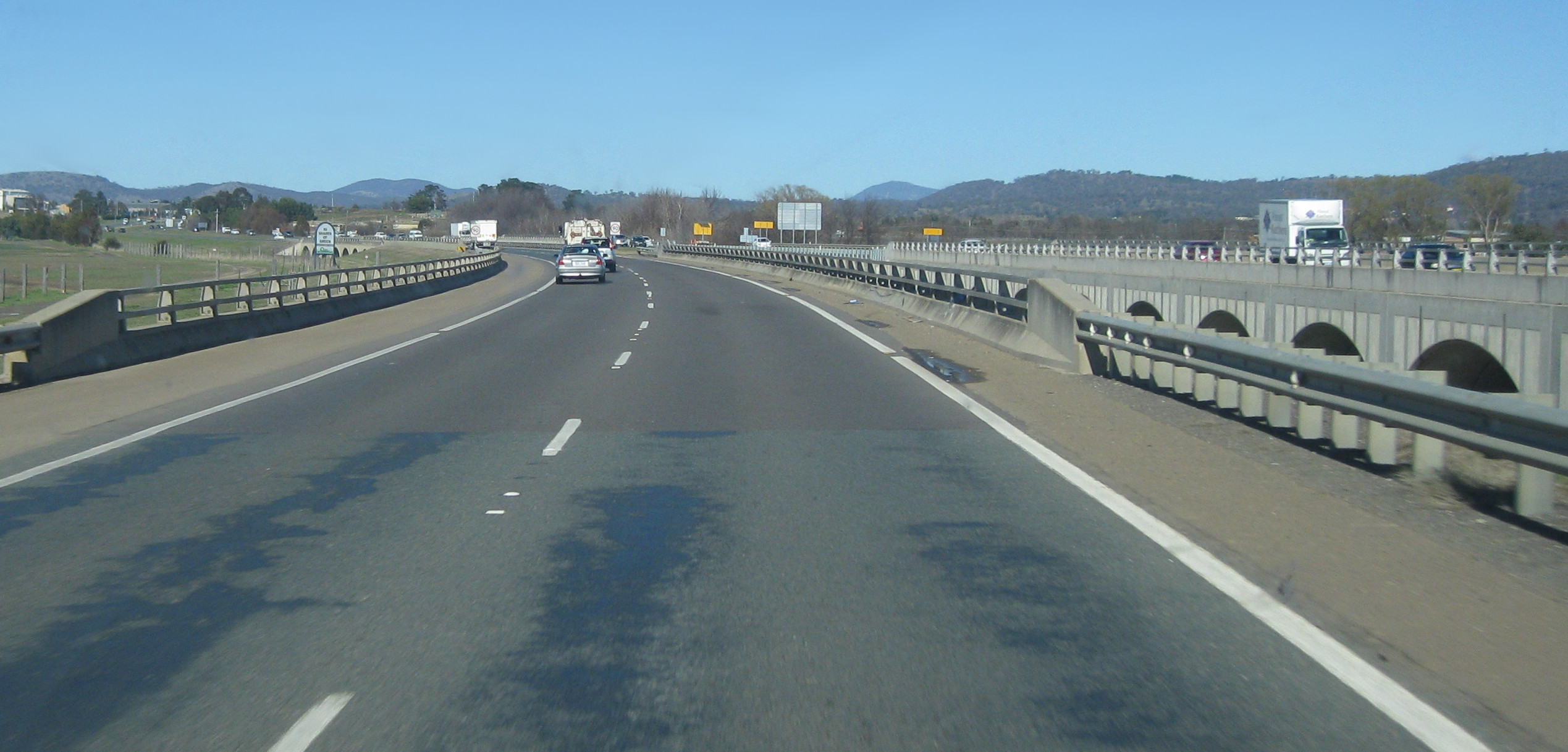
Heading south along Monaro Highway, at Fyshwick

From the territory border, the road passes into the rural southern reaches of the Tuggeranong District. In this area of the ACT, the railway line forms the eastern border of the territory, with the railway line itself situated on the NSW side. To the western side of the road flows Guises Creek, with a range of hills beyond it, Rose Hill and Mount Rob Roy being two of the more prominent peaks. As the road reaches the Tuggeranong urban area, it begins to parallel the urban area instead and forms part of the border of Tuggeranong's eastern suburbs. Approaching the Tharwa Drive intersection, the road becomes a dual carriageway. The road climbs onto a small ridge with views of the urban area to the west and the Tuggeranong Pine Plantation to the east. The road then descends towards the Jerrabomberra district border where it meets Isabella Drive, and then passes through the light industrial suburb of Hume, although the land to the west of the road is largely undeveloped. Within Hume, the road meets Lanyon Drive, which heads across the nearby border towards Jerrabomberra and Queanbeyan.

The road then continues roughly north and crosses a largely open area of pasture. The SouthCare emergency helicopter is stationed to the east of the road not far after its intersection with Lanyon Drive, and further on, a prison, the Alexander Maconochie Centre, is located to the west. Approaching the northern end of the pasture, Jerrabomberra Creek flows to the east. At the northern end is the Hindmarsh Drive interchange. The highway passes underneath Hindmarsh Drive and continues over Jerrabomberra Creek, before then passing over an interchange with Canberra Avenue (where it is designated route M23), along with an overpass above the Canberra railway line branch, and an interchange above Newcastle Street. Monaro Highway is then carried across a flood plain above farmland on concrete drainage channels, before crossing the Molonglo River over the Malcolm Fraser Bridge where it becomes Majura Parkway, continuing on until it meets Federal Highway near Goorooyaroo Nature Reserve.

== History ==
=== Early roads ===
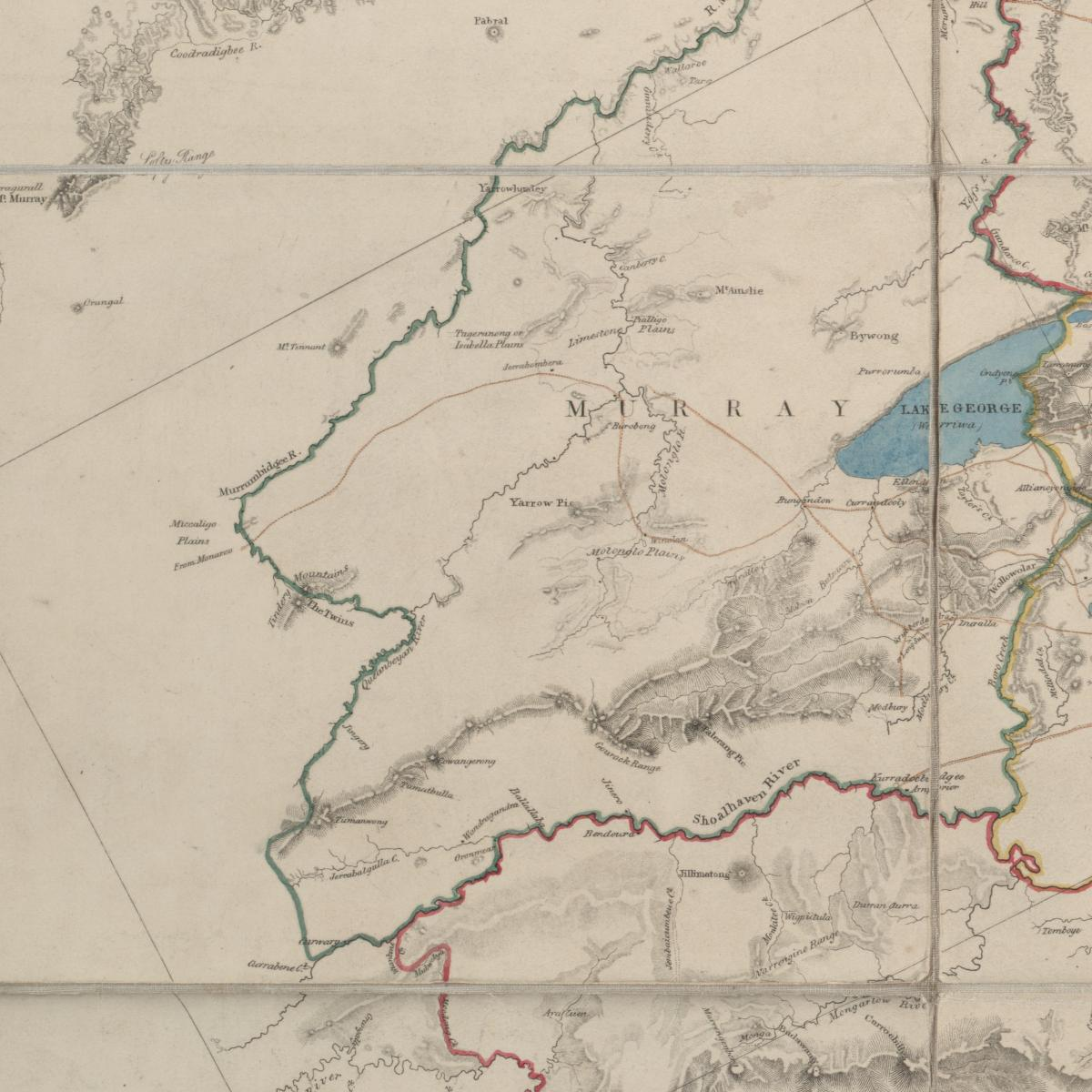
Road depicted in Thomas Mitchell's 1834 map (Note: Top of image is roughly northwest)

A minor road appeared in this region on Thomas Mitchell's 1834 map of the Nineteen Counties of New South Wales. Located within Murray county, the road continued from Bungendore towards the south before turning west crossing the Queanbeyan River near its confluence with the Molonglo River (the current location of Queanbeyan), which then headed south towards what was then known as the "Miccaligo Plains" (now Michelago). The road is then marked as continuing south beyond the border of the county; although no settlement could legally occur beyond the Nineteen Counties at that time, those who settled beyond this area were known as squatters. The detail of the road beyond Murray county is not plotted on the map. By 1844 the road had reached Cooma, and was extended to Bombala by 1852. Mapping from 1882 shows the road had extended all the way to the Victorian border, crossing near Delegate.

=== Highway ===
==== Victoria ====
Within Victoria, the passing of the Country Roads Act 1912 through the Parliament of Victoria provided for the establishment of the Country Roads Board (later VicRoads) and their ability to declare Main Roads, taking responsibility for the management, construction and care of the state's major roads from local municipalities. Cann Valley Road was declared a Main Road from Cann River to the border with New South Wales on 23 March 1914.

The passing of the Developmental Roads Act 1918 through the Parliament of Victoria allowed the Country Road Board to declare Developmental Roads, serving to develop any area of land by providing access to a railway station for primary producers. Cann Valley Road was subsequently reclassified as a Developmental Road on 14 January 1920.

The passing of the Highways and Vehicles Act 1924 provided for the declaration of State Highways, roads two-thirds financed by the state government through the Country Roads Board. Cann Valley Highway was declared a State Highway on 10 August 1960, from Cann River to the border with New South Wales (for a total of 27.5 miles), subsuming the original declaration of Cann Valley Road as a Developmental Road.

As part of the Bicentennial Road Development Programme, the roadway was sealed along its entire length, the project being completed in March 1985. It was renamed Monaro Highway on 25 October 1996, to match the highway to which it connects at the NSW border.

The passing of the Road Management Act 2004 granted the responsibility of overall management and development of Victoria's major arterial roads to VicRoads: in 2004, VicRoads re-declared the road as Monaro Highway (Arterial #6760), beginning at Cann River and ending at the New South Wales border in Chandlers Creek.

==== New South Wales ====
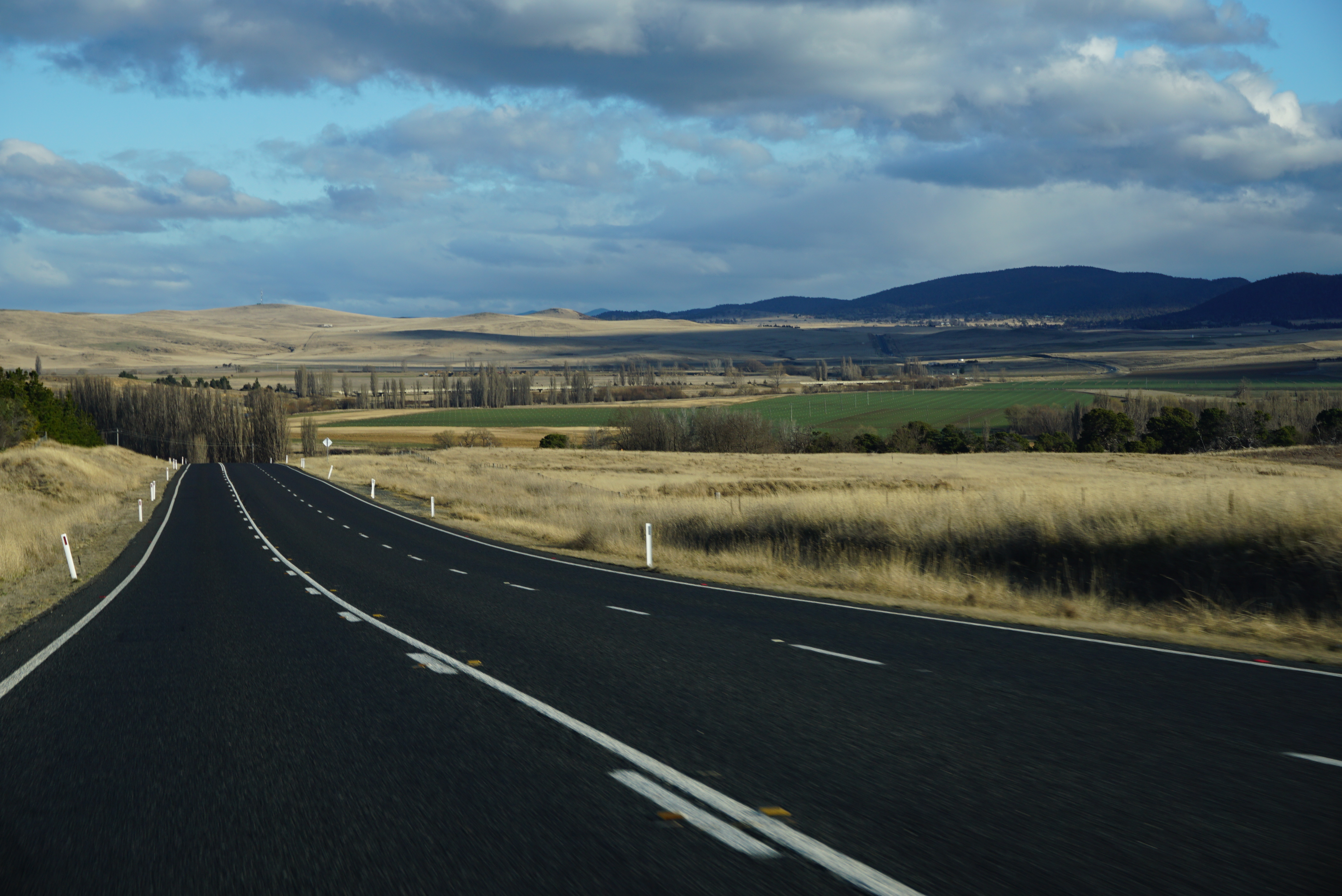
Monaro Highway near Cooma

The passing of the Main Roads Act 1924 through the Parliament of New South Wales provided for the declaration of Main Roads, roads partially funded by the State government through the Main Roads Board (later Transport for NSW), later amended by the passing of the Main Roads (Amendment) Act 1929 to provide for the additional declarations of State Highways and Trunk Roads.

The roads forming the future highway were given the following classifications on 8 August 1928:

- Main Road No. 53 from the Victorian border via Delegate to Nimmitabel, amended to Trunk Road 53 in 1929;
- Main Road No. 4 from Nimmitabel to Cooma, amended to State Highway 4 in 1929;
- Main Road No. 52 from Cooma via Royalla and Queanbeyan to the ACT border, amended to Trunk Road 52 in 1929.

State Highway 4 was actually named Monaro Highway at the time, which ran from Tathra to Wagga Wagga.

The Department of Main Roads, which had succeeded the New South Wales MRB in 1932, declared State Highway 19 on 16 March 1938, from Canberra via Royalla and Bredbo to the intersection with State Highway 4 at Cooma, and from the intersection with State Highway 4 at Nimmitabel via Bombala and Delegate to connect with Bonang Highway at the state border with Victoria, subsuming Trunk Road 53; the southern end of Trunk Road 52 was truncated to meet State Highway 19 at Royalla, as a result.

State Highway 4 was renamed Snowy Mountains Highway on 19 July 1955; the section of State Highway 4 between Nimmitabel and Cooma was also re-designated part of State Highway 19 at the same time. State Highway 19 was officially named Monaro Highway three years later, on 18 June 1958. In contrast with Snowy Mountains Highway, the entire length of State Highway 19 was within the Monaro region. During the mid to late 1960s the highway south of Nimmitabel was rerouted along a newly constructed roadway; the former alignment is now known as Old Bombala Road. Snowy Mountains Highway was also realigned in this area as part of these works and connected to Monaro Highway along the new alignment. The alignment of the highway's southern end to the state border with Victoria was later changed, travelling via Rockton to connect to Cann River Highway, instead of via Delegate to connect to Bonang Highway, on 12 October 1977; the former alignment was proclaimed Trunk Road 93 and is now known as Delegate Road.

The passing of the Roads Act of 1993 through the Parliament of New South Wales updated road classifications and the way they could be declared within New South Wales. Under this act, Monaro Highway today retains its declaration as Highway 19, from the state border with Victoria via Bombala, Nimmitabel, Cooma and Michelago to the state border with the Australian Capital Territory.

==== Australian Capital Territory ====
In 1958 Federal government agreed rename the Cooma-Canberra Road within the ACT as Monaro Highway: this gave the roadway a single name between Canberra and the Victorian border. Originally, the highway ended where it met Jerrabomberra Avenue. Plans were publicised during the mid-1980s for an upgrade of the existing Monaro Highway to dual-carriageway standard between Isabella Drive and Jerrabomberra Avenue, and an extension of the roadway to the north. These works were known as the Eastern Parkway. These plans were then given the go ahead in a report tabled on 5 May 1987, the estimated costs were $50 million including upgrades to other nearby roadways. Around the same time period a large service centre was proposed for near the Isabella Drive intersection, though it was quite controversial, and the developer pulled out. Between 1988 and November 1989 the duplication was completed, and the roadway extended as far as Canberra Avenue. After this the road was extended to its current terminus at Morshead Drive, although the northbound carriageway was originally routed over Dairy Flat Road until a southbound carriageway was constructed later on. Further duplication was performed to other sections of the extension until all sections were completed in mid-2012. The northern end of Monaro Highway now connects to the southern end of Majura Parkway following the latter's completion in 2016. Territory and Municipal Services has classified Monaro Highway as an arterial road within the ACT Road Hierarchy.

Currently, upgrades are underway to the highway near Hume, providing new grade separated interchanged at Lanyon Drive and Isabella Drive, as well as left-in, left-out intersections with Mugga Lane, Tralee Street with an overpass between these intersections. The upgrades will complete a 25 km long motorway-standard road all along eastern edge of Canberra.

=== Route markers ===
Former National Route 23 route marker (left), and former Alternate National Route 23 route marker (right). [Not to scale]
Current B23 route marker used in NSW/Victoria (top), and A23 marker used in ACT (bottom). [Not to scale]

Route markers were first introduced in Australia in late 1954. Over the following decades they were progressively rolled out to the various highways around the nation, under a nationwide route numbering scheme. The highway was originally designated National Route 23 in 1962 between Canberra and Cooma, extended further to Nimmitabel in 1967. Although after the construction of the Eastern Parkway extension, the highway north of Canberra Avenue was designated Alternate National Route 23. The section of Monaro Highway between Steeple Flat and Cooma was also designated National Route 18 in addition to National Route 23, in an arrangement known as a duplex or concurrency, allowing one route to cover Snowy Mountains Highway from end to end (with Monaro Highway linking its two sections).

With all three states' conversion to their newer alphanumeric systems between the late 1990s to the early 2010s, its former route number was updated to route B23 for the highway within Victoria (in 1997), to route B23 within New South Wales section (in 2013), and route A23 within the Australian Capital Territory (also in 2013). This violates the convention in New South Wales, where numbered routes below 50 are prefixed with an 'A' and 'B' routes are numbered above 50; the violation was allowed so the number and letter would be consistent across state lines. The concurrency along Monaro Highway remains intact, with B72 used in addition to B23 between Steeple Flat and Cooma, linking the two sections of Snowy Mountains Highway. In the ACT, Monaro Highway is designated route A23 from the NSW border to Canberra Avenue, and as route M23 north of Canberra Avenue to its terminus, where it joins Majura Parkway.

== Junctions ==
State/Territory	LGA/District	Location	km	mi	Destinations	Notes
Victoria	East Gippsland	Cann River	0.0	0.0	Princes Highway (A1) – Eden, Orbost, Melbourne	Southern terminus of Monaro Highway and route B23
State border			43.9	27.3	Victoria – New South Wales state border	
New South Wales	Genoa River		57.0	35.4	Bridge over the river	
New South Wales	Snowy Monaro	Bombala	83.7	52.0	Delegate Road (MR93) – Delegate	T-intersection
New South Wales	Snowy Monaro	Bombala	86.0	53.4	Maybe Street, to Cathcart Road (MR91 east) – Cathcart; Forbes Street (south) – Bombala	Four-way intersection
New South Wales	Bombala River		86.2	53.6	Bridge over river	
New South Wales	Snowy Monaro	Bombala	86.3	53.6	Mahratta Street (west) – Bombala	T-intersection
New South Wales	Bombala River		88.4	54.9	Bridge over river	
New South Wales	Snowy Monaro	Bibbenluke	98.6	61.3	Black Lake Road (MR563) – Bibbenluke, Cathcart, Pambula	
New South Wales	Bombala River		99.0	61.5	Bridge over river	
New South Wales	Snowy Monaro	Ando	106.3	66.1	The Snowy River Way (MR394) – Dalgety, Berridale, Jindabyne	
New South Wales	Snowy Monaro	Steeple Flat	125.0	77.7	Old Bombala Road	Former Monaro Highway alignment
New South Wales	Snowy Monaro	Steeple Flat	127.2	79.0	Snowy Mountains Highway (HW4, B72 east) – Bega	Southern terminus of concurrency with route B72 at T-intersection
New South Wales	Snowy Monaro	Nimmitabel	135.2	84.0	Old Bombala Road	Former Monaro Highway alignment
New South Wales	Snowy Monaro	Nimmitabel	137.1	85.2	Clarke Street, to Old Bega Road – Bemboka	Former Snowy Mountains Highway alignment
New South Wales	Snowy Monaro	Cooma	172.3	107.1	Polo Flat Road (RR7624) – Polo Flat Airport	
New South Wales	Snowy Monaro	Cooma	173.5	107.8	Sharp Street (HW4, B72 west) – Tumut, Jindabyne; Bombala Street (north) – Cooma	Northern terminus of concurrency with route B72 at four-way roundabout
New South Wales	Snowy Monaro	Cooma	174.7	108.6	Yareen Road, to Numeralla Road (RR7625) – Braidwood	
New South Wales	Snowy Monaro	Cooma	177.3	110.2	Polo Flat Road (RR7624) – Polo Flat Airport	
New South Wales	Numeralla River		191.6	119.1	Bridge over river	
New South Wales	Bredbo River		206.1	128.1	Bridge over river	
New South Wales	Snowy Monaro	Williamsdale	248.0	154.1	Monaro Highway	Northern terminus of route B23
State border			248.0	154.1	New South Wales – Australian Capital Territory state border	
Australian Capital Territory	Tuggeranong	Williamsdale	248.0	154.1	Monaro Highway	Southern terminus of route A23
Australian Capital Territory	Tuggeranong	Theodore–Calwell–Richardson tripoint	268.1	166.6	Tharwa Drive (southwest) – Tharwa; Johnson Drive (west) – Tuggeranong Town Centre, Calwell	Roundabout with southbound bypass lane
Australian Capital Territory	Tuggeranong	Gilmore	273.4	169.9	Isabella Drive – Tuggeranong	Roundabout with southbound bypass lanes
Australian Capital Territory	Jerrabomberra	Hume	275.5	171.2	Lanyon Drive – Hume, Jerrabomberra, Queanbeyan	
Australian Capital Territory	Jerrabomberra–Canberra Central boundary	Symonston–Narrabundah boundary	280.4	174.2	Hindmarsh Drive (B52 east, unallocated west) – Queanbeyan, Symonston, Woden	Diamond interchange
Australian Capital Territory	Jerrabomberra–Canberra Central boundary	Symonston–Narrabundah–Fyshwick tripoint	281.6	175.0	Canberra Avenue (A23 west, unallocated east) – Fyshwick, South Canberra, City	Half-diamond interchange: northbound exit, southbound entry only Route A23 continues west along Canberra Avenue, southern terminus of route M23 north
Australian Capital Territory	Canberra Central	Fyshwick	282.6	175.6	Dairy Road (west) – Jerrabomberra Wetlands; Newcastle Street (east) – Fyshwick	Diamond interchange
Australian Capital Territory	Canberra Central	Fyshwick	283.9	176.4	Canberra railway line	
Australian Capital Territory	Molonglo River		284.9	177.0	Malcolm Fraser bridge	
Australian Capital Territory	Canberra Central–Majura boundary	Fyshwick–Campbell–Pialligo tripoint	285.1	177.2	Morshead Drive (west) – North Canberra, City; Pialligo Avenue (east) – Queanbeyan, Canberra Airport	
Australian Capital Territory	Canberra Central–Majura boundary	Fyshwick–Campbell–Pialligo tripoint	285.1	177.2	Majura Parkway – Majura	Northern terminus of Monaro Highway, route M23 continues north along Majura Parkway
Concurrency terminus; Incomplete access; Route transition; Listing includes: Terminuses, declared roads, former alignments, grade separated interchanges, and intersections where a turn is required to remain on the highway

== See also ==
- Highways in Australia
- Highways in New South Wales
- List of highways in Victoria
- Road infrastructure in Canberra
