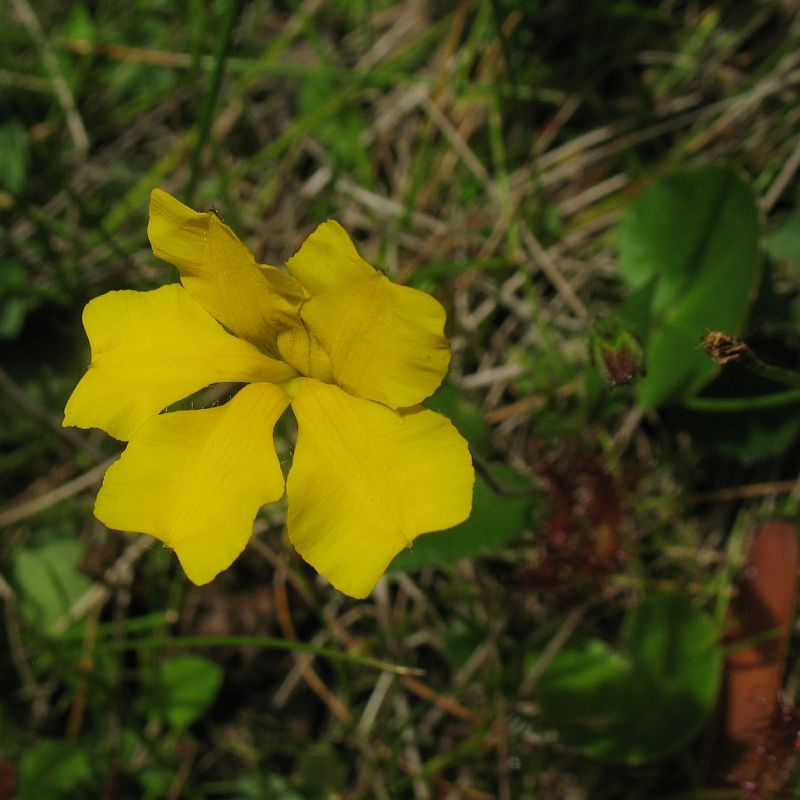
- In Nungatta National Park

Scientific classification
- Kingdom: Plantae
- Clade: Tracheophytes
- Clade: Angiosperms
- Clade: Eudicots
- Clade: Asterids
- Order: Asterales
- Family: Goodeniaceae
- Genus: Goodenia
- Species: G. elongata

Binomial name
- Goodenia elongata Labill.

= Goodenia elongata =

Lanky goodenia

Species of plant

Goodenia elongata, commonly known as lanky goodenia, is a species of flowering plant in the family Goodeniaceae and is endemic to south-eastern Australia. It is an erect or ascending herb with lance-shaped stem leaves, and yellow flowers arranged singly or in racemes.

== Description ==
Goodenia elongata is an erect or ascending herb that typically grows to a height of 40 cm (16 in) with more or less glabrous foliage. The leaves are lance-shaped with the narrower end towards the base, 50–90 mm (2.0–3.5 in) long 4–20 mm (0.16–0.79 in) wide, sometimes with teeth on the edges, and arranged on the stems. The flowers are arranged in singly or in racemes up to 100 mm (3.9 in) long with leaf-like bracts. The sepals are lance-shaped, 3.5–4 mm (0.14–0.16 in) long, the corolla yellow, 12–20 mm (0.47–0.79 in) long. The lower lobes of the corolla are 4–6.5 mm (0.16–0.26 in) long with wings 1.5–2 mm (0.059–0.079 in) wide. Flowering occurs from October to February and the fruit is an oval capsule 8–9 mm (0.31–0.35 in) long.

== Taxonomy and naming ==
Goodenia elongata was first formally described in 1805 by Jacques Labillardière in Novae Hollandiae Plantarum Specimen.

== Distribution and habitat ==
This goodenia grows in forest, usually in wet places and is found in New South Wales south from Holbrook, in the eastern half of Victoria and in many lowland areas of Tasmania. There are a few records from eastern Victoria.
