= Bombala Shire =

Former local government area in New South Wales, Australia

- Local government area
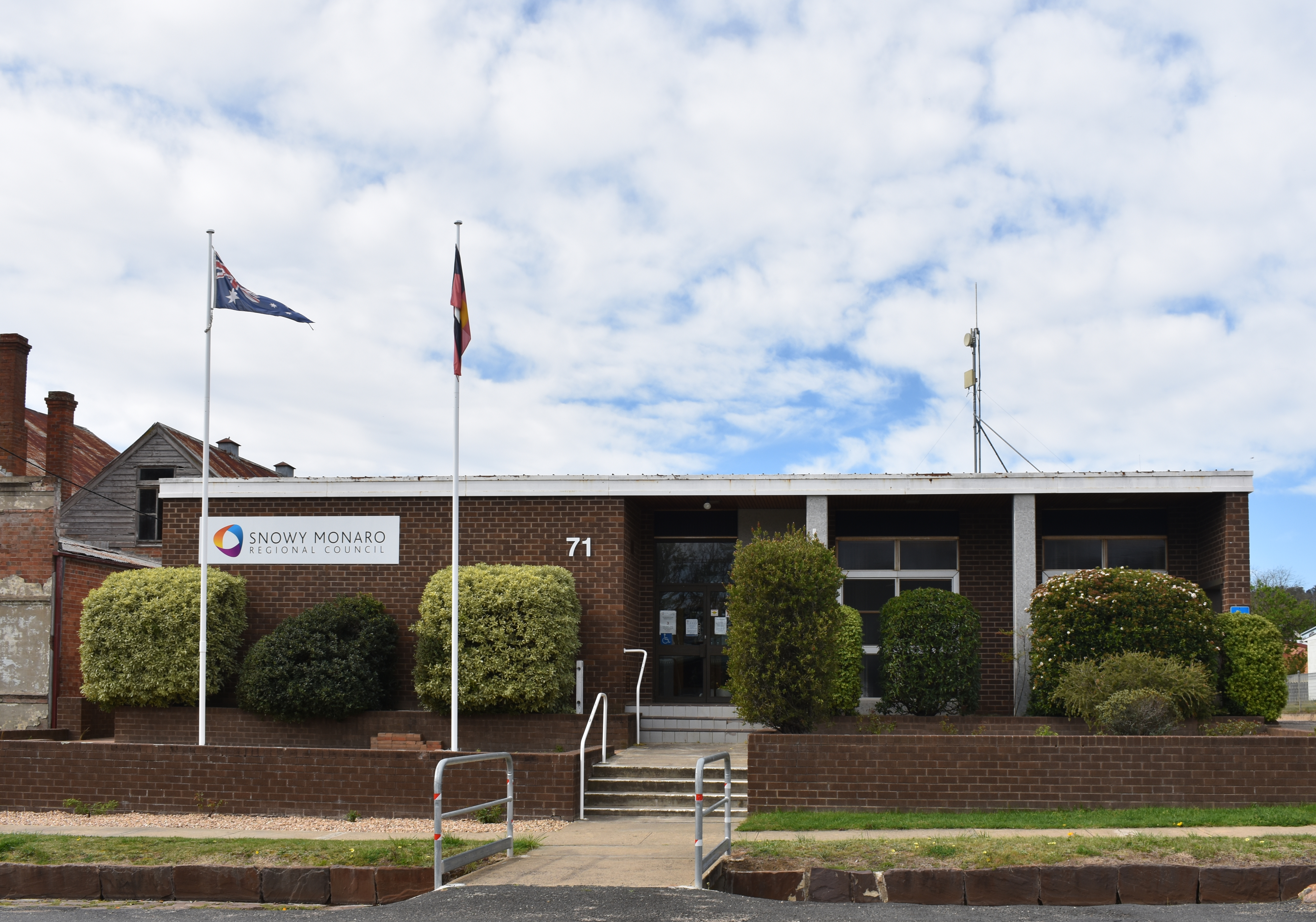
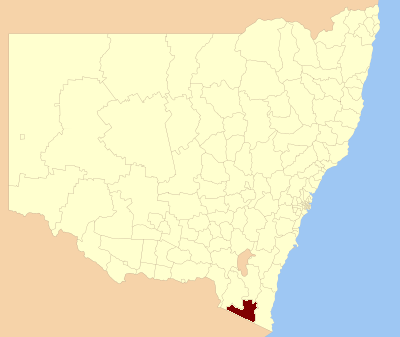
- The former Bombala Shire council chambers, 2020 Location in New South Wales
- Coordinates: 36°55′S 149°14′E
- Country: Australia
- State: New South Wales
- Region: Monaro
- Established: 1 October 1977
- Abolished: 12 May 2016
- Council seat: Bombala

Government
  - Mayor: Bob Stewart
  - State electorate: Monaro
  - Federal division: Eden-Monaro

Area
  - Total: 3,945 km^{2} (1,523 sq mi)

Population
  - Total: 2,401 (2013 est)
  - Density: 0.60862/km^{2} (1.5763/sq mi)
- Website: Bombala Shire
LGAs around Bombala Shire
| Snowy Monaro Region | Snowy Monaro Region | Bega Valley |
| East Gippsland (Vic) | Bombala Shire | Bega Valley |
| East Gippsland (Vic) | East Gippsland (Vic) | Bega Valley |

The Bombala Shire was a local government area in the Monaro region of south-eastern New South Wales, Australia. The Shire includes the town of Bombala, the villages of Delegate, Cathcart, Bibbenluke and the localities of Ando, Bungarby, Craigie, Mila, Rockton and Creewah. Bombala Shire was formed on 1 October 1977 by the amalgamation of the Municipality of Bombala and Bibbenluke Shire.

Prior to its abolition, Bombala was the fifth smallest rural shire in New South Wales, by area.

A 2015 review of local government boundaries recommended that the Bombala Shire merge with the Cooma-Monaro and Snowy River shires to form a new council with an area of 15,162 square kilometres (5,854 sq mi) and support a population of approximately 21,000. On 12 May 2016, the Bombala Shire merged with the Cooma-Monaro and the Snowy River shires to form the Snowy Monaro Regional Council.

The last mayor of Bombala Shire Council was Bob Stewart, an unaligned politician.

== Council ==
=== Current composition and election method ===
Prior to its dissolution, the Bombala Council was composed of seven councillors elected proportionally as one entire ward. All councillors were elected for a fixed four-year term of office. The mayor was elected by the councillors at the first meeting of the council. The most recent election was held on 8 September 2012, and the last makeup of the council was as follows:

| Party | Councillors |
|---|---|
| Independents and Unaligned | 7 |
| Total | 7 |

The last Council, elected in 2012 and dissolved in 2016, in order of election, was:

| Councillor | Party | Notes |
|---|---|---|
| Bob Stewart | Unaligned | Mayor |
| Bill Bateman | Independent | |
| Suzanne Haslingden | Unaligned | |
| Brad Yelds | Independent | |
| Steve Goodyer | Unaligned | |
| Diane Hampshire | Unaligned | |
| Joseph Ingram | Unaligned | Deputy Mayor |
