= Basket Lake =

Lake in the state of Florida, United States

- Location within Florida Location within the United States
- Location: near Sebring, Highlands County, Florida
- Coordinates: 27°31′43.6″N 81°26′36.6″W
- Surface area: 61.6 acres (249,000 m^{2})
- Surface elevation: 95 feet (29 m)

Basket Lake is a natural freshwater lake in Highlands County, Florida. Located just north of Sebring, Florida, and Dinner Lake, Basket Lake has a surface area of 61.6 acres (249,000 m^{2}). This lake is shaped like a peanut and is surrounded by citrus groves, which in turn are surrounded by Basket Lake Road.

There is no public access to Basket Lake, as it is completely surrounded by private land. Therefore, no boating, swimming or fishing can be done without permission. Two websites, however, have comments saying the fishing is good for various types of fish, including bass, shellcracker, crappie and perch.
