= Cann River, Victoria =

Cann River
- Town
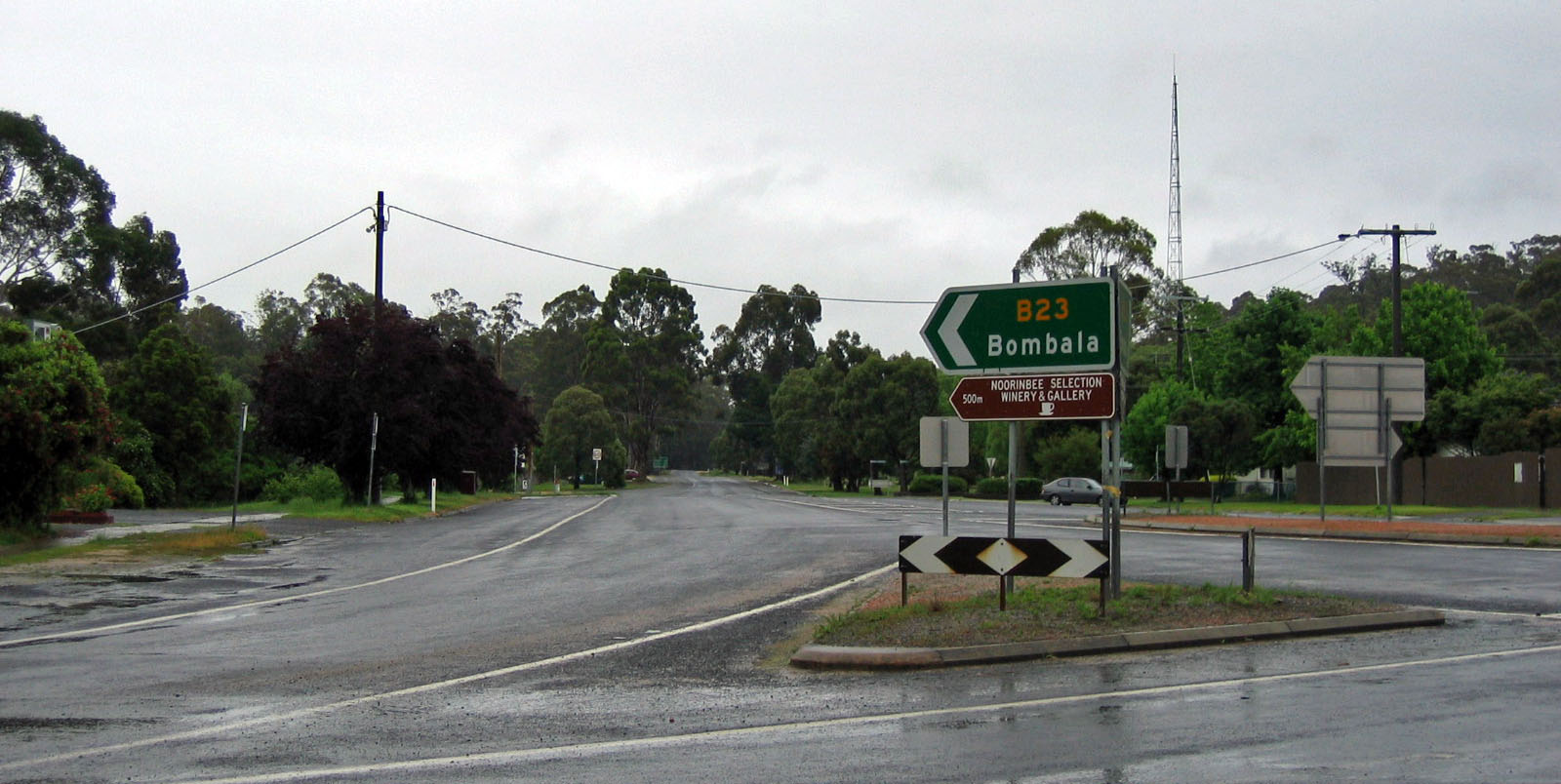
- The junction of the Monaro Highway with the Princes Highway

- Interactive map of Cann River
- Coordinates: 37°33′58″S 149°09′04″E
- Country: Australia
- State: Victoria
- LGA: Shire of East Gippsland
- Location: 461 km (286 mi) E of Melbourne; 88 km (55 mi) E of Orbost; 96 km (60 mi) S of Bombala; 298 km (185 mi) S of Canberra; 114 km (71 mi) SE of Eden

Government
  - State electorate: Gippsland East
  - Federal division: Gippsland
- Elevation: 97 m (318 ft)

Population
  - Total: 197 (2021 census)
- Postcode: 3890

Cann River is a town in the East Gippsland region of Victoria, Australia. The town is located on the Cann River at the junction of the Princes Highway and the Monaro Highway, in the Shire of East Gippsland. At the 2021 census, Cann River had a population of 197 people.

== Features ==
The town is close to the Lind, Coopracambra, Croajingolong, and Alfred national parks, and is a popular stopping point for travellers between Melbourne and Sydney using the Princes Highway route. Public transport services are provided to the town by V/Line, a daily coach service between Batemans Bay/Narooma and Bairnsdale.

The post office opened on 1 July 1890.

== Population ==
In the 2021 Census, there were 197 people in Cann River. 74.6% of people were born in Australia and 87.3% of people spoke only English at home.

== Gallery ==
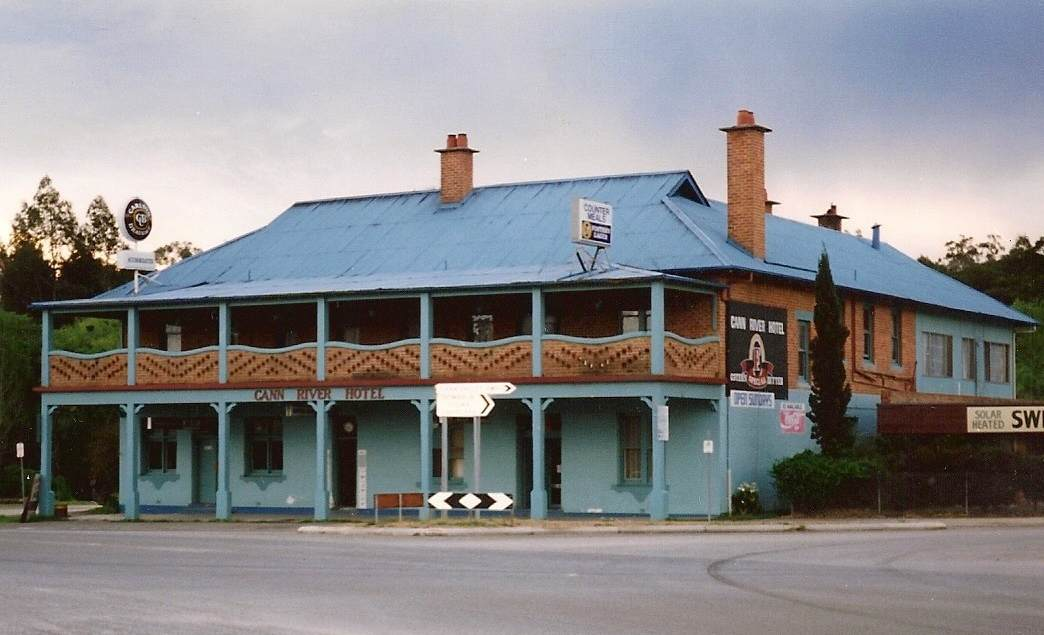
Cann River Hotel

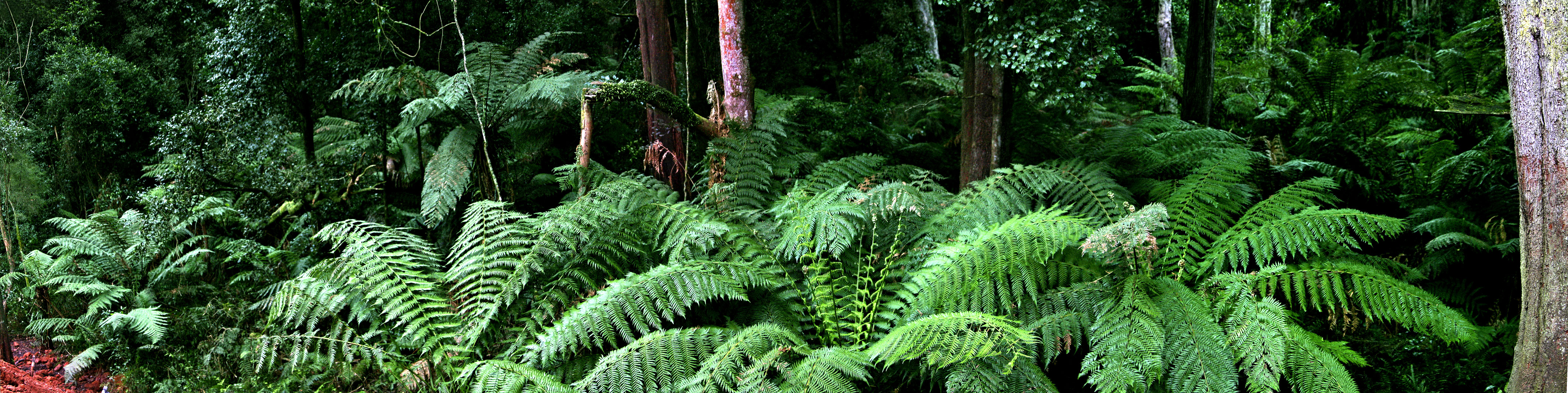
Ferns, near Cann River

== See also ==
- Cann River East Branch
