= Meera Sodha =

British cook (born 1982)

- Born: Meera Vrajlal Sodha; January 1982 (age 44); Scunthorpe, England
- Education: London School of Economics
- Years active: 2015–present
- Spouse: Hugh de Winton
- Children: 2
- Website: meerasodha.com

Meera Vrajlal Sodha (born January 1982) is an English columnist and cookbook author. Her second cookbook Fresh India (2016) won the Observer Food Monthly Award for Best New Cookbook, while her vegan column in The Guardian won a Fortnum & Mason Food and Drink Award.

== Early life ==
Sodha was born in Scunthorpe to Ugandan Indian parents of Gujarati heritage and grew up in a farming village in rural Lincolnshire. Sodha attended Hymers College in Hull. She graduated from the London School of Economics in 2003 with a Bachelor of Science (BSc) in Industrial Relations.

== Career ==
=== Cookbooks ===
Sodha's debut cookbook Made in India, Cooked in Britain: Recipes from an Indian Family Kitchen (published in 2014) was shortlisted for the André Simon Food & Drink Book Award.

Fresh India: 130 Quick, Easy and Delicious Vegetarian Recipes for Every Day, her second cookbook and first vegetarian work, was published in 2016. It won the Observer Food Monthly (OFM) Award for Best New Cookbook, and was shortlisted for the André Simon Food & Drink Book Award.

Her third cookbook, East: 120 Vegan and Vegetarian Recipes from Beijing to Bangalore (published in 2019) became a Bookstat e-book bestseller.

Her fourth cookbook, Dinner: 120 Vegan and Vegetarian Recipes for the Most Important Meal of the Day (published in 2024) was shortlisted for the André Simon Food & Drink Book Award.

=== Column ===
In 2017, Sodha started writing a column in The Guardian titled The New Vegan. Sodha won Best Cookery Writer at the 2018 Fortnum & Mason Food and Drink Awards for the column. It was nominated for a second time in 2021 in the same category.

== Personal life ==
In 2016, Sodha married Hugh de Winton at Kew Gardens. The couple live in Walthamstow, East London and have two daughters. In 2025, Sodha opened up about her experiences with depression and burnout.

== Bibliography ==
- Made in India, Cooked in Britain: Recipes from an Indian Family Kitchen (2014)
- Fresh India: 130 Quick, Easy and Delicious Vegetarian Recipes for Every Day (2017)
- East: 120 Vegan and Vegetarian Recipes from Beijing to Bangalore (2019)
- Dinner: 120 Vegan and Vegetarian Recipes for the Most Important Meal of the Day (2024)

== See also ==
- List of vegan and plant-based media
