= Lind National Park =

National park in Victoria, Australia

- IUCN category II (national park)
- Location within Victoria
- Location: Victoria
- Nearest city: Cann River
- Coordinates: 37°34′14″S 148°57′37″E
- Area: 13.7 km^{2} (5.3 sq mi)
- Established: 1925
- Visitors: circa 3,500 (in circa 1998)
- Governing body: Parks Victoria
- Website: Official website

The Lind National Park is a national park in the East Gippsland region of Victoria, Australia. The 1,370-hectare (3,400-acre) national park is situated approximately 419 kilometres (260 mi) east of Melbourne, adjacent to the Princes Highway between Orbost and Cann River.

== See also ==
- Protected areas of Victoria
- List of national parks of Australia
