= Dinner Time =

Dinner time, Dinnertime, and the like, may refer to:

- Dinner Time (cartoon), a 1928 animated short
- "Dinner Time", episode of Phil of the Future television series
- Dinnertime, a 1972 Alex Taylor album
- "Dinner-Time at Penshurst in 1655", a painting by Solomon Hart
- "Dinner Time", a song by Royce da 5'9" featuring Busta Rhymes from Street Hop
- Dinner Time (album), a 2007 album by Boot Camp Clik member Louieville Sluggah

== See also ==
- Dinner
- Supper-time (disambiguation)
