= Supper-time =

Supper-time may refer to:

- Supper, the meal concept
- "Supper Time", the 1933 song by Irving Berlin
- "Suppertime" (or "Supper-Time"), a song written by Ira Stanphill and released in 1953 by Jimmie Davis with Anita Kerr Singers.
- Suppertime, an unreleased album by rapper Static Major
- Suppertime, an Australian food delivery service acquired by Delivery Hero and rebranded Foodora
