= Dinner (book) =

2024 book

- Author: Meera Sodha
- Genre: Cookbook
- Publisher: Fig Tree (Penguin Books imprint), Flatiron Books (adapted for the US)
- Publication date: 2024-08-01
- Publication place: London
- Pages: 320
- ISBN: 978-0-241-48800-3

Dinner: 120 Vegan and Vegetarian Recipes for the Most Important Meal of the Day is a 2024 cookbook by Meera Sodha published by Fig Tree, an imprint of Penguin Books.

== Background ==
In addition to containing vegan and vegetarian recipes, the book also includes stories and essays. It deals with cooking and Sodha's experiences of going through a creative drought.

== Reception ==
Dinner received positive reviews from critics. Bee Wilson of The Guardian named it one of the five best cookbooks of 2024, describing it as "a joyous rundown of mostly one-pot or one-tray dinners, many of them Asian." It was shortlisted for the André Simon Food & Drink Book Award.
