= Bibbenluke Shire =

Former local government area in New South Wales, Australia

Bibbenluke Shire New South Wales
- Established: 7 March 1906
- Abolished: 1 October 1977
- Council seat: Bombala
- Region: Monaro

Bibbenluke Shire was a local government area in the Monaro region of New South Wales, Australia.

Bibbenluke Shire was proclaimed on 7 March 1906. The shire offices were based in Bombala.

The shire was amalgamated with the Municipality of Bombala to form Bombala Shire on 1 October 1977.
