= The Dinner =

The Dinner may refer to:

- The Dinner (1997 film), a 1997 American film directed by Bernie Casey
- The Dinner or La cena, a 1998 Italian film directed by Ettore Scola
- The Dinner (novel), a 2009 Dutch novel by Herman Koch (original title: Het diner)
- The Dinner (2013 film), a 2013 Dutch film based on the novel by Herman Koch
- The Dinner (2014 film), a 2014 Italian film
- The Dinner (2017 film), a 2017 American film
- "The Dinner" (Amphibia), an episode of Amphibia
