= Dinner Lake =

Lake in the state of Florida, United States

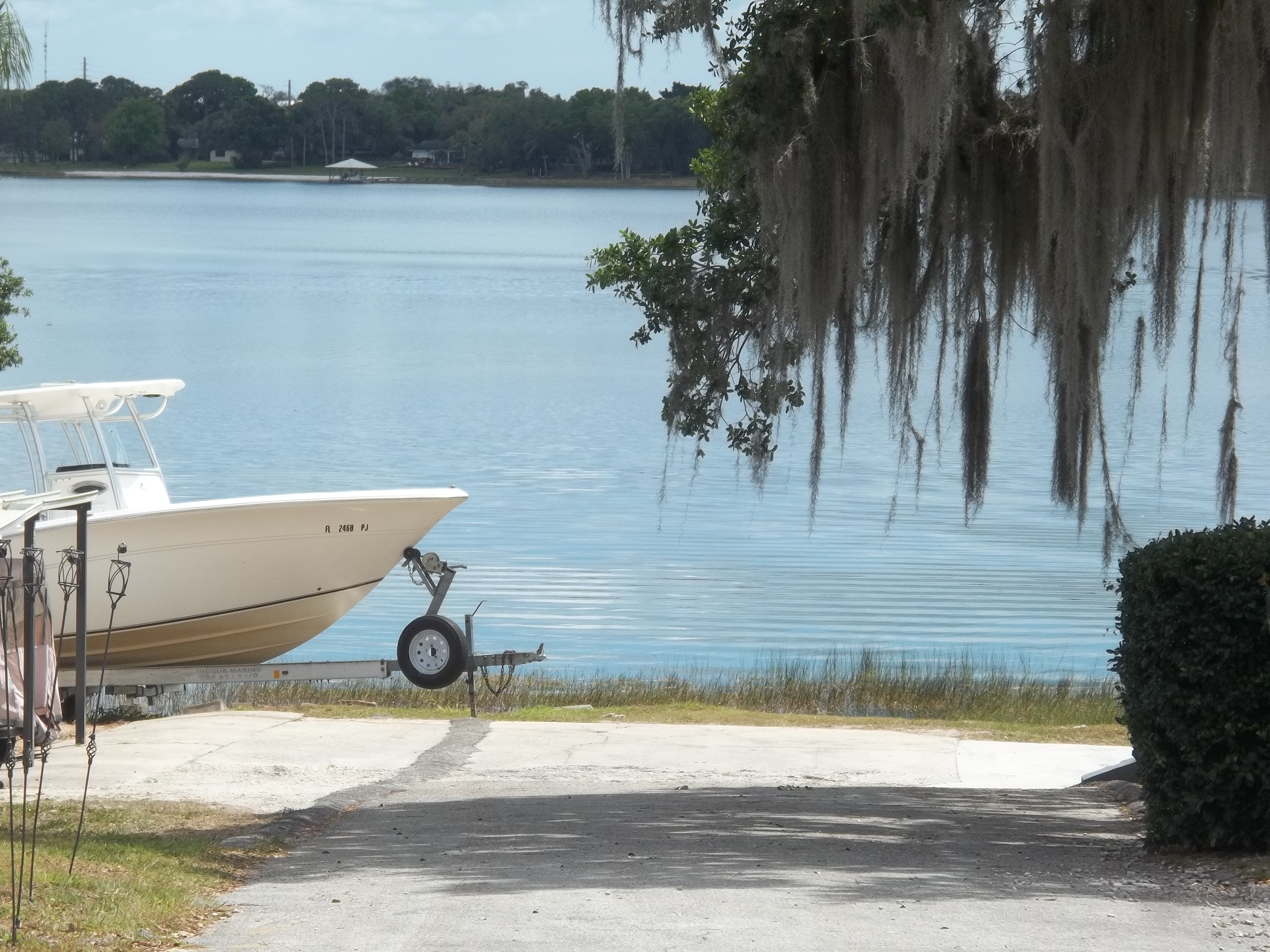

- Location within Florida
- Location: Sebring, Florida
- Coordinates: 27°30′59″N 81°26′35″W
- Basin countries: United States
- Surface area: 420 acres (1.7 km^{2})
- Average depth: 10 ft (3.0 m)
- Max. depth: 22 ft (6.7 m)

Dinner Lake is a 420-acre (2 km^{2}) lake located in Sebring, Florida. The lake averages about 20 feet (6 m) in depth, and the deepest point is approximately 34 feet (10 m). The lake is part of the Eastern Complex of the Central Ridge subdivision of the Lake Wales division of the Central Lake District (of Florida).

Dinner Lake has one boat ramp, located on the north shore of the lake.

== See also ==
- Basket Lake
