= Dinner Creek =

Creek in Minnesota

Coordinates: 48°5′2.5″N 93°57′57.5″W

Dinner Creek is a stream in Koochiching County, in the U.S. state of Minnesota.

Dinner Creek was named from the fact lumbermen often gathered there for dinner.

== See also ==
- List of rivers of Minnesota
