= Coopracambra National Park =

- IUCN category II (national park)
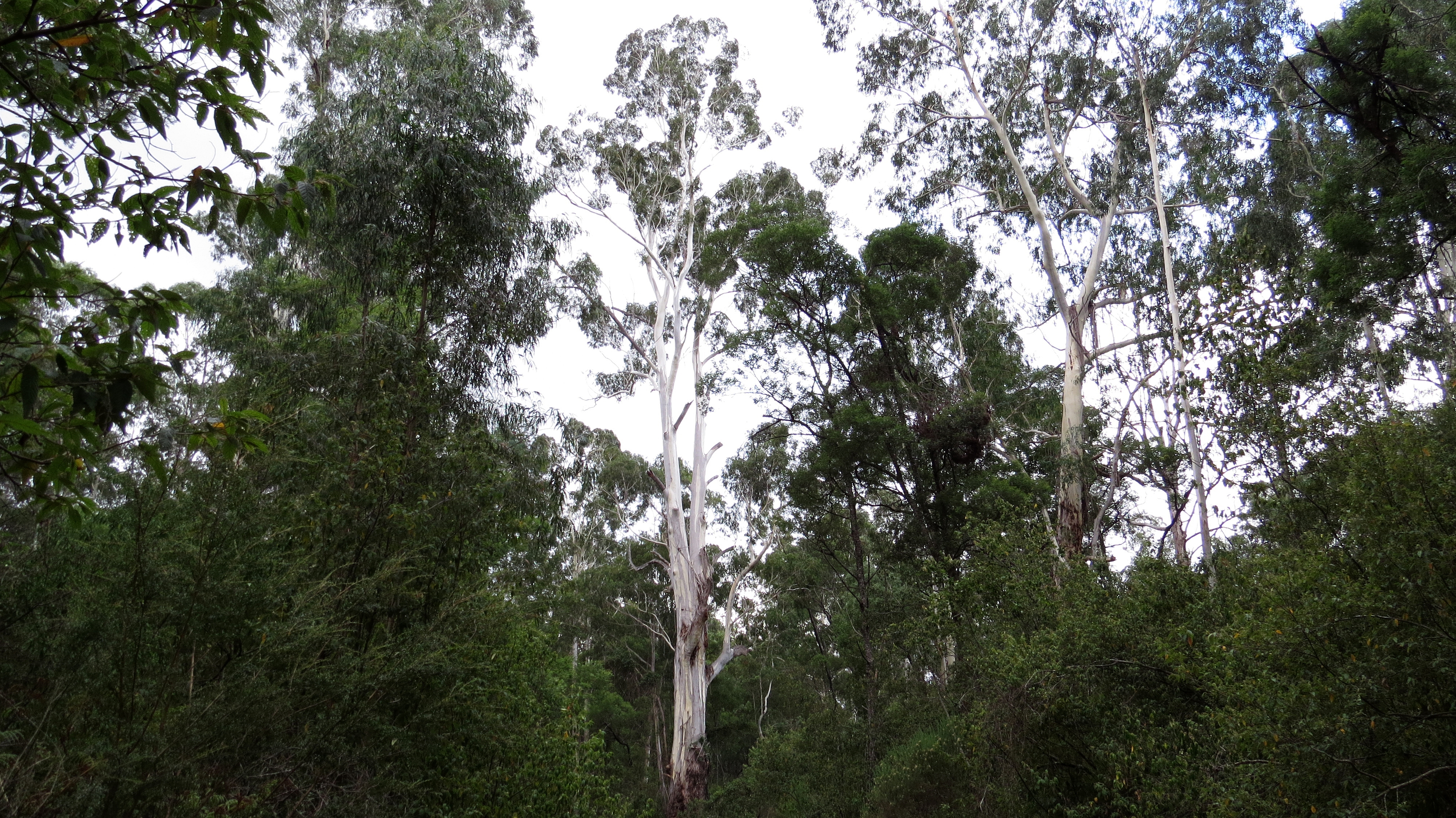
- Eucalypts in the national park

- Location within Victoria
- Location: Victoria
- Nearest city: Cann River
- Coordinates: 37°18′41″S 149°13′13″E
- Area: 388 km^{2} (150 sq mi)
- Established: 1988
- Governing body: Parks Victoria
- Website: http://parkweb.vic.gov.au/explore/parks/coopracambra-national-park

The Coopracambra National Park is a national park located in the Gippsland region of Victoria, Australia. The 38,800-hectare (96,000-acre) national park is situated approximately 460 kilometres (290 mi) east of Melbourne and 250 kilometres (160 mi) south of Canberra, near the town of Cann River.

== Features ==
The northern boundary of the park is defined by the Black-Allan Line that marks part of the border between Victoria and New South Wales. The Monaro Highway defines the park's western boundary. Within the confines of the park, the Genoa River flows eastwards to the Tasman Sea. The highest peaks in the park are Mount Coopracambra, with an elevation of 1,103 metres (3,619 ft) above sea level; Mount Kaye, with an elevation of 998–1,000 metres (3,274–3,281 ft), and Mount Denmarsh, with an elevation of 917 metres (3,009 ft).

Combined with the adjoining South East Forests National Park located in New South Wales, the Coopracambra National Park forms one of the largest contiguous areas of high quality wilderness in south-eastern Australia that spans from Bombala in New South Wales to the town of Cann River in Victoria.

== See also ==
- Protected areas of Victoria
