= Cathcart, New South Wales =

Cathcart New South Wales
- Coordinates: 36°50′35″S 149°23′17″E
- Population: 108 (2016 census)
- Established: 1857
- Postcode(s): 2632
- Location: 485 km (301 mi) SSW of Sydney; 16 km (10 mi) NE of Bombala
- LGA(s): Snowy Monaro Regional Council
- State electorate(s): Monaro
- Federal division(s): Eden-Monaro
Mean max temp	Mean min temp	Annual rainfall
17.8 °C; 64 °F	5.1 °C; 41 °F	806.5 mm 31.8 in

Cathcart is a village in the Snowy Monaro Regional Council in southern New South Wales, Australia. The village is on the Mount Darragh Road, linking the town of Bombala with the port of Eden on the Far South Coast.

== History ==
Prior to European settlement, the Ngarigo Aboriginal people were known to inhabit the lands around Cathcart. Their name for the area was Togranong.

A town was surveyed on pastoral lands known as "Taylors Flat" in 1857. The town was named for the British General George Cathcart, killed during the Crimean War. At this time, the export of wool and meat to Tasmania and trade in native animal hides were the main economic activity in the area The town would grow quickly, by virtue of its location on the route to Eden and the increased traffic associated with the discovery of gold at Kiandra becoming a significant local centre. At its peak, the town would boast three hotels, three churches, several sporting facilities, a racecourse and showgrounds, stock saleyards, a cemetery, a post office, a school and a police station. Additionally, there were several stores and two banks in the thriving town. Records show the estimated population of the district had reached 300 by 1901.

In 1865, a sawmill was established by Maurice McKinnery. The sawmill and a general store also owned by McKinnery operated until 1883, by which time economic activities had shifted towards dairy farming. Cathcart Co-Operative Dairy Society Ltd opened a butter factory in the town in 1895, closing down in January 1927 when falling butter prices rendered it unprofitable. The last dairy farm at Cathcart shifted to grazing activities in 1964.

By the 1970s, the town was in decline evidenced by the closure of the Catholic church in 1970 and the school in 1974 when just 10 students were enrolled. With modern methods of transportation reducing travel times, Cathcart's proximity to larger towns such as Bombala meant there was less need for the town to be self-sufficient. The closure of many businesses and facilities in Cathcart led to a decrease in population.

== Present Day ==
Today Cathcart is a quiet village and has close links with Bombala on which it depends for many community services. Cathcart holds an annual variety show at the War Memorial Hall which is hosted by the community. A general store remains open for business and has operated for over 100 years. In addition to essential goods, the store provides a display of the local history and is a popular stop for tourists and travellers passing through the town.

A volunteer brigade of the Monaro Rural Fire Service is maintained in Cathcart.

One of the town's original hotels, the Woolingubrah Inn, built in 1860 still stands today. The building was prefabricated in the United States of America and transported to Cathcart through the port at Eden. It is one of only two known examples of such structures in Australia.
