= South East Forests National Park =

National park in New South Wales, Australia

- IUCN category II (national park)
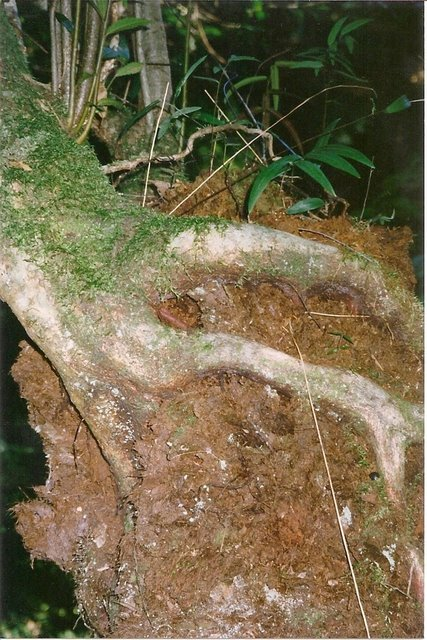
- Black olive berry on a soft tree fern at Devil's Creek, South East Forest NP

- Location within New South Wales
- Location: New South Wales
- Nearest city: Merimbula
- Coordinates: 36°59′14″S 149°28′32″E
- Area: 1,151.77 km^{2} (444.70 sq mi)
- Established: 1 January 1997
- Governing body: National Parks and Wildlife Service (New South Wales)
- Website: Official website

The South East Forests National Park is a national park located in between the Monaro and South Coast regions of New South Wales, Australia. The 115,177-hectare (284,610-acre) national park is situated 378 kilometres (235 mi) southwest of Sydney. It features high quality old growth eucalyptus forest and remnant patches of temperate rainforest.

== History ==
The park was created in 1997 by the amalgamation of Genoa, Tantawangalo, Bemboka, Yowaka and Coolangubra National Parks, all of which had been gazetted in 1994. Genoa National Park in turn was the result of the amalgamation of Nalbaugh and Nungatta National Parks, which had been established in 1972 and 1973 respectively.

Until 1968, much of the inland southeastern corner of New South Wales was rugged forest terrain known as the Wallagaraugh Wilderness, and was vacant crown land. At the time, a scientific committee appointed by the New South Wales state government recommended the area of around 100,000 hectares (250,000 acres) be protected as a national park. However, the Japanese company Harris-Daishowa sought to log the area for woodchips, and most of the land was categorised as state forest, with only Nalbaugh and Nungatta National Parks declared in what is now South East Forests National Park. Nearby, Mount Imlay and Beowa National Park were gazetted.

Logging began in October 1969, and continued for 25 years despite increasing opposition. The Unsworth Labor State government had proposed an 80,000-hectare (200,000-acre) park as a reelection promise in the 1988 state election, but was not reelected. Later, under the Fahey government, the Genoa, Tantawangalo, Bemboka Yowaka and Coolangubra national parks came into existence in 1994.

Combined with the adjoining Coopracambra National Park located in Victoria across the Black-Allan Line, the South East Forests National Park forms one of the largest contiguous areas of high quality wilderness in south-eastern Australia that spans from Bombala in New South Wales to the town of Cann River in Victoria.

== Environment ==
The region is known for its variety of eucalypt species, and wet sclerophyll (eucalypt) forests cover 42% of the park. Temperate rainforest is found in sheltered areas, and subalpine bogs at high elevations.

A great variety of animals are found within the park boundaries, including threatened species such as the smoky mouse (Pseudomys fumeus), and other species which are vulnerable in New South Wales such as the olive whistler (Pachycephala olivacea). The park forms part of the Ulladulla to Merimbula Important Bird Area, identified as such by BirdLife International because of its importance for swift parrots.

== Name ==
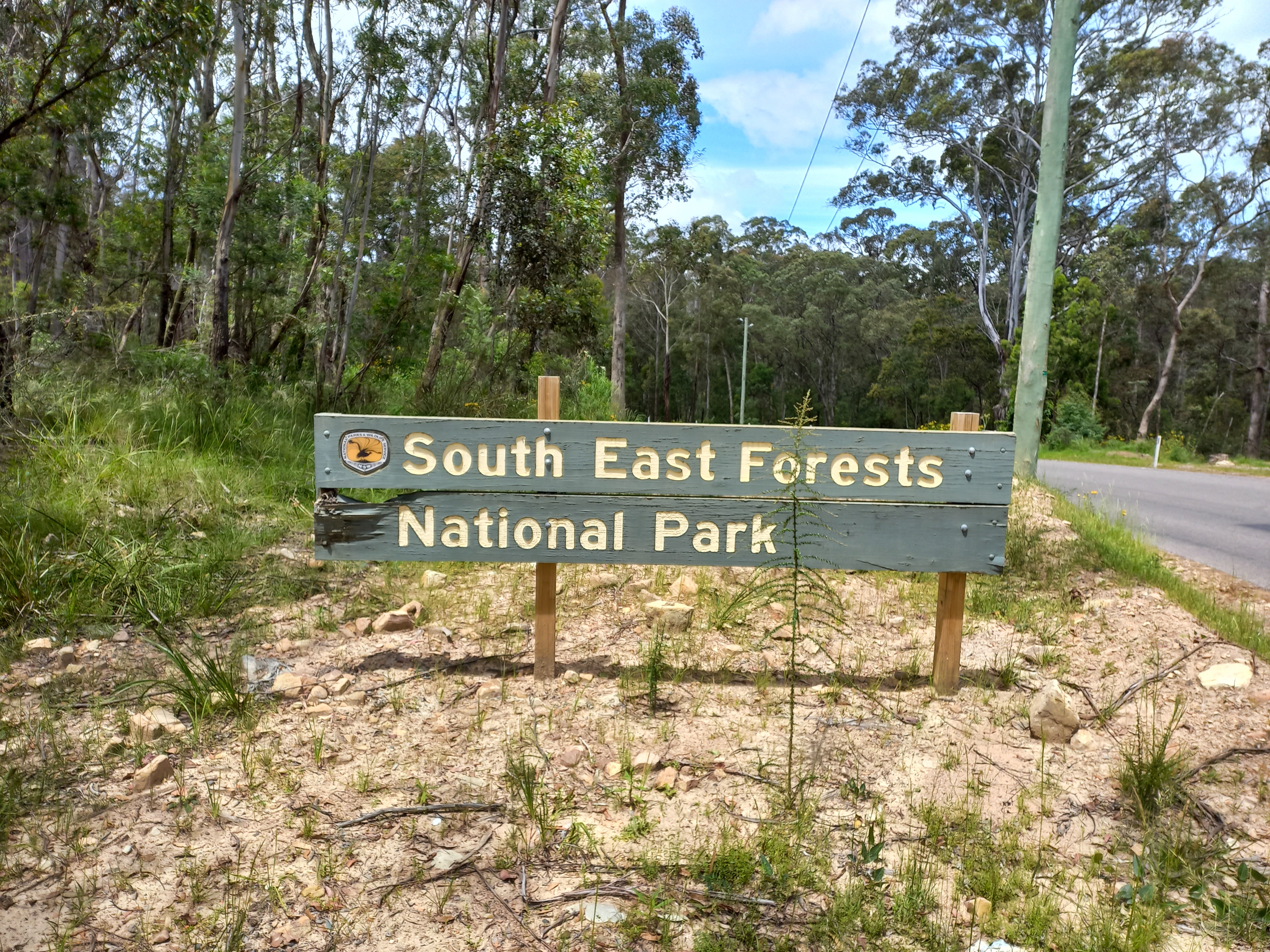
Official signage with the word "Forests".

The legal name of the park is "South East Forest National Park", as prescribed in the Act of the New South Wales Parliament establishing the park. Common usage typically pluralises "Forests", which is used in official signage for the Park.

== See also ==
- Protected areas of New South Wales
