= Kings Highway (Australia) =

Highway in the Australian Capital Territory and New South Wales

Kings Highway Australian Capital Territory–New South Wales

General information
- Type: Highway
- Length: 139 km (86 mi)
- Gazetted: August 1928 (NSW)
- Route number(s): B52 (2013–present) (Symonston–ACT/NSW border); B52 (2013–present) (NSW/ACT border–Batemans Bay)
- Former route number: National Route 52 (1974–2013); Entire route

Major junctions
- West end: Canberra Avenue; Symonston, Australian Capital Territory
- Monaro Highway; Hindmarsh Drive; Lanyon Drive; Captains Flat Road
- East end: Princes Highway; Batemans Bay, New South Wales

Location(s)
- Major settlements: Bungendore, Braidwood, Nelligen

Highway system
- Highways in Australia; National Highway • Freeways in Australia; Road infrastructure in Canberra; Highways in New South Wales

Kings Highway is an interstate highway located within the Australian Capital Territory and New South Wales, Australia. The highway connects Canberra with Batemans Bay on the South Coast. It is designated route B52.

== Route ==
West to east, it starts at the interchange with Monaro Highway, Canberra Avenue and Ipswich Street on the northern border of Symonston in the Australian Capital Territory and continues in an easterly direction along Canberra Avenue, crosses over the border into New South Wales near Queanbeyan, passes through Queanbeyan itself, Carwoola, briefly crosses back into the Kowen district of ACT and then back into NSW heading south-east to Batemans Bay via Bungendore, Braidwood and Nelligen.

Kings Highway links Monaro Highway in Canberra to Princes Highway in Batemans Bay, and provides access for residents of Canberra to the NSW South Coast and its beaches. The highway is often busy on weekends, especially during summer. The highway also experiences a high number of car crashes, on occasions averaging around one every three days, costing the local community around the highway several million dollars a year.

The landscape is generally sheep country. The highway travels from the Southern Tablelands to the South Coast via Clyde Mountain.

=== Notable features and landmarks ===
A small rock cave at "Pooh Bear's Corner" can be found near the top of the Clyde Mountain Pass. This was the location of a munitions store during the Second World War, that could be detonated to stop passage from the coast to the national capital inland.

Dozens of soft toys are placed in the eucalyptus trees along the stretch of road that connects Queanbeyan and Bungendore.

== History ==
The road through the Clyde Mountain area was surveyed by Thomas Mitchell in 1855.

A punt service across the Clyde River opened in 1895 and continued until the Nelligen Bridge opened on 12 December 1964. A replacement bridge built by Seymour Whyte opened in February 2023 with the original demolished.

The passing of the Main Roads Act of 1924 through the Parliament of New South Wales provided for the declaration of Main Roads, roads partially funded by the State government through the Main Roads Board (later Transport for NSW). Main Road No. 51 was declared along this road on 8 August 1928, from the intersection with Princes Highway at Batemans Bay, via Braidwood, Bungendore, and Queanbeyan to the border with the Federal Capital Territory (today the Australian Capital Territory); with the passing of the Main Roads (Amendment) Act of 1929 to provide for additional declarations of State Highways and Trunk Roads, this was amended to Trunk Road 51 on 8 April 1929.

The passing of the Roads Act of 1993 through the Parliament of New South Wales updated road classifications and the way they could be declared within New South Wales. Under this act, the highway today retains its declaration as Main Road 51, from the state border with Australian Capital Territory west of Queanbeyan to the intersection with Princes Highway in Batemans Bay. Despite its long-standing classification as a Main Road, and a long historical identity as Kings Highway, the road still has no officially gazetted name. Transport for NSW has come to an informal agreement with councils along the route to signpost the entire route as Kings Highway.

Kings Highway was signed National Route 52 across its entire length in 1974. With the conversion to the newer alphanumeric system in both states in 2013, this was replaced with route B52.

In 2006 construction commenced on Headquarters Joint Operations Command in the Kowen district of the ACT between Bungendore and Queanbeyan. The facility opened in December 2008, and sections of the highway between the HQJOC turnoff and Queanbeyan have progressively been upgraded to cater for the increased traffic.

== Road usage ==
In 2013 it was reported that the highway carries an average of 4,500 vehicles a day. There is an increase in traffic in the summer months. In 2003, approximately 3,000 vehicles a day were using the highway at Nelligen. From Braidwood (at the Shoalhaven River Bridge) there were about 4,200 cars travelling on the road. Out of Bungendore near Burbong, 5,600 cars were counted each day.

Casualty crash rates on the Kings Highway are 85% higher than the NSW average and road fatalities are 8% higher. A 2005 NRMA road survey found:

- The rate of people hospitalised after crashes on the Kings Highway is well over the national average. 877 crashes were recorded on Kings Highway over a 10-year period, an average of about one crash every four days. Over this time there have been 24 fatal crashes, 355 crashes resulting in injury and 488 crashes resulting in property damage. The rate was worse than this in 2004, when there were 103 crashes resulting in six fatalities and 53 injuries.
- Crashes on the Kings Highway have cost A$42.65 million over the past three years – that's equivalent to nearly A$39,000 every day.
- Safety: particular concerns over Clyde Mountain, and only 5% of road deemed to provide "safe" overtaking opportunities. Two blackspots (one in Eurobodalla and one in Palerang) and 16 blacklengths (nine in Eurobodalla, six in Palerang and one in Queanbeyan City) were identified. The 40 kilometres (25 mi) section of road over the Great Dividing Range – which includes Clyde Mountain – recorded the highest number of crashes, with 22% of all incidents occurring in this area.
- The most common type of crash – 18% of all incidents – was when a vehicle leaves the road to the left on a right hand bend and crashes into a stationary object. Head-on collisions made up one in 10 of all crashes. Crashes occurred most frequently on Sundays (20%) and least frequently on Tuesdays (9%). Recent drought conditions and an explosion in the kangaroo population in the area, has seen a marked increase in the number of crashes between vehicles and these macropods – particularly at night. This is evidenced by the increasing levels of 'road kill' carcasses on the sides of the Highway.

== Major intersections ==
State/Territory	District/LGA	Location	km	mi	Destinations	Notes
Australian Capital Territory	Canberra Central–Jerrabomberra boundary	Fyshwick–Narrabundah–Symonston boundary	0.0	0.0	Canberra Avenue (A23 northwest) – Capital Hill, Manuka	Western terminus of Kings Highway, continues northwest as Canberra Avenue
Australian Capital Territory	Canberra Central–Jerrabomberra boundary	Fyshwick–Narrabundah–Symonston boundary	0.0	0.0	Monaro Highway (A23 south) – Hume, Cooma	Southbound entrance and northbound exit only
Australian Capital Territory	Canberra Central–Jerrabomberra boundary	Fyshwick–Narrabundah–Symonston boundary	0.0	0.0	Ipswich Street (northeast) – Fyshwick, to Majura Parkway – Pialligo, Canberra Airport	
Australian Capital Territory	Canberra Central–Jerrabomberra boundary	Fyshwick–Symonston boundary	1.3	0.81	Hindmarsh Drive (B52 west) – Woden; Newcastle Street (north) – Fyshwick	Route B52 continues west along Hindmarsh Drive
Australian Capital Territory	Jerrabomberra		4.1	2.5	Norse Road – Oaks Estate	Westbound entrance and eastbound exit only
State border			4.2	2.6	Australian Capital Territory – New South Wales state border	
New South Wales	Queanbeyan	Crestwood–Queanbeyan West boundary	5.6	3.5	Lanyon Drive – Cooma	Roundabout with eastbound bypass lanes
New South Wales	Queanbeyan	Queanbeyan East	8.6	5.3	Yass Road (north) – Civic, Goulburn, Canberra Airport; Ellerton Drive (south) – Jerrabomberra	Roundabout
New South Wales	Palerang	Carwoola	11.3	7.0	Captains Flat Road – Captains Flat	Roundabout with eastbound bypass lanes
State border			16.6	10.3	New South Wales – Australian Capital Territory state border	
Australian Capital Territory	Kowen	Kowen	17.0	10.6	Charcoal Kiln Road – Kowen	
State border			24.1	15.0	Australian Capital Territory – New South Wales state border	
New South Wales	Palerang	Bungendore	32.2	20.0	Tarago Road – Tarago, Goulburn	T-intersection
New South Wales	Palerang	Manar	53.6	33.3	Braidwood Road – Tarago, Goulburn	
New South Wales	Palerang	Braidwood	79.4	49.3	Nerriga Road – Nerriga, Nowra	
New South Wales	Eurobodalla	Batemans Bay	139.0	86.4	Peninsula Drive (south) – North Batemans Bay	
New South Wales	Eurobodalla	Batemans Bay	139.0	86.4	Princes Highway (A1) – Nowra, Bega, Wollongong, Sydney	Eastern terminus of highway and route B52
1.000 mi = 1.609 km; 1.000 km = 0.621 mi: Incomplete access; Route transition

== Gallery ==
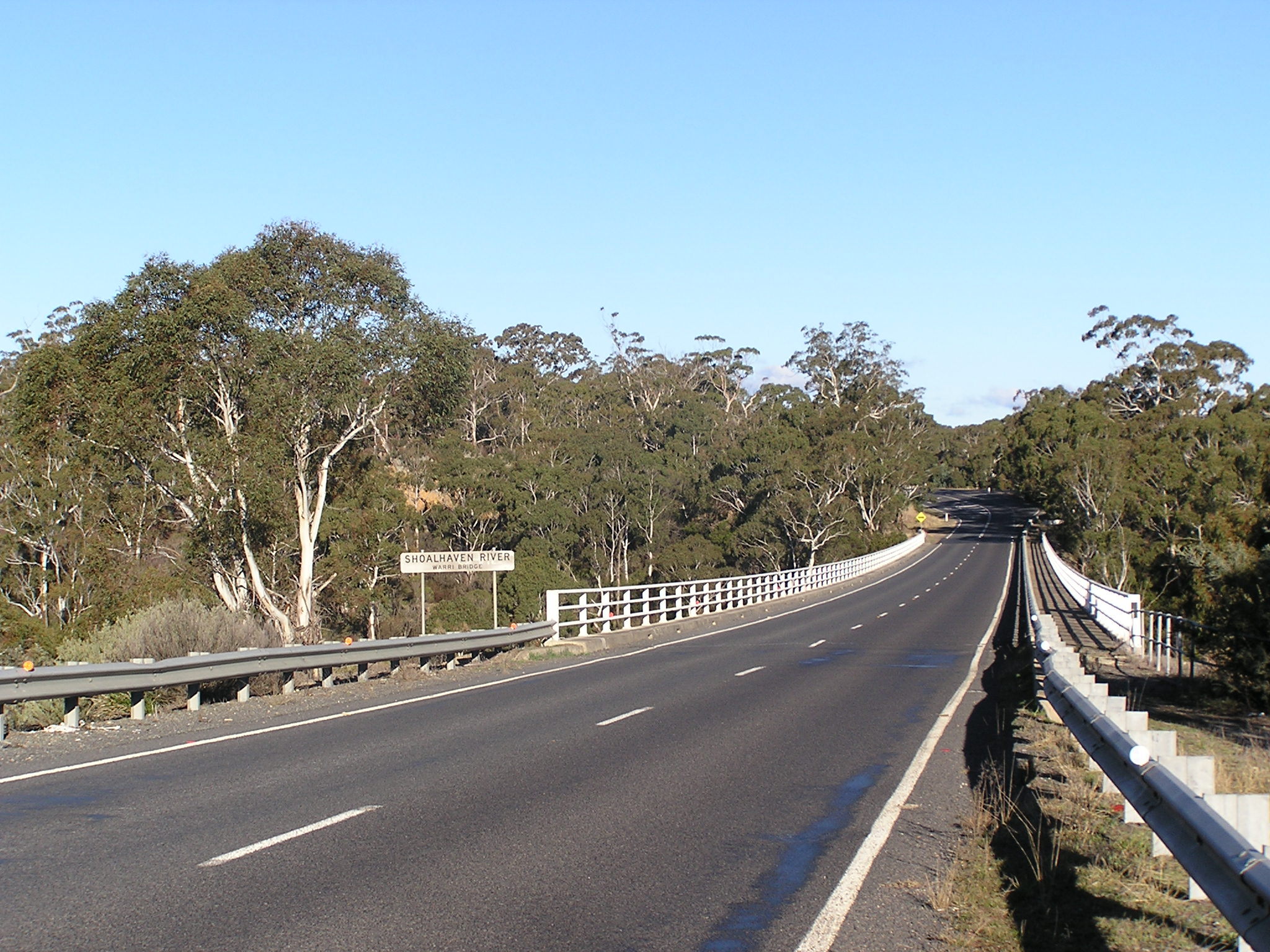
Warri Bridge, which crosses the Shoalhaven River near Braidwood.

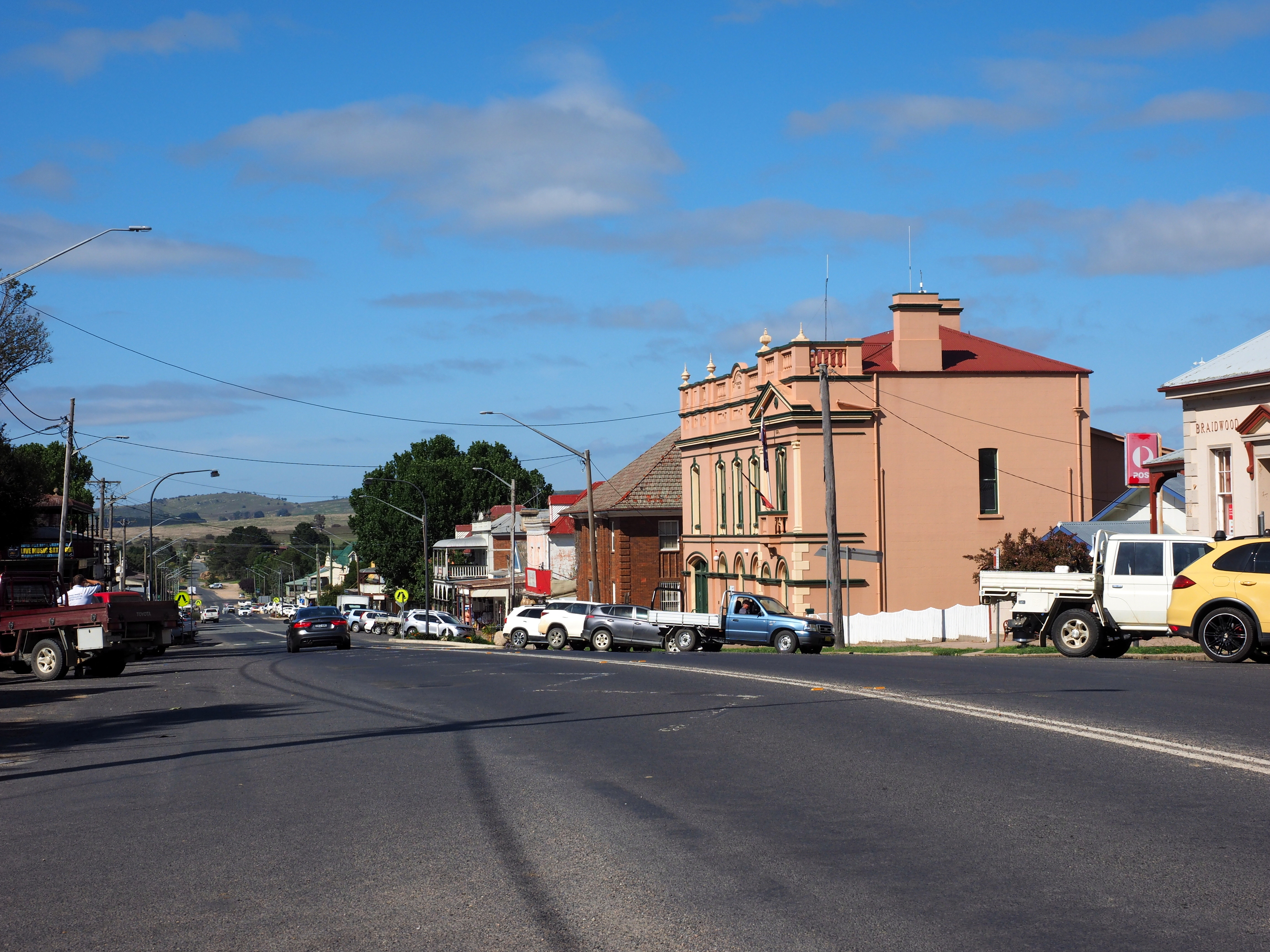
Kings Highway at Braidwood.

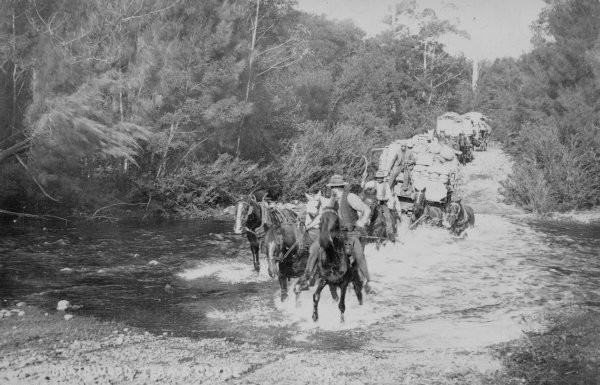
Horse teams carting goods from the ship at Nellingen to Braidwood, crossing Currajong Creek, about 1902.

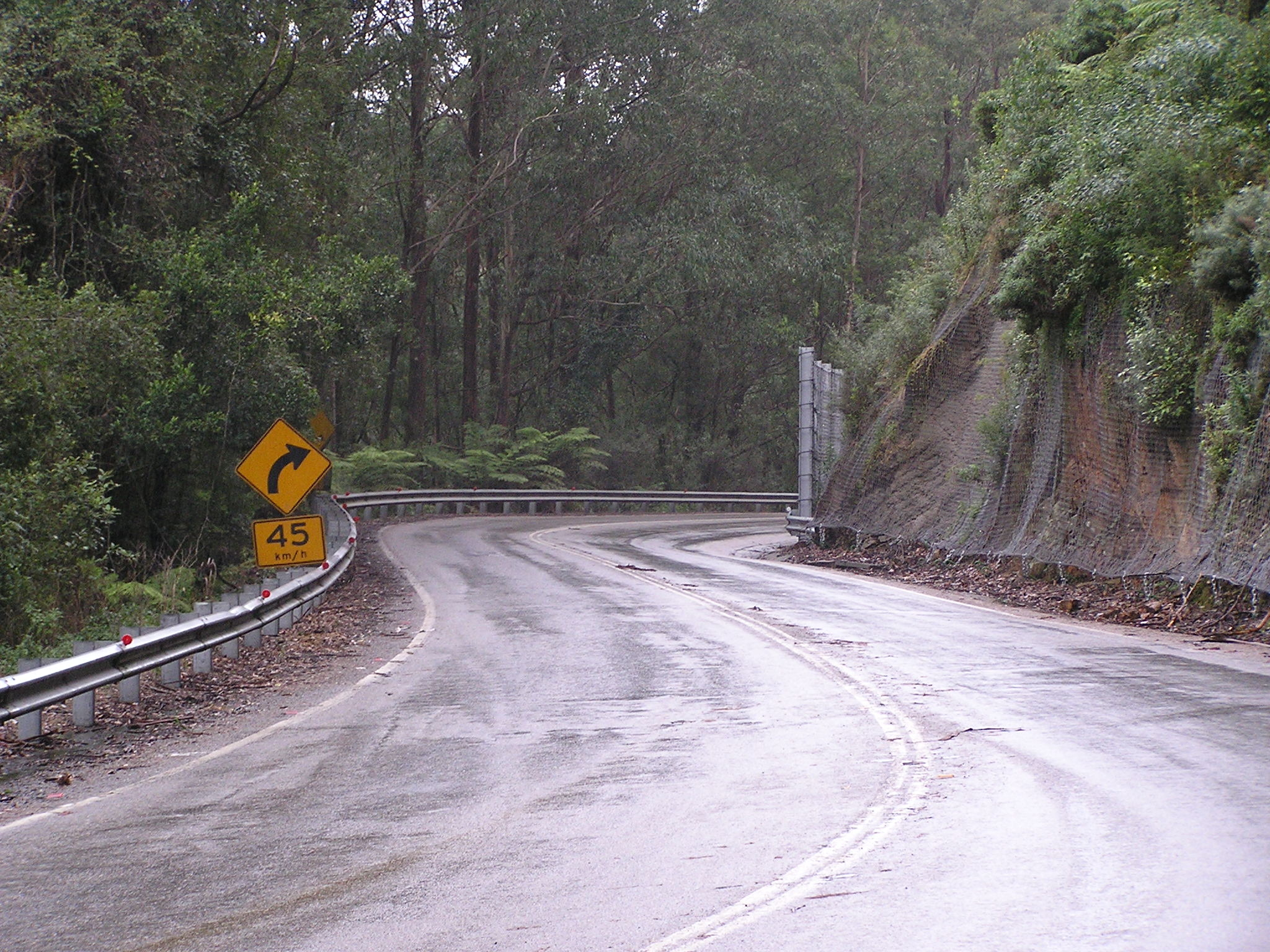
Climbing Clyde Mountain from the coast to Braidwood.

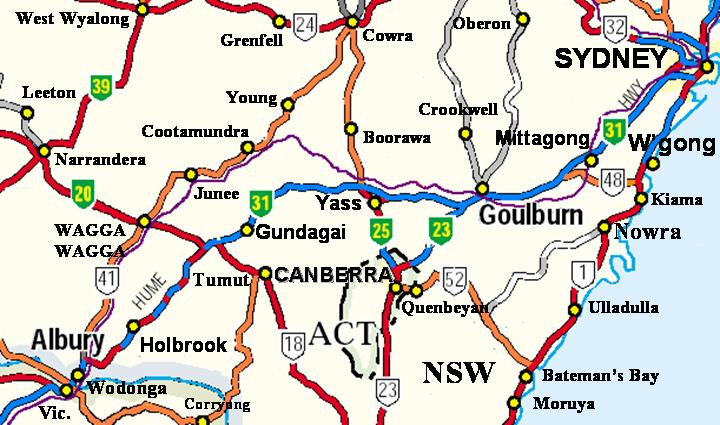
Kings Highway (formerly called Kings Way), National Route 52, links Canberrans to the coast.

== See also ==
- Highways in Australia
- List of highways in New South Wales
