= Beard, Australian Capital Territory =

Beard
- Suburb
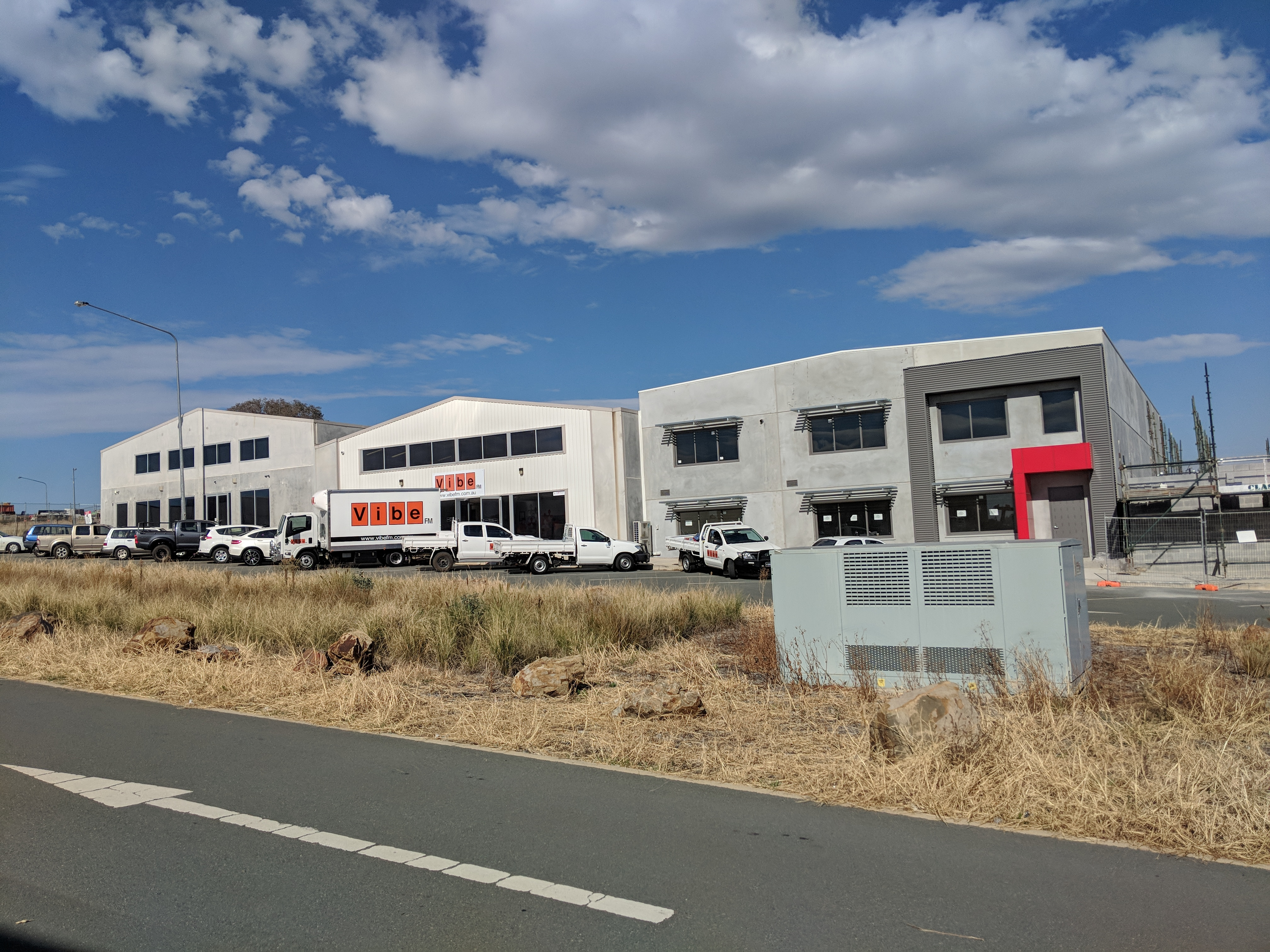

- Coordinates: 35.3413°S 149.2100°E
- Country: Australia
- State: Australian Capital Territory
- City: Canberra
- District: Jerrabomberra
- Location: 14 km (8.7 mi) SE of Canberra; 3 km (1.9 mi) WNW of Queanbeyan; 92 km (57 mi) SW of Goulburn; 289 km (180 mi) SW of Sydney

Government
  - Territory electorate: Kurrajong
  - Federal division: Canberra
- Elevation: 593 m (1,946 ft)

Population
  - Total: 3 (SAL 2021)
- Postcode: 2620
- Gazetted: 2009
Suburbs around Beard
Fyshwick	Pialligo
Symonston	Beard	Oaks Estate
HMAS Harman	Crestwood, NSW	Queanbeyan, NSW

Beard is a suburb of Canberra in the District of Jerrabomberra, Australian Capital Territory, named after ex-convict Timothy Beard, the first recorded European settler in the vicinity of modern-day Queanbeyan.

== History ==
From the time of European settlement until 1942, Beard was primarily pastoral land. In 1942, a contract was awarded to construct a Commonwealth owned abattoir in the area. Work was significantly delayed following a fire that gutted the construction site in June 1943. Sold to private investors in 1969, the Canberra abattoirs operated from 1944 until 1997.

A planning study was conducted by the ACT Government in 2004 for a proposed residential development to be known as "Griffin Green", however subsequent studies focused on industrial uses of the land in order to address a shortage of small industrial lots across both the Canberra and Queanbeyan markets. The suburb began as Fyshwick East Industrial Estate in 2009, with developer CIC Australia releasing the first lots to the market. In May of that year, the name Beard was gazetted, although for the purposes of marketing the land, the two names are used interchangeably.

== Geography ==
The suburb is located between Fyshwick and Oaks Estate, immediately north of the border with New South Wales and city of Queanbeyan, and approximately 9 km (5.6 mi) east of Canberra City. Beard consists almost entirely of a small light industrial estate. Streets in the estate are named after minerals.
