= Jerrabomberra (district) =

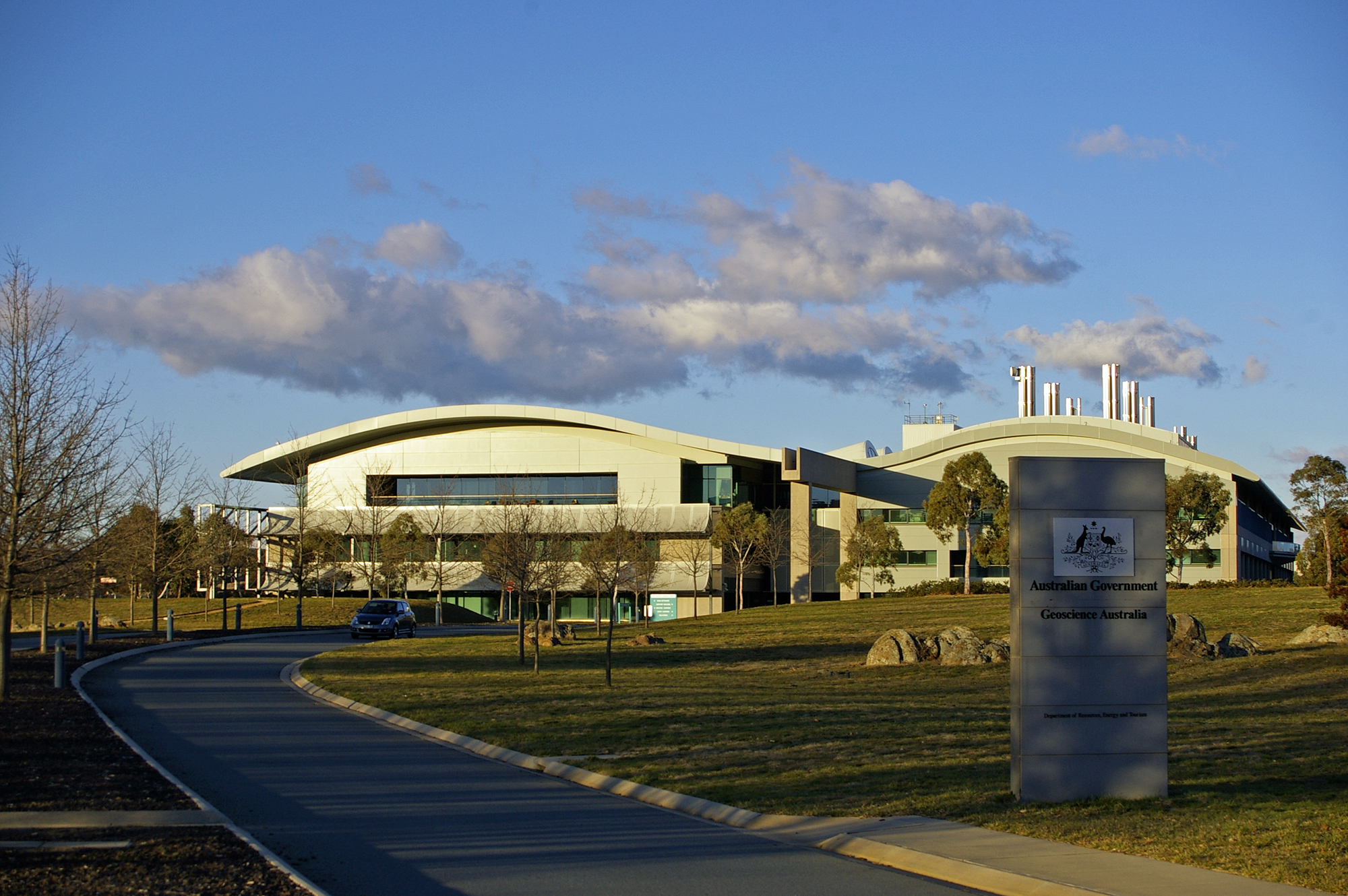
- Geoscience Australia in Symonston.

- Interactive map of Jerrabomberra
- Coordinates: 35°20′47″S 149°10′40″E
- Country: Australia
- State: Australian Capital Territory

Government
  - Territory electorate: Kurrajong
  - Federal divisions: Bean; Canberra

Population
  - Total: 1,240 (2016 census)
- Postcode: 2609, 2620
Localities around Jerrabomberra
Woden Valley	Canberra Central	Majura
Tuggeranong	Jerrabomberra	Queanbeyan
Tuggeranong	Tralee	Jerrabomberra, NSW

Jerrabomberra is a district in the Australian Capital Territory in Australia. It is situated to the southeast of Canberra Central, south of the Molonglo River, east of Woden Valley and north east of Tuggeranong and west of the New South Wales border. It includes the suburbs of Beard, Hume, Oaks Estate and Symonston and the military communications and logistics facility HMAS Harman. At the 2016 census, it had a total population of 1,240, comprising 559 in Symonston, 430 in Hume (including the Alexander Maconochie Centre) and 251 in Oaks Estate and Beard At the 2011 census, 13 also lived in Harman. It is named after Jerrabomberra Creek, which runs through it, Jerrabomberra is derived from the Aboriginal word, meaning "afraid of lightning".

Jerrabomberra includes the "urban village" of Oaks Estate, which was formerly part of Queanbeyan, broadacre uses in Symonston (including the headquarters of Geoscience Australia and the Therapeutic Goods Administration), light industry in Hume and Symonston, HMAS Harman and rural areas. It is crossed by the Monaro Highway and Canberra Avenue.

== History ==
Jerrabomberra was designated by the Districts Act of 1966 as one of the 18 districts of the Australian Capital Territory.
