= Crestwood, Queanbeyan =

Crestwood
- Suburb
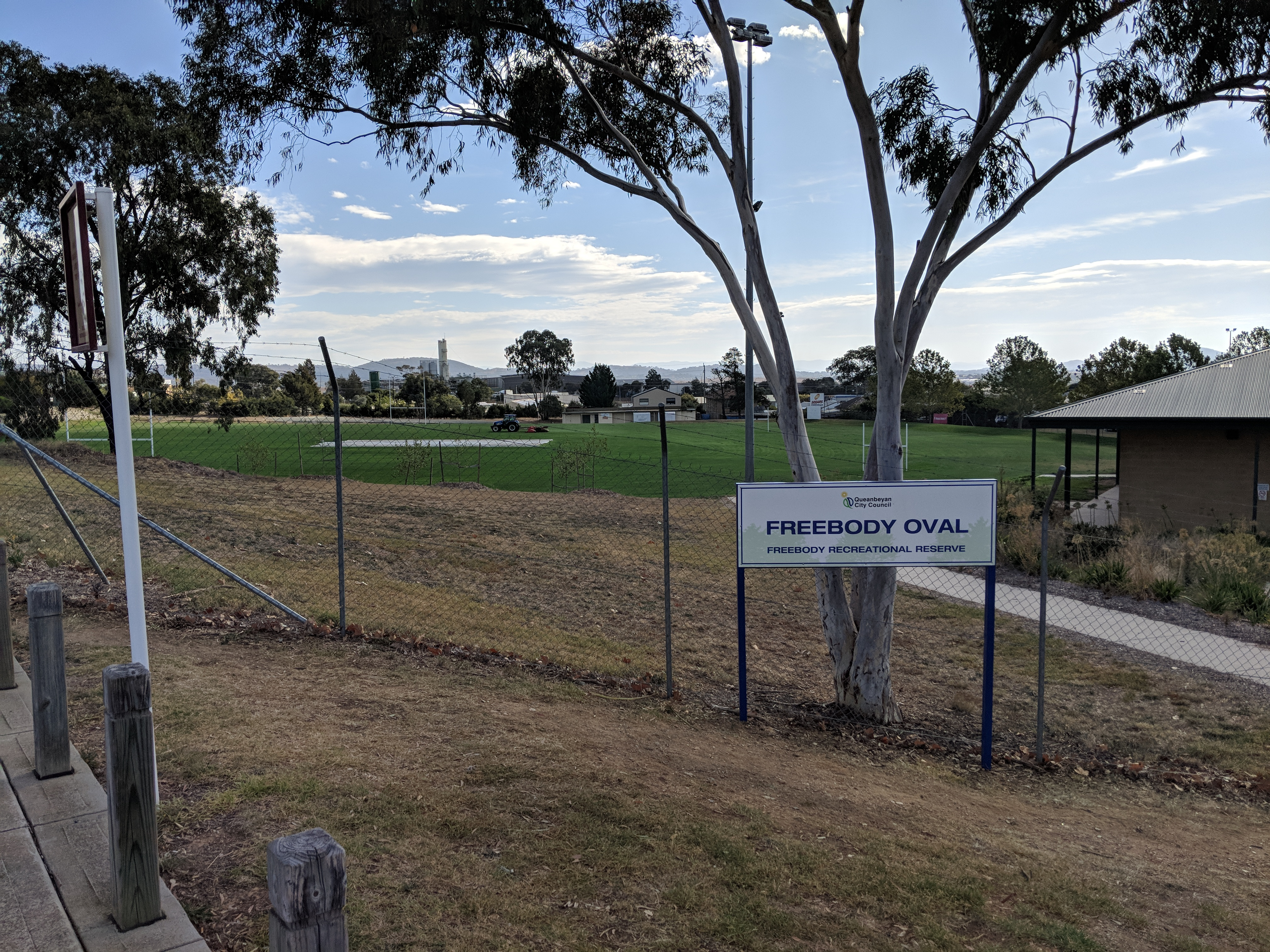
- Freebody Oval

- Interactive map of Crestwood
- Coordinates: 35.34832°S 149.21609°E
- Country: Australia
- State: New South Wales
- City: Queanbeyan
- LGA: Queanbeyan-Palerang Regional Council
- Location: 14 km (8.7 mi) SE of Canberra; 2 km (1.2 mi) W of Queanbeyan; 287 km (178 mi) SW of Sydney

Government
  - State electorate: Monaro
  - Federal division: Eden-Monaro
- Elevation: 612 m (2,008 ft)

Population
  - Total: 4,936 (2021 census)
- Postcode: 2620
- County: Murray
- Parish: Queanbeyan
Suburbs around Crestwood
Beard	Beard	Oaks Estate
HMAS Harman	Crestwood	Queanbeyan
Queanbeyan West	Karabar	Queanbeyan

Crestwood is a suburb of Queanbeyan, New South Wales, Australia. Crestwood is located west of the central business district (CBD) to the west of Ross Road and the north of Canberra Avenue and also borders the Australian Capital Territory. At the 2021 census, it had a population of 4,936.
