= North Terrace =

North Terrace may refer to:

- Holdfast Bay railway line in Adelaide, sometimes referred to as the North Terrace to Glenelg railway line
- North Terrace, Adelaide, a street
- North Terrace, Jerrabomberra in Queanbeyan, New South Wales

== See also ==
- Great Northern Terrace, a depot of the Stagecoach in Lincolnshire
