= Pialligo Avenue =

Road in Canberra, Australia

Pialligo Avenue Australian Capital Territory
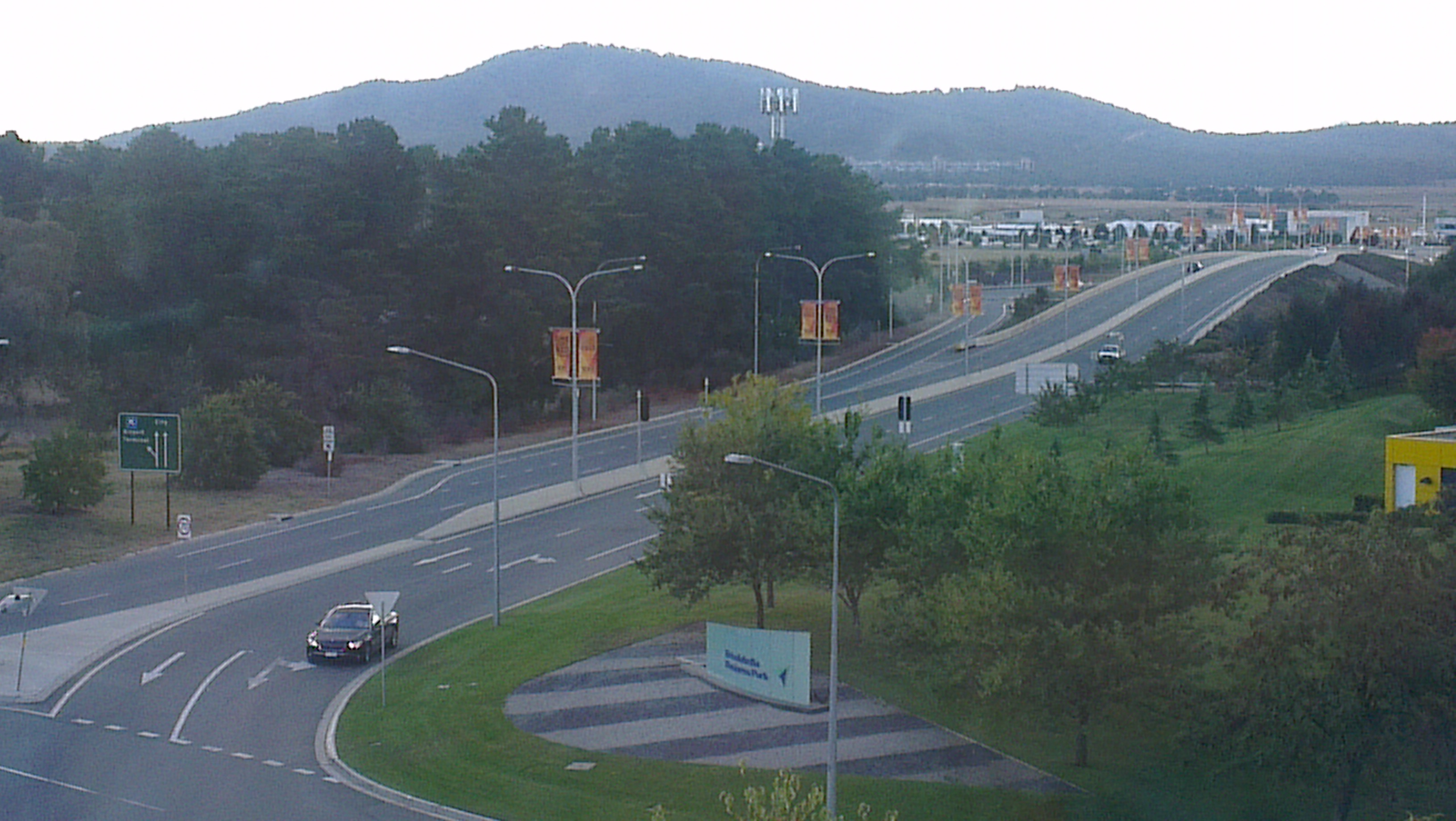

General information
- Type: Road
- Length: 7.5 km (4.7 mi)
- Former route number: ACT Tourist Drive 3 (through Pialligo)

Major junctions
- West end: Morshead Drive; Pialligo, Australian Capital Territory
- Monaro Highway; Fairbairn Avenue; Oaks Estate Road; Sutton Road
- East end: Yass Road; Oaks Estate, Australian Capital Territory

Location(s)
- Major suburbs: Pialligo

Pialligo Avenue is a major arterial road in Canberra, the Capital city of Australia. It forms part of the corridor linking the city to Canberra Airport at Pialligo, and Fairbairn. It is also the most direct route from Queanbeyan to the airport precinct. Completed in 2009, a $16 million upgrade of Pialligo Avenue associated with the expansion of the airport saw the road upgraded to dual carriageway standard between its western terminus at the Monaro Highway and the Brindabella Business Park. These works included a grade separated intersection providing access to the redeveloped passenger terminal via a loop road. Substantial upgrades were also carried out at the intersection with Fairbairn Avenue. An estimated 30,000 vehicles use the road daily.

== Living history ==
Just to the east of the Airport on Pialligo Avenue is the Redwood forest planted in 1918 by the city's designer, Walter Burley Griffin.
