= Environa, New South Wales =

Environa
- Suburb
- Interactive map of Environa
- Coordinates: 35°24′S 149°11′E
- Country: Australia
- State: New South Wales
- City: Queanbeyan
- LGA: Queanbeyan–Palerang
- Location: 20 km (12 mi) S of Canberra; 9 km (5.6 mi) SW of Queanbeyan; 302 km (188 mi) SW of Sydney
- Established: 1924

Government
  - State electorate: Monaro
  - Federal division: Eden-Monaro
- Elevation: 630 m (2,070 ft)

Population
  - Total: 0 (2016)
- Postcode: 2620
Suburbs around Environa
Hume	Jerrabomberra	Jerrabomberra
Hume	Environa	Jerrabomberra
Tralee	Tralee	Googong

Environa is a suburb and locality of Queanbeyan, located in the Queanbeyan–Palerang Regional Council, in New South Wales, Australia, west of Jerrabomberra Creek and nearby the New South Wales and Australian Capital Territory border. The development was described as a planned community, but it did not come to fruition. However, Environa has since been allocated as part of the South Jerrabomerra development of Queanbeyan for proposed development, including the proposed developments of Tralee and Poplars.

== History ==
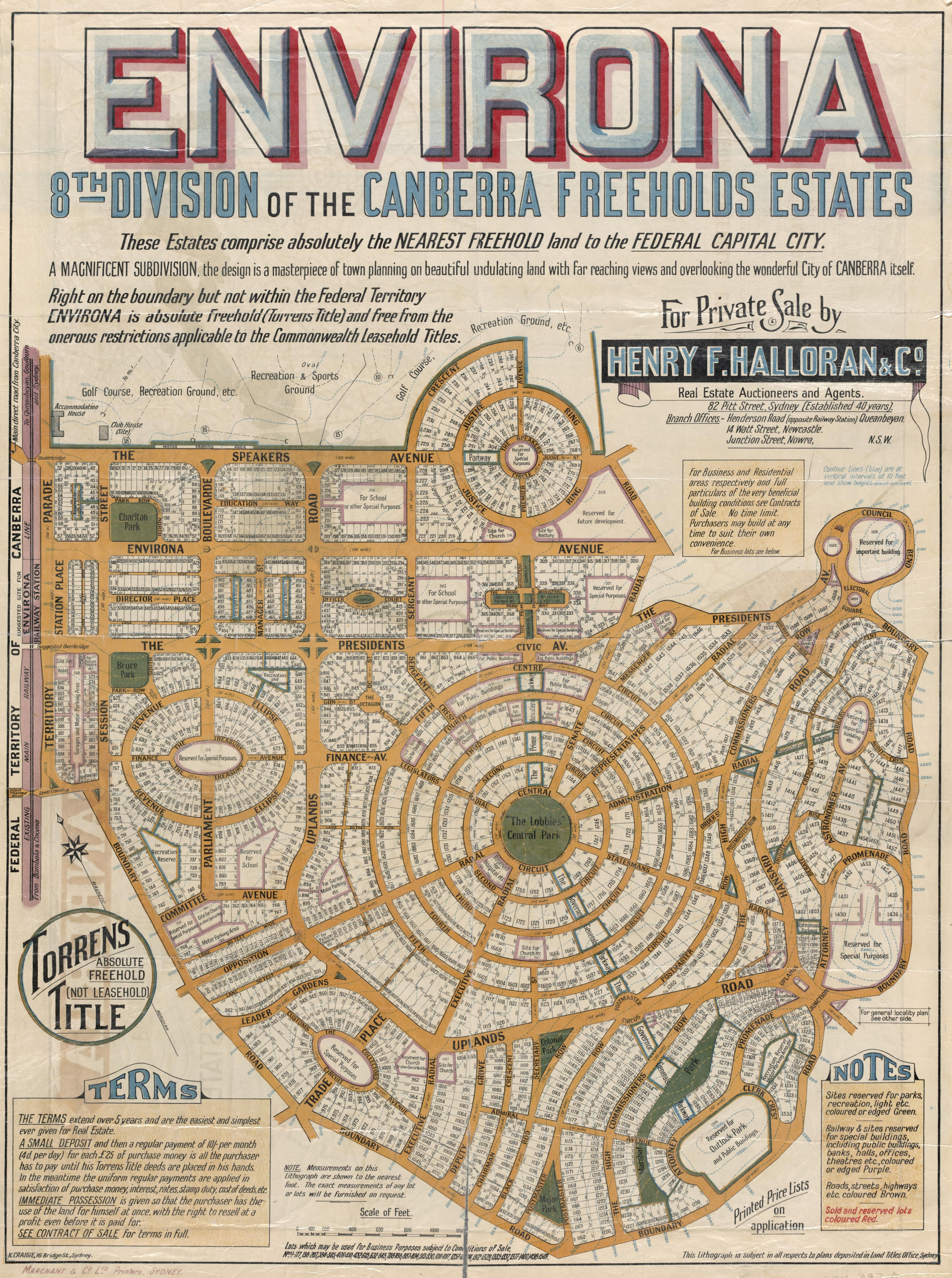
Promotional map of Environa.

The land itself was originally a subdivision of the grazing property known as Hill Station. It lies just east of the Queanbeyan-Cooma railway line as it goes past the industrial estate of Hume, ACT.

Henry Ferdinand Halloran, an enterprising developer, bought the property at auction in 1924 and began planning the future city. Halloran emphasised the future promise of the region, being the closest freehold (Torrens title) land to the new federal territory.

Plans for the northern part of the subdivision, called Canberra Freehold Estate, included space for offices, shops, a hospital and theatres. Some of the street names were Rue de Paris, Piazza di Roma and Tokio Dori. Halloran built stone monuments on the southern part of the estate, which included an arch at the entrance, rows of stone pillars along the entrance route, and a statue of Henry Parkes on a tall column. A bandstand was built, which had corrugated iron roof supported by tree trunks, and a platform. The main top-mast of HMAS Sydney was erected, but it rotted at the base and collapsed, and was later moved to Jervis Bay.

No blocks were sold and the planned development never went ahead, with the Great Depression killing off the project. The Queanbeyan Council resumed the land to the north, because of unpaid rates, and it later became part of South Queanbeyan. Henry Halloran died in 1953, aged 84, and the property at Environa was inherited by his daughter, Joyce Larcombe. A house was built there in 1971. Halloran's company, Reality Realizations, still controlled extensive landholdings around Queanbeyan into the 1970s.

Between 1926 and 1956, there was a railway station just the north of Environa, on the Bombala railway line. It was named Letchworth, after Letchworth Garden City in England, a name was suggested by Halloran. It was closer to another unrealised Halloran sub-division, Letchworth, but would have also served Environa if the sub-division had been developed.

The originally planned street layout of Environa, which was never constructed, has been marked on Google Maps and Apple Maps, and was still visible in early 2021 at a high level of zoom. However, that is no longer the case, due to the commencement of major development works associated the South Jerrabomberra development, at Tralee, just south-east of the locality of Environa. A new main road, Environa Drive, has been constructed, and it will link the newly developed area to Tompsitt Drive. A reason that the area has remained undeveloped for so long was the concern that any housing would be affected adversely by aircraft noise if Canberra Airport was expanded.

== Geography ==
Environa lies on the lower slopes of the Pemberton Hill to the south. It is 620 metres (2,030 ft) to 660 metres (2,170 ft) above sea level. The rocks are acid volcanics, rhyodacite and rhyolite from the Deakin Volcanics, which solidified 414±9 Mya.
