= Queanbeyan West =

- Suburb
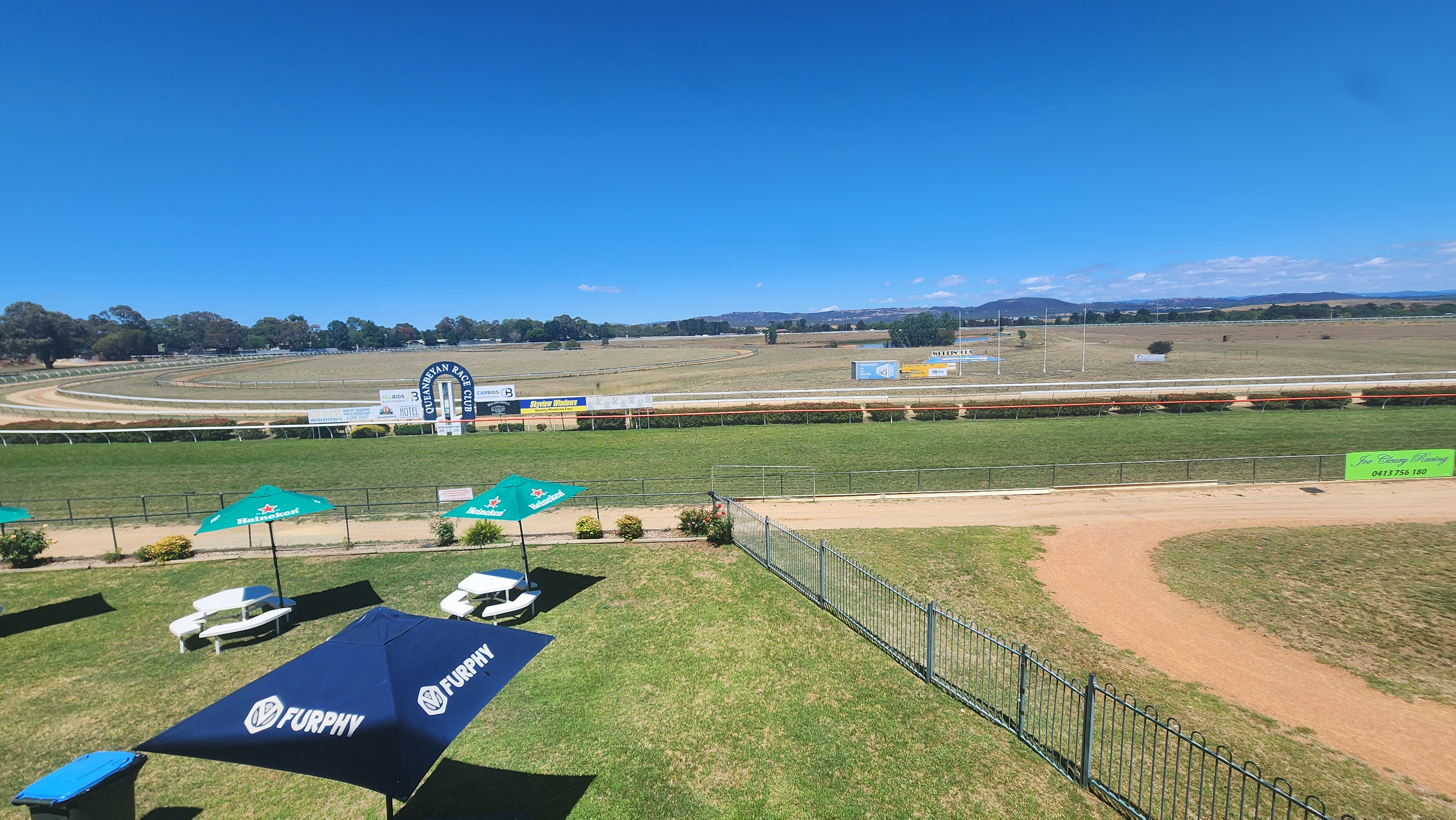
- Queanbeyan Race Course

- Interactive map of Queanbeyan West
- Coordinates: 35.3572°S 149.2090°E
- Country: Australia
- State: New South Wales
- City: Queanbeyan
- LGA: Queanbeyan-Palerang Regional Council

Government
  - State electorate: Monaro
  - Federal division: Eden-Monaro

Population
  - Total: 3,146 (2021 census)
- Postcode: 2620
- County: Murray
- Parish: Queanbeyan
Suburbs around Queanbeyan West
HMAS Harman	Crestwood	Queanbeyan
	Queanbeyan West	Queanbeyan
Jerrabomberra	Jerrabomberra	Karabar

Queanbeyan West is a suburb of Queanbeyan, New South Wales, Australia. Queanbeyan West is located west of the central business district (CBD) and also borders the Australian Capital Territory, it is located south of Crestwood and Canberra Avenue and west of Tharwa Road. At the 2021 census, it had a population of 3,146.
