= Clyde Mountain =

Mountain in New South Wales, Australia

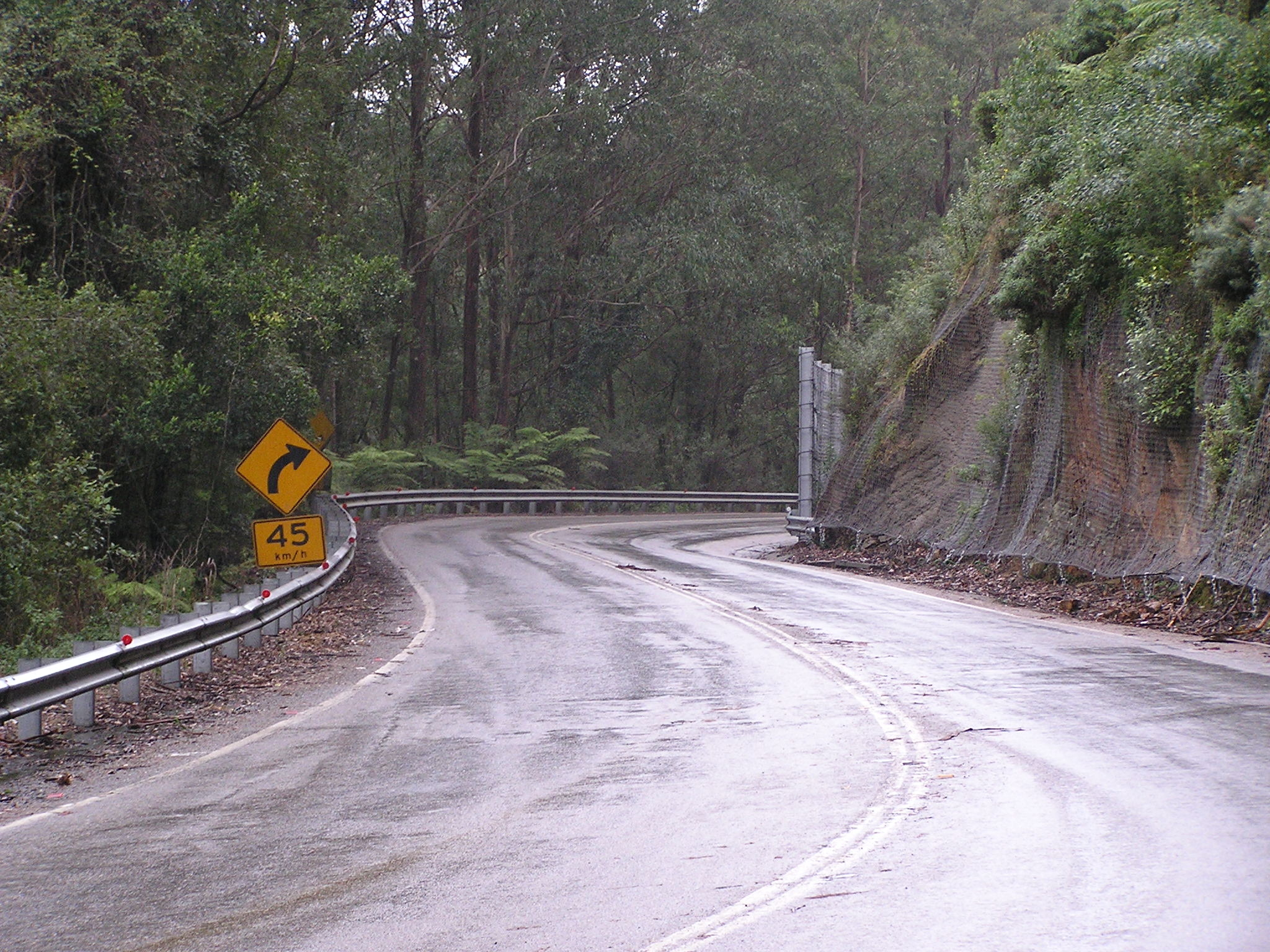
- Kings Highway, ascending Clyde Mountain, heading west towards Braidwood.

Highest point
- Elevation: 781 m (2,562 ft)
- Coordinates: 35°32′55″S 149°57′4″E

Geography
- Location within New South Wales Location within Australia
- Location: Southern Tablelands region, New South Wales, Australia
- Parent range: Great Dividing Range

Climbing
- Easiest route: Kings Highway

Clyde Mountain, at an elevation of 874 metres (2,867 ft) AHD, is a mountain in the Southern Tablelands region of New South Wales, Australia.

== Location and features ==
Clyde Mountain is located in the Great Dividing Range within the Monga National Park. The mountain is approximately 18 kilometres (11 mi) east of the town of Braidwood, approximately 20 kilometres (12 mi) from the village of Nelligen, and approximately 27 kilometres (17 mi) west of the main coastal centre of Batemans Bay on the NSW South Coast.

The road leading up towards the summit of Clyde Mountain is a steep, winding, 5-kilometre (3.1 mi) section of the Kings Highway. It is the location of many crashes, 22% of all incidents on the Kings Highway occurring on a 40 kilometres (25 mi) stretch on and near the mountain. There are three safety ramps (runaway truck ramps) for trucks or heavy vehicles which lose control of their speed or suffer brake failure. Slow vehicle turnouts have been added on the Clyde Mountain descent, which allows vehicles to pass trucks in low gear.
