= Canberra Outlet Centre =

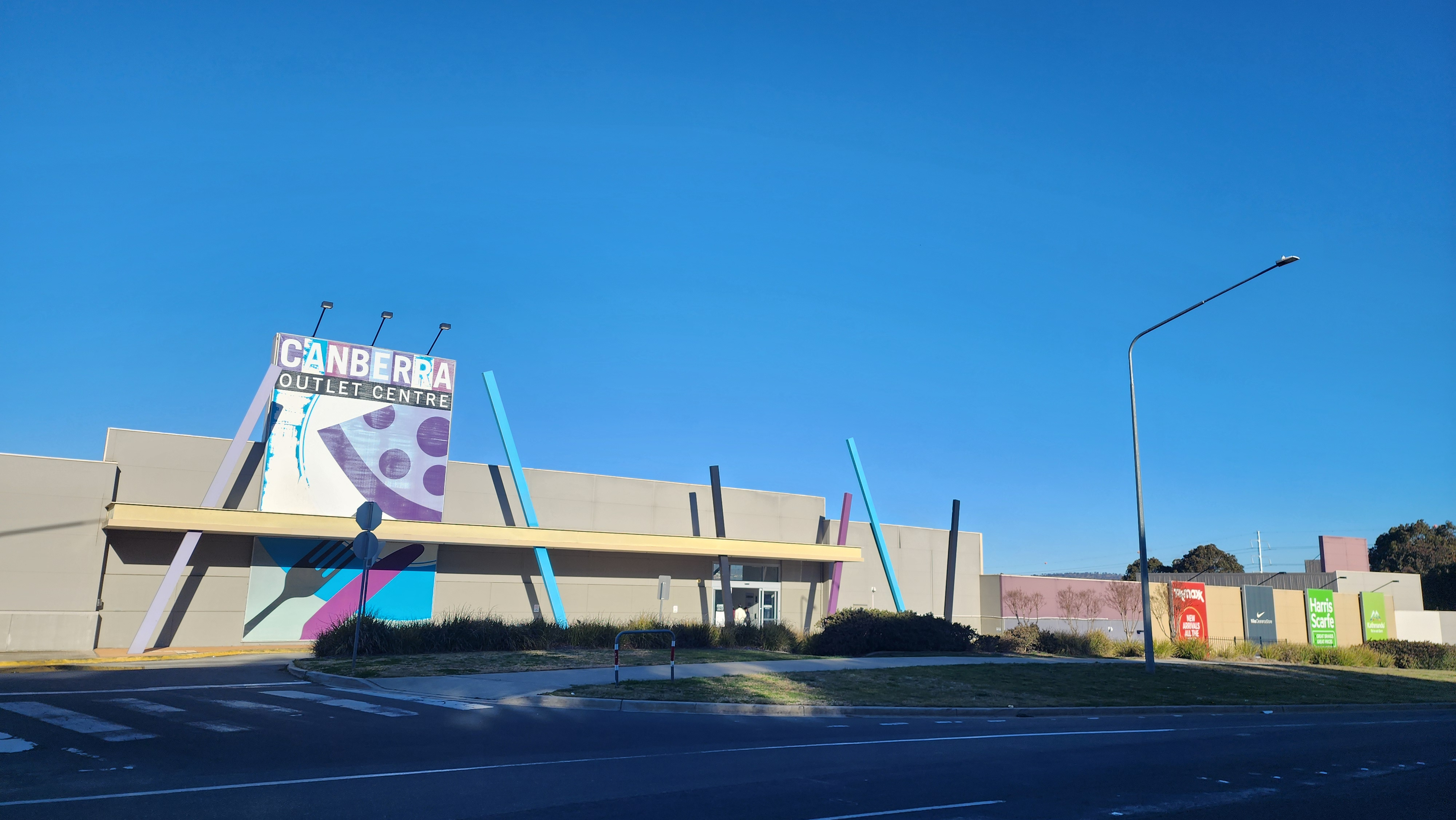
- Newcastle Street view
- Location: 337 Canberra Avenue, Fyshwick, Australian Capital Territory
- Coordinates: 35.33660°S 149.17846°E
- Opened: September 2008
- Num. of stores: 124
- Floor area: 45,300m^{2}
- Floors: 1
- Parking: 2000+
- Website: canberraoutletcentre.com.au

Canberra Outlet Centre (formerly known as DFO Canberra and Homemaker Hub and Direct Factory Outlets Canberra) is an outlet type discount shopping centre located on the edge of Fyshwick, a light industrial suburb located in the southeast of Canberra. In addition to providing retail space for 100 specialty outlet stores, the Homewares/Furniture section of the centre is designed for 24 bulky goods retailers, such as furniture and electrical chains. Unlike many other outlet centres, the Canberra site is not adjacent to an airport.

== History ==
Austexx acquired land at Fyshwick in 2005 at a reported cost of $39 million following a bidding war with the owners of Canberra Airport. In a move reminiscent of the 2004 Orange Grove affair, an unsuccessful legal challenge under the Trade Practices Act over the zoning of the site was brought against DFO by the Canberra Airport's rival venture, Brand Depot.

Construction of the shopping centre involved clearing the greenfield site located adjacent to the junction of two major arterial roads, Canberra Avenue and Hindmarsh Drive. The centre, car parks and loading dock areas occupy 120,000m^{2} over two levels, with the car park below the retail floor. The building was completed on behalf of DFO's parent company Austexx by construction firm Contexx Pty Ltd in September 2008 at an approximate cost of $100 million.

In March 2012, the Canberra DFO was announced as being placed in receivership by its struggling parent company.

In 2013, it was renamed Canberra Outlet Centre (COC).

In March 2017 the 44,870 square metre shopping precinct was purchased by Armada Funds Management on behalf of Deka Immobilien.
