= Fyshwick =

Retail and light industry suburb of Canberra, Australia

- Suburb
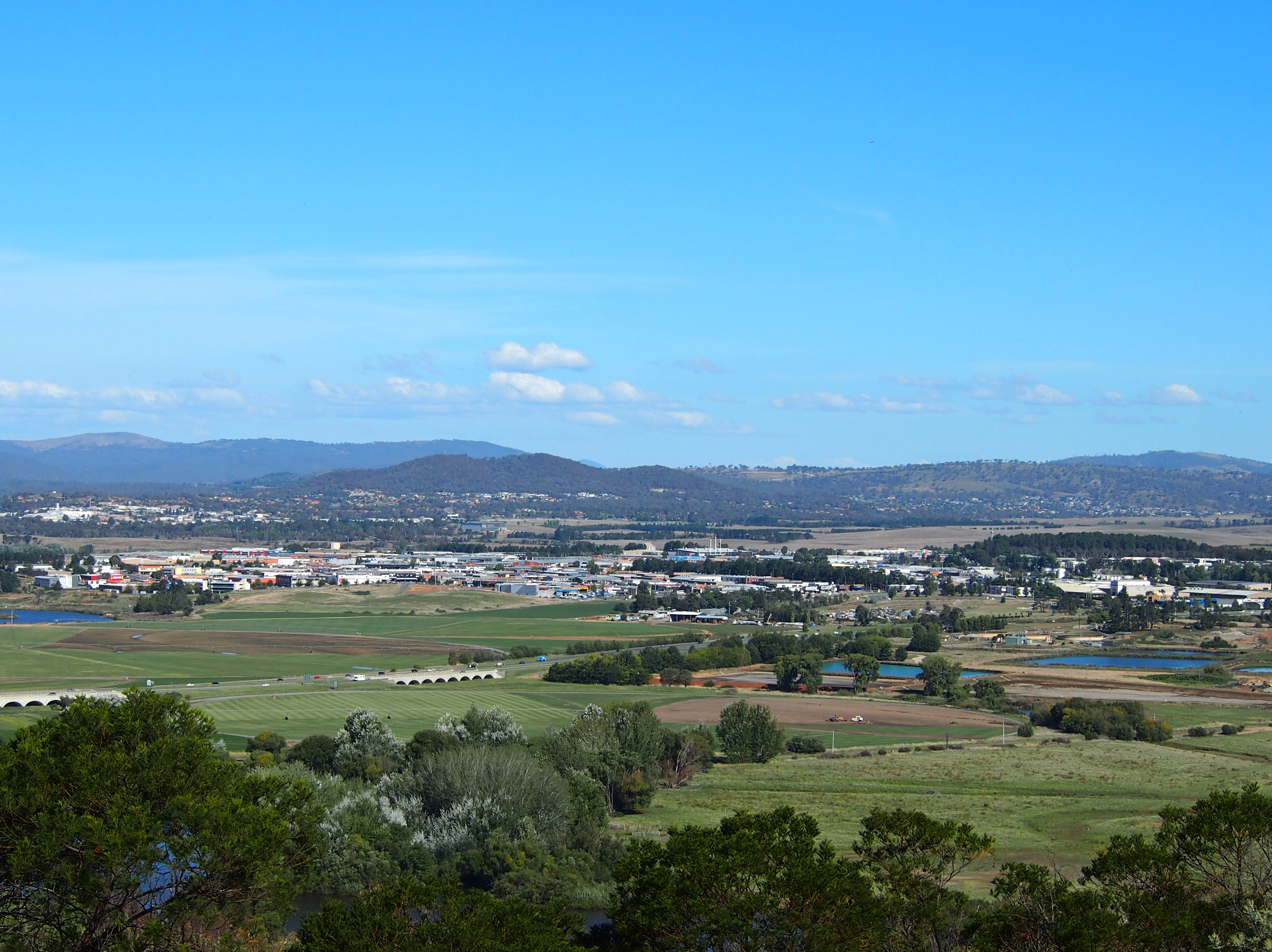
- Fyshwick viewed from Mount Pleasant c. 2013

- Coordinates: 35°19′44″S 149°10′26″E
- Country: Australia
- State: Australian Capital Territory
- City: Canberra
- District: South Canberra
- Location: 9 km (5.6 mi) SE of Canberra CBD; 9 km (5.6 mi) W of Queanbeyan; 93 km (58 mi) SW of Goulburn; 290 km (180 mi) SW of Sydney

Government
  - Territory electorate: Kurrajong
  - Federal division: Canberra

Area
  - Total: 9.76 km^{2} (3.77 sq mi)
- Elevation: 577 m (1,893 ft)

Population
  - Total: 52 (SAL 2021)
- Postcode: 2609
- Gazetted: 20 September 1928
Suburbs around Fyshwick
Barton	Campbell	Pialligo
Kingston	Fyshwick	Beard
Griffith	Narrabundah	Symonston

Fyshwick (/fɪʃwɪk/) is a retail and light industrial suburb of Canberra, Australia, east of the South Canberra district. At the 2016 census, Fyshwick had a population of 56.

It has many motor vehicle dealers, stores selling home furnishings and hardware, and stores that sell goods wholesale. Fyshwick also has the Canberra Outlet Centre and the Fyshwick Fresh Food Markets. There are also some cafés and fast-food outlets.

It was named after Sir Philip Fysh, a Tasmanian politician who assisted in bringing about Australia's Federation. The suffix "wick", from Old English, means "dwelling place" – and, by extension, "village" or "district". Its streets are named after Australia's industrial towns and regions – for example, Mount Isa is represented by Isa Street and Townsville is represented by Townsville Street.

Fyshwick is also known for its adult entertainment industry. Fyshwick and Mitchell are the two places in the ACT where strip clubs and brothels may operate legally. Prostitution in the ACT was decriminalised in 1992, but strip clubs and brothels are restricted to those two suburbs. Fyshwick was also known for firework retailers before their 2009 ban from public purchase in the Australian Capital Territory.

The only railway line into Canberra runs through the middle of Fyshwick, dividing the area into halves. Ipswich and Newcastle Streets as well as the Monaro Highway cross the railway line, uniting both halves of Fyshwick.

The Fyshwick sewage treatment works was built in 1967 to treat waste water that could not easily be pumped to the other side of Canberra. It is now used to treat industrial waste water, which is then used to water the Duntroon grounds and golf course.

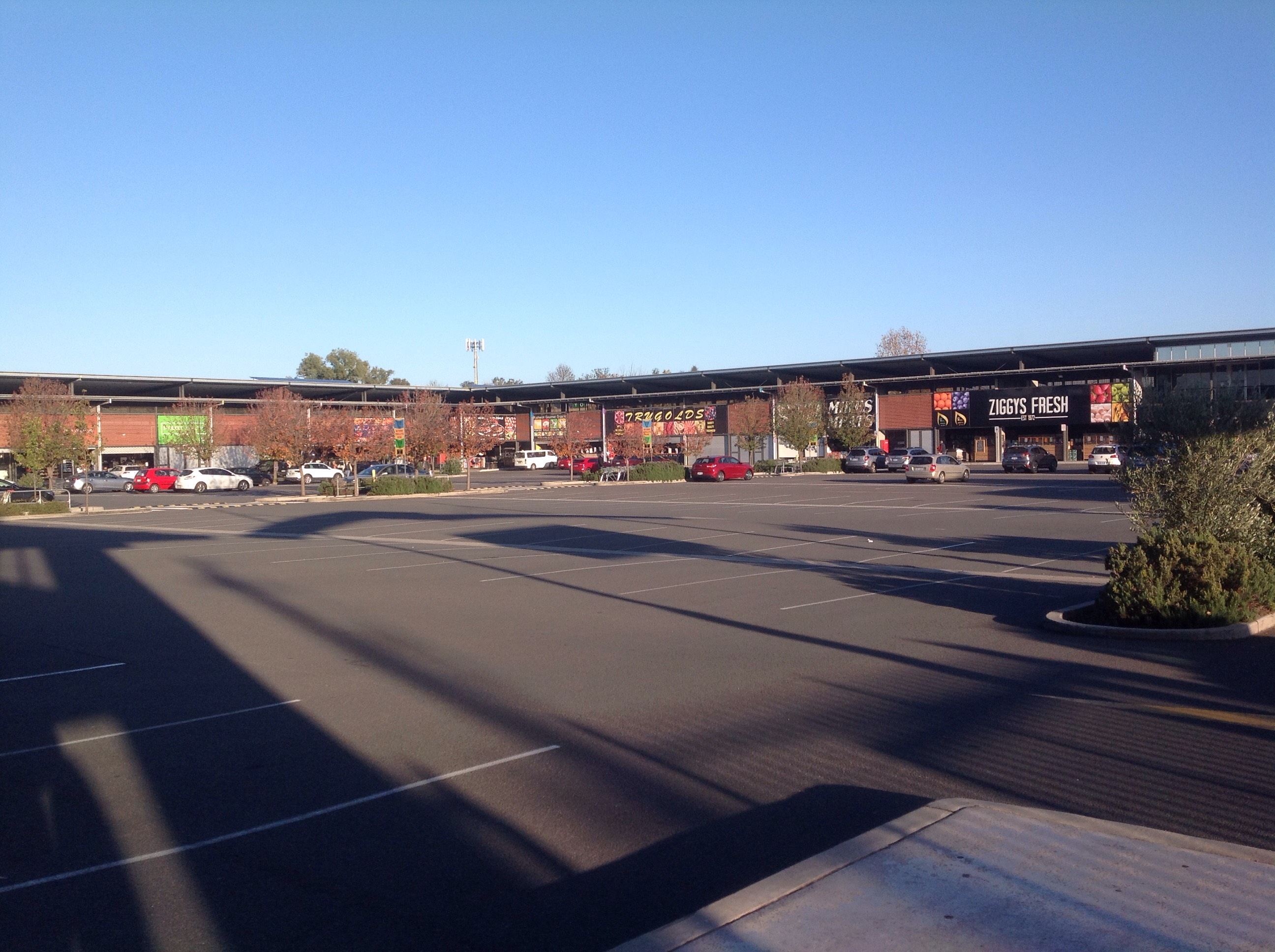
Fyshwick Fresh Food Markets

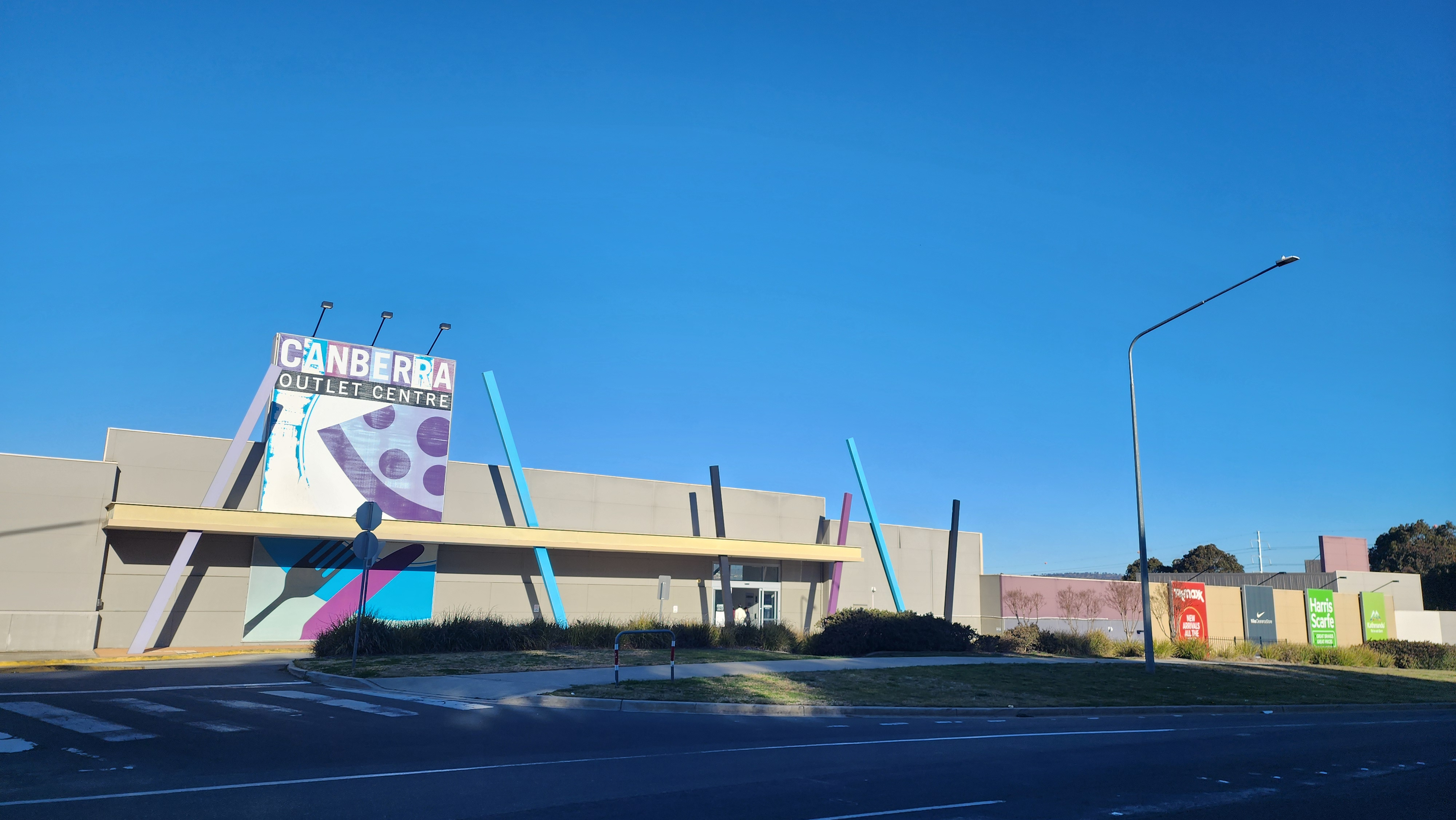
Canberra Outlet Centre

== History ==
One noteworthy portion of Fyshwick, located between the railway line and Canberra Avenue, was built as an internment camp during early 1918. It was known as the Molonglo Internment Camp, although it was also referred to as a concentration camp. The site was intended to accommodate 3,500 German and Austrian nationals being expelled from China, however once the camp had been established in May 1918 these internees were no longer destined for Molonglo. Instead, the camp housed 150 internees transferred from the Bourke Camp in New South Wales. The camp was closed in late 1919 after the internees were deported to Germany. Most of the camp's buildings were sold off, with the remaining buildings being converted to house construction workers, some of whom were unemployed returned servicemen. It was then called Molonglo Settlement. Gradually the camp buildings were moved to other camp sites around Canberra and the roads used to service the camp became the first streets of Fyshwick.

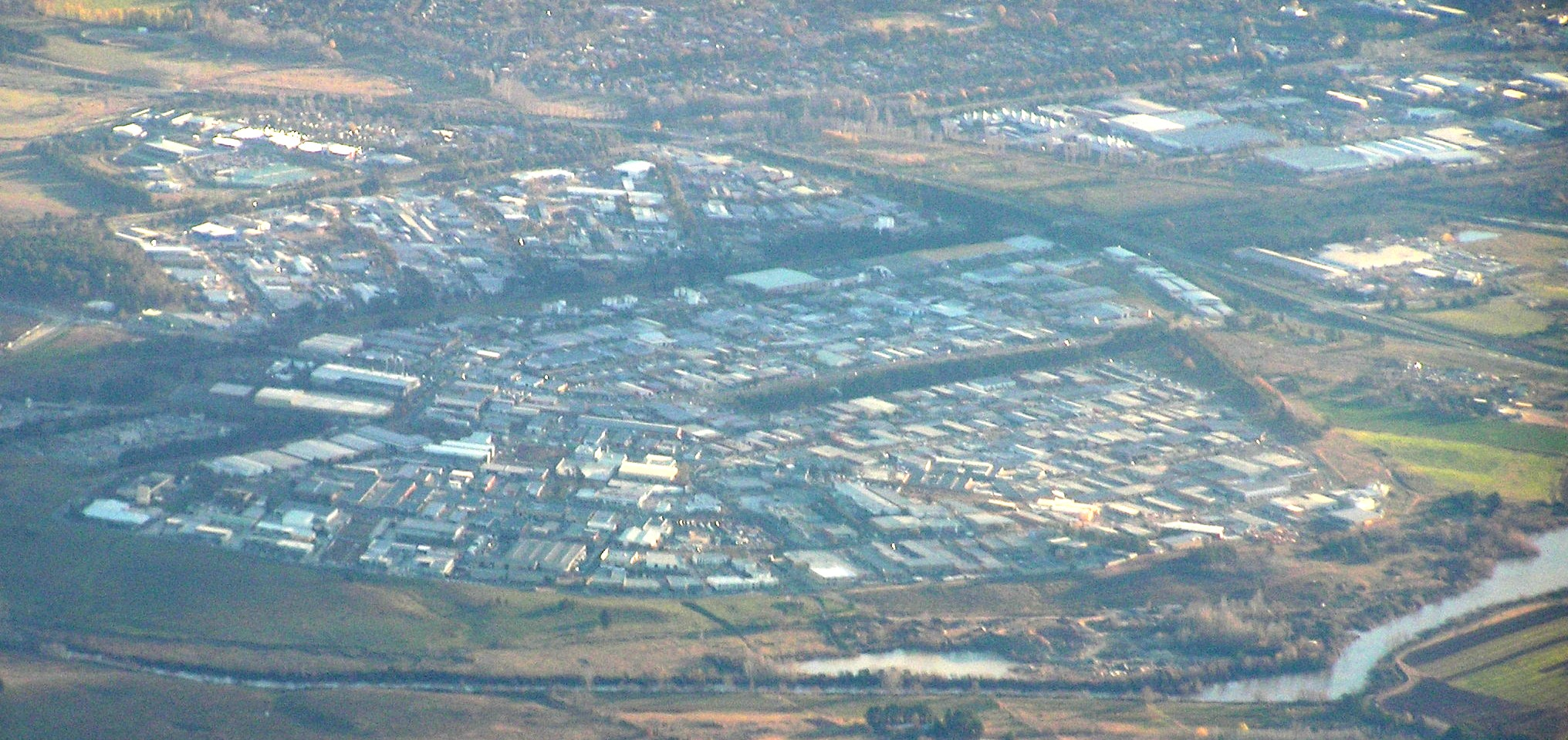
Fyshwick from the northeast

The internment camp's hospital at what is now Tennant Street became the Molonglo Public School. This school closed in 1942 and then became a naval auxiliary wireless station. This operated until 1946. The station consisted of one wooden T-shaped building and a fibro mess hall. This station operated the receivers for the strategic fixed radio links to Australia for Whitehall, Halifax and Bombay Fort. During this period 14 WRANS operated the equipment. Marion Stevens was a Petty Officer in charge of the station from 1943 to 1946. She was notable as the only woman in charge of a transmitting station.

The station was part of the Harman radio network, as was connected via a landline to the main Harman site. Equipment at the Molonglo station included teleprinters for use when reception was good. During poorer radio propagation periods morse code radiotelegraphy had to be used.

After the war the Molonglo station became a dog training school. In the early 1980s the buildings were demolished.

== Geology ==
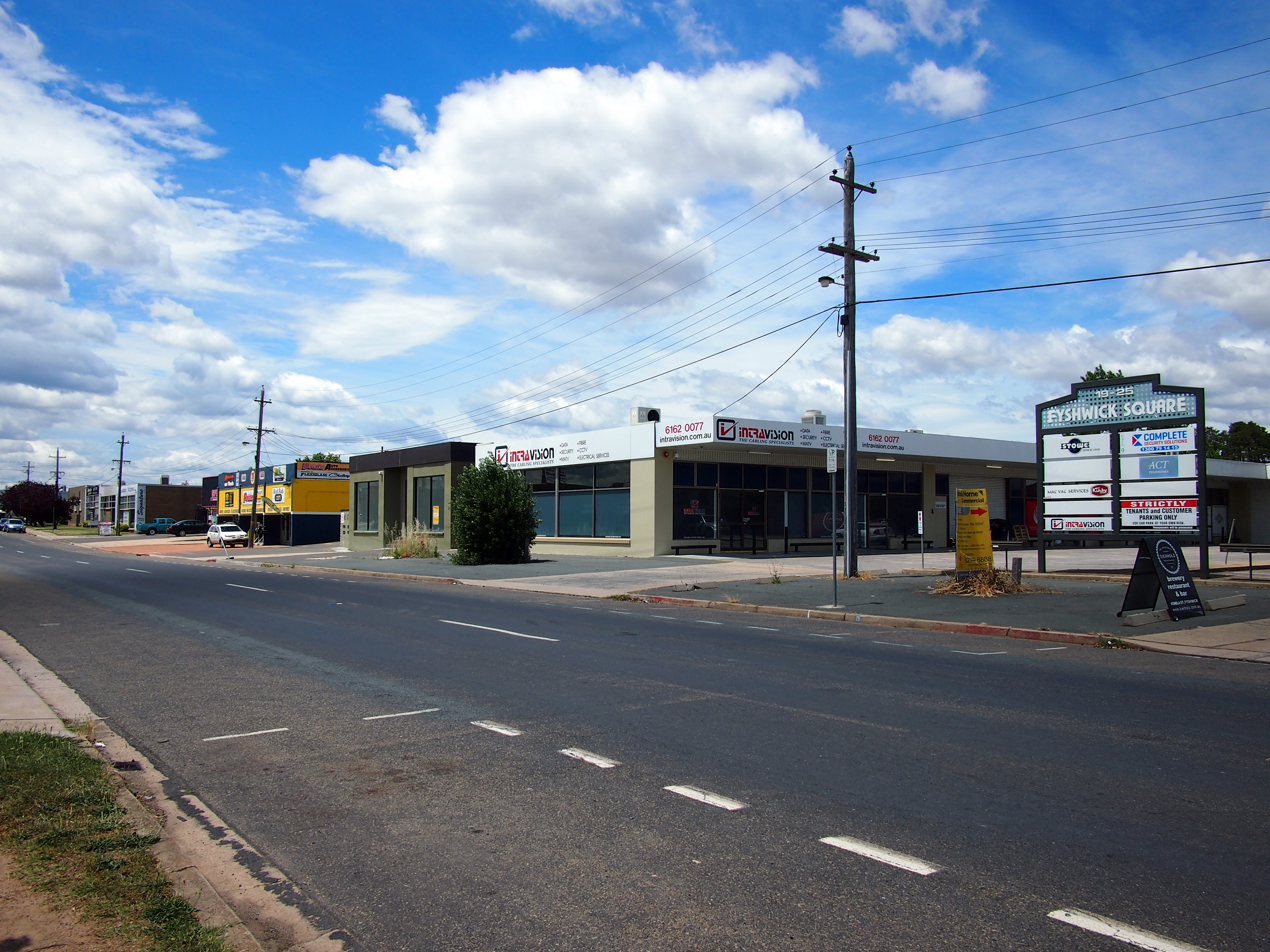
A typical streetscape in Fyshwick

Most of the north of Fyshwick is underlain by Canberra Formation, calcareous shale. On top of this to the east and west of Jerrabomberra creek are Tertiary pebble gravels, and also quaternary alluvium. There are two andesite dykes intruded across Gladstone Street.

South of the South Fyshwick fault is the dacitic andesite of the Ainslie Volcanics.

The South Fyshwick Fault starts in Narrabundah, runs east from Lithgow St to Tennant Street, crosses the Molonglo river and heads north east to Dundee Hill to join Sullivans Fault.

== Education ==
Fyshwick residents get preference for:

- A shared Priority Enrollment Area (PEA) of Forrest Primary and Red Hill Primary
- Telopea Park School (for high school)
- Narrabundah College
