= Mugga Lane Solar Park =

Solar power station

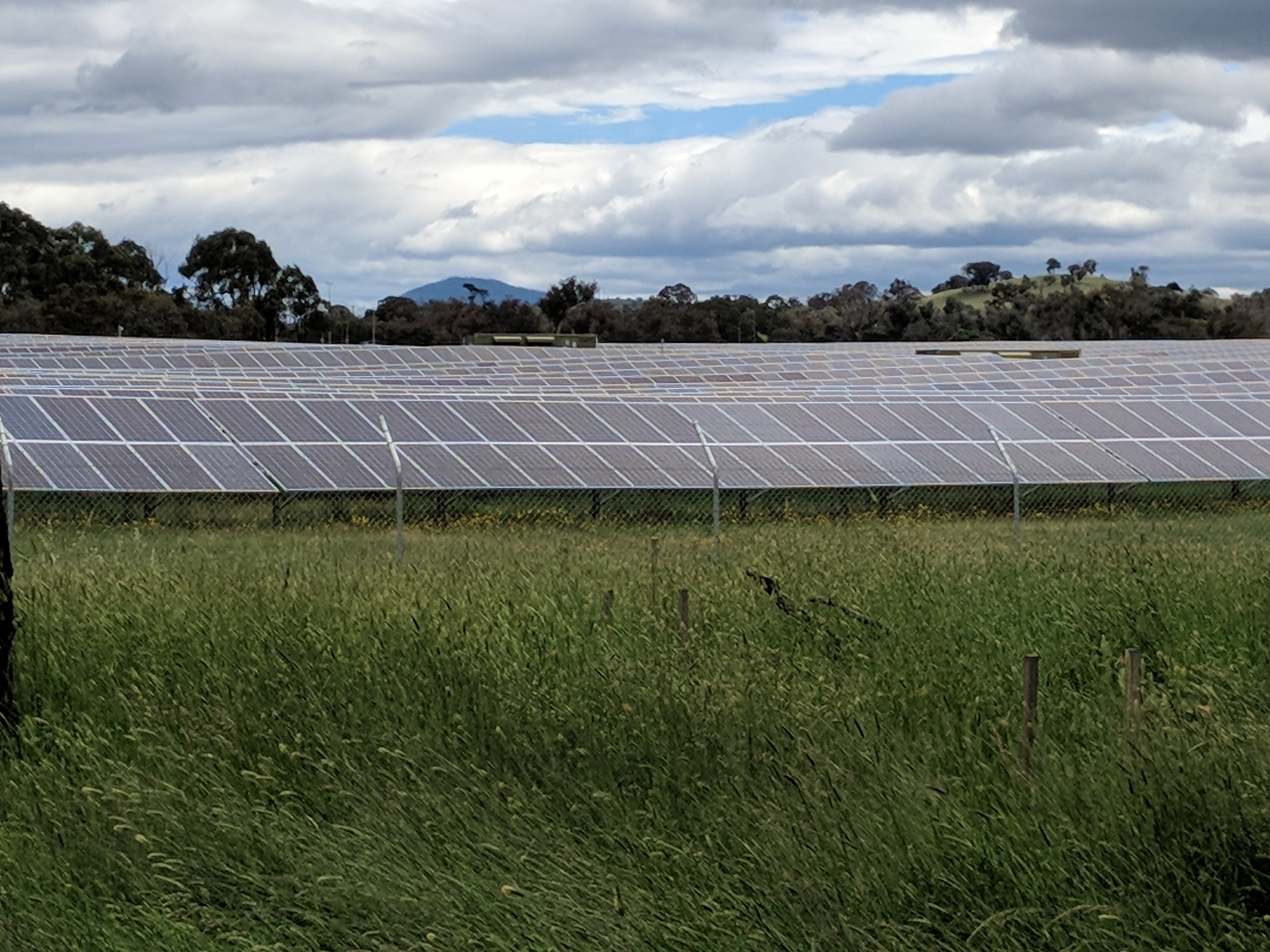
- Country: Australia
- Location: Hume, Australian Capital Territory
- Coordinates: 35°24′00″S 149°08′44″E
- Status: Operational
- Commission date: March 2017
- Operator: Maoneng

Solar farm
- Type: Flat-panel PV
- Collectors: 53,000

Power generation
- Nameplate capacity: 13 MW

External links
- Website: mlsolarpark.com.au

Mugga Lane Solar Park is a photovoltaic solar power station at Hume in the Australian Capital Territory.

Construction of the Mugga Lane Solar Park at Mugga Lane was completed in March 2017. It is owned by the Maoneng Group, which has been contracted by the Government of the Australian Capital Territory to produce up to 24,600 megawatt hours each year for up to $4.38 million.

The Mugga Lane Solar Park uses sheep for grass and weed control under the solar panels.

== See also ==
- Hume, Australian Capital Territory
