= Karabar =

- Suburb
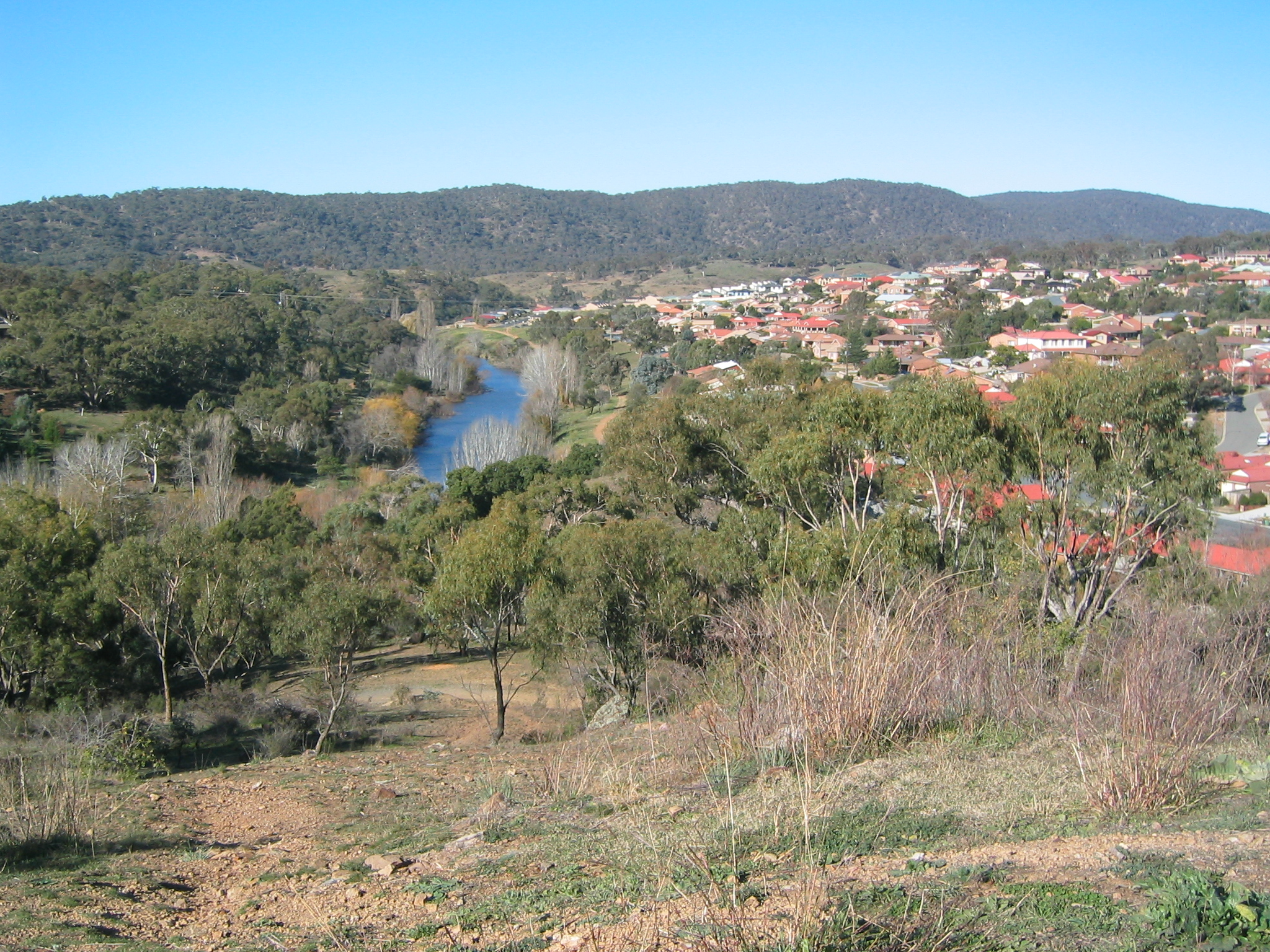

- Interactive map of Karabar
- Coordinates: 35°22′S 149°14′E
- Country: Australia
- State: New South Wales
- City: Queanbeyan
- LGA: Queanbeyan-Palerang Regional Council
- Location: 21 km (13 mi) SE of Canberra; 5 km (3.1 mi) S of Queanbeyan; 291 km (181 mi) SW of Sydney

Government
  - State electorate: Monaro
  - Federal division: Eden-Monaro
- Elevation: 609 m (1,998 ft)

Population
  - Total: 8,517 (2021 census)
- Postcode: 2620
- County: Murray
- Parish: Queanbeyan
Suburbs around Karabar
Crestwood	Queanbeyan	Queanbeyan
Queanbeyan West	Karabar	Queanbeyan East
Jerrabomberra	Googong	Greenleigh

Karabar is a suburb of Queanbeyan, New South Wales. It is at the southern part of the developed area of Queanbeyan, bordering the suburbs of Queanbeyan East, Jerrabomberra, Googong and Queanbeyan. The eastern border of the suburb is defined by the Queanbeyan River. As well as a shopping centre it contains netball courts, several ovals and public high and primary schools. It is dominated by Mount Jerrabomberra, which overlooks the suburb. At the 2021 census, Karabar had a population of 8,517 people.

The Karabar High School and Distance Education Centre is a state public high school for years 7 to 12, located in Karabar.

The distance education centre serves students unable to attend school because of geographic isolation, illness, vocational talent, religious and other reasons, in the southern part of NSW as well as Australians living overseas and students from smaller private and state high schools that are unable to offer specialist subjects such as languages, extension mathematics and software design and development.

The high school provides education for students in academic, vocational and employment streams leading to the award of the NSW Higher School Certificate. A specialist program for gifted and talented students called the Selective Extension Program draws students from throughout the district and the Australian Capital Territory. The Karabar marching band, "The Namadgi Redbacks" tours internationally every two years.

The Primary School, Queanbeyan South is over the fence from Karabar High. Queanbeyan South is a public school for pre-school to year 6.
