= Tralee, New South Wales =

Tralee
- Suburb
- Interactive map of Tralee
- Coordinates: 35°25′S 149°10′E
- Country: Australia
- State: New South Wales
- Region: Southern Tablelands
- City: Queanbeyan
- Established: 2012
- Elevation: 610 m (2,000 ft)

Population
  - Total: 0 (SAL 2021)
- Postcode: 2620
Suburbs around Tralee
Macarthur	Hume	Jerrabomberra
Chisolm	Tralee	Environa
Gilmore	Royalla	Environa

Tralee is a suburb in the Queanbeyan–Palerang Regional Council local government area, abutting the border with the Australian Capital Territory and south west of the city of Queanbeyan, New South Wales. It is immediately south of Environa, the site of a city planned during the 1920s that was later sold off as undeveloped land. The suburb is named after Tralee in Ireland.

The residential site, which falls under the flight path of Canberra Airport was strongly opposed by airport authorities. However, despite the concerns, the New South Wales State Planning Minister Kristina Keneally initially approved Queanbeyan City Council's plan for the development of 5000 residential blocks in 2008. In November 2012 the New South Wales Government announced that it had approved the rezoning of the land. Protests have continued by the airport, federal Labor politicians and the ACT Government.

== Geography ==
Tralee lies on the lower slopes of the Pemberton Hill to the south. It is 600–620 m (1,969–2,034 ft) above sea level. The rocks are acid volcanics, rhyodacite and rhyolite from the Deakin Volcanics. These rocks solidified 414±9 Mya.

== Tralee Speedway ==
Between 1970 and 1997, Tralee Speedway was a motorsports venue that hosted a number of Australian Championships. The Speedway sat idle for many years until it was demolished to make way for a regional sports complex, opened when residential development began in the South Jerrabomberra district, including Tralee and surrounds.
