= Pialligo =

- Suburb
- Interactive map of Pialligo
- Coordinates: 35°18′23″S 149°10′48″E
- Country: Australia
- State: Australian Capital Territory
- City: Canberra
- District: Majura
- Location: 8 km (5.0 mi) ESE of Canberra CBD; 10 km (6.2 mi) NW of Queanbeyan; 91 km (57 mi) SW of Goulburn; 288 km (179 mi) SW of Sydney
- Established: 1928

Government
  - Territory electorate: Kurrajong
  - Federal division: Canberra

Area
  - Total: 4.87 km^{2} (1.88 sq mi)
- Elevation: 571 m (1,873 ft)

Population
  - Total: 138 (SAL 2021)
- Postcode: 2609
- Gazetted: 20 September 1928
Suburbs around Pialligo
Campbell	Campbell	Beard
Fyshwick	Pialligo	Beard
Fyshwick	Fyshwick	Queanbeyan

Pialligo (postcode: 2609) (/pɪæləɡoʊ/) is a rural suburb of Canberra, Australian Capital Territory, Australia. The name Pialligo has been used for the area since at least 1820, and is probably of Aboriginal origin. It was also the name for the parish in the area. Streets in Pialligo are named with Aboriginal words.

Beltana Road in Pialligo is home to many of Canberra's nurseries. Canberra Airport is located adjacent to Pialligo across Pialligo Avenue.

== Geology ==
Quaternary alluvium covers the main western part of Pialligo. Calcareous shales from the Canberra Formation are deep underneath. The Woolshed Creek runs into the north end of Pialligo. This is a significant place, because in the bed of the creek the Rev W B Clarke first recognised Silurian fossils. These fossils were brachiopods, mostly Atrypa duntroonensis. He discovered them around 1844 century and it was the first time that Silurian rocks were identified in Australia, and at the time were the oldest known rocks in Australia. This mudstone is from the Canberra Formation.

== Living history ==
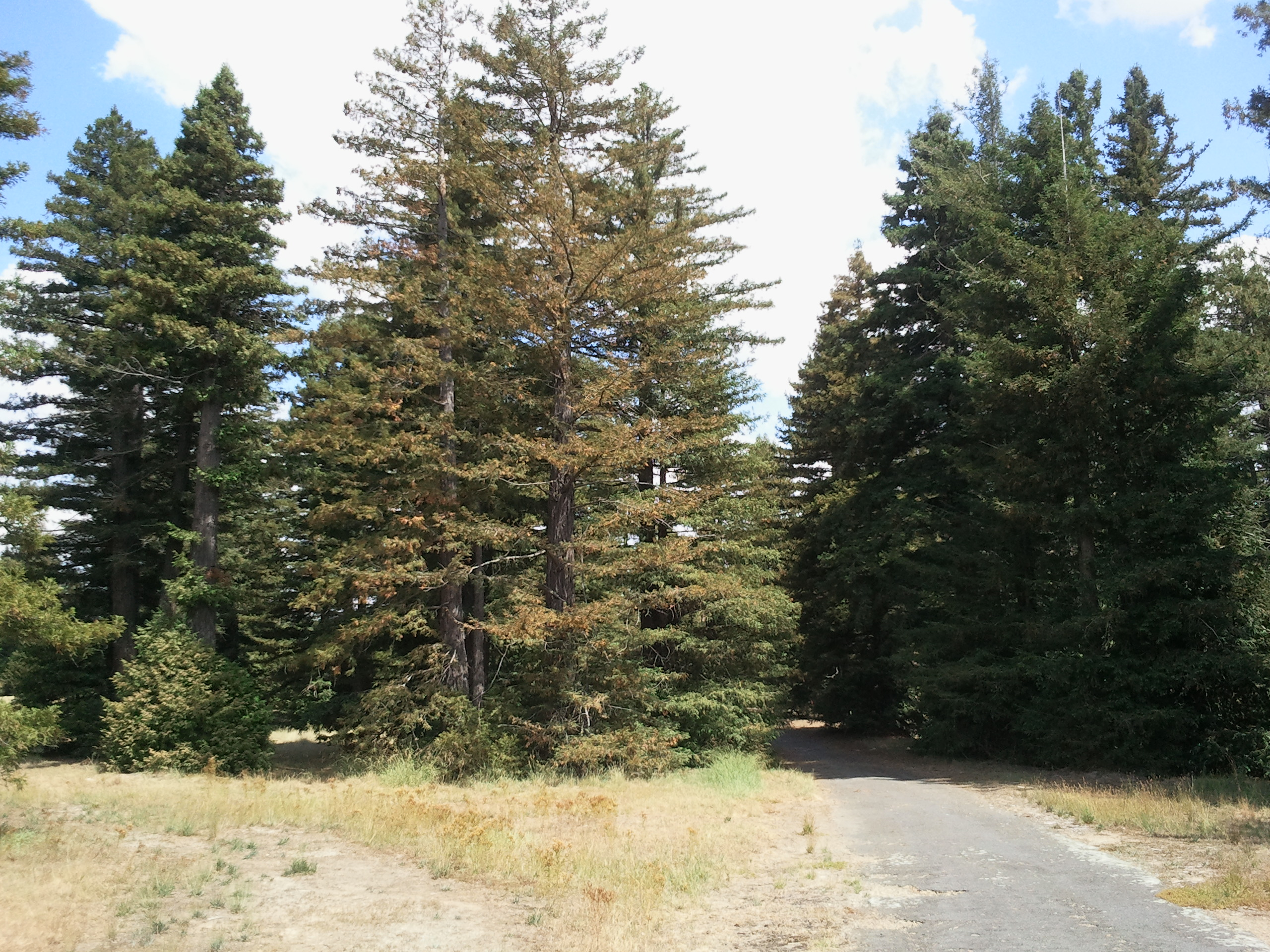
Pialligo Redwood Forest looking south

Aside from the city's design, arguably Walter Burley Griffin's longest-living legacy in Canberra is the forest of Redwood trees (both Sequoia sempervirens and Sequoiadendron giganteum) that was planted in 1918 by Walter Burley Griffin and arborist Thomas Charles Weston in Pialligo.
