= Hume, Australian Capital Territory =

Hume
- Suburb
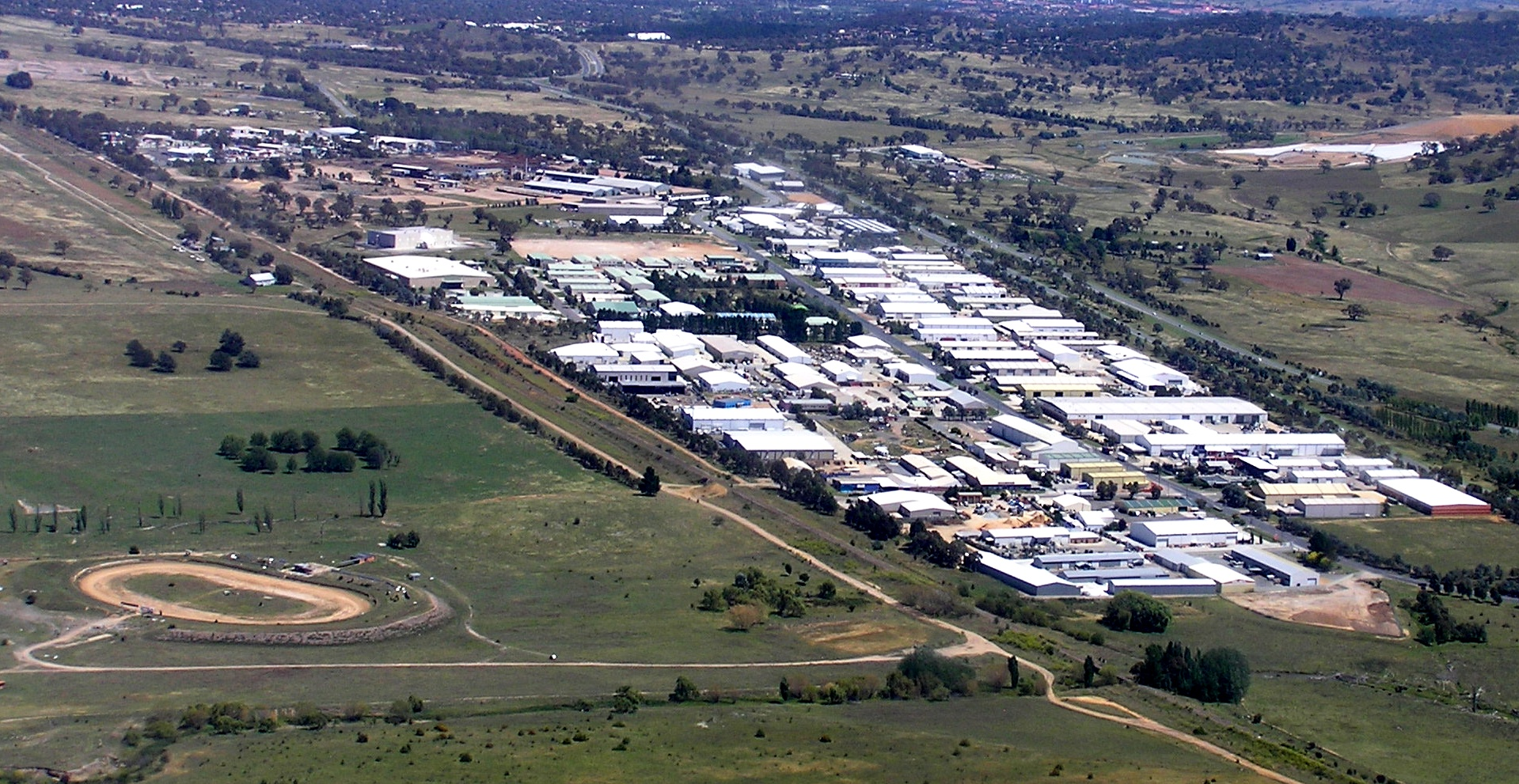
- Aerial view

- Coordinates: 35°23′13″S 149°10′12″E
- Country: Australia
- State: Australian Capital Territory
- City: Canberra
- District: Jerrabomberra
- Location: 15 km (9.3 mi) SSE of Canberra CBD; 10 km (6.2 mi) WSW of Queanbeyan; 100 km (62 mi) SW of Goulburn; 297 km (185 mi) SW of Sydney

Government
  - Territory electorate: Kurrajong
  - Federal division: Bean

Area
  - Total: 8.6 km^{2} (3.3 sq mi)
- Elevation: 595 m (1,952 ft)

Population
  - Total: 395 (2021 census)
  - Density: 45.9/km^{2} (119.0/sq mi)
- Postcode: 2620
- Gazetted: 22 March 1982
Suburbs around Hume
Jerrabomberra (district)	Symonston	Jerrabomberra (NSW)
Jerrabomberra (district)	Hume	Environa (NSW)
Gilmore	Tralee (NSW)	Tralee (NSW)

Hume is a suburb of Canberra, Australia and is adjacent to the District of Jerrabomberra in New South Wales.The suburb is named after the explorer Hamilton Hume and streets are named after Australian industrialists and businessmen. Hume is a light-industrial suburb and there is no significant housing development. At the 2021 census, Hume had a population of 395, up from six in 2006, as a result of the construction of the Alexander Maconochie Centre. The location of the prison has also given Hume a highly unusual gender ratio with 92.7% of the permanent population being male.

== Geology ==
Deakin Volcanics from the Silurian period underlie Hume. Cream and purple rhyodacite are found in the south and including Tralee, New South Wales. A mixture of purple and green tuff, ashstone, shale, and coarse sandstone is in the north east. Coarse dark purple rhyodacite is in the north end near Queanbeyan turn off.

== See also ==
- Mugga Lane Solar Park
