= Symonston =

- Suburb
- Coordinates: 35°20′47″S 149°10′40″E
- Country: Australia
- State: Australian Capital Territory
- City: Canberra
- District: Jerrabomberra
- Location: 10 km (6.2 mi) SSE of Canberra CBD; 8 km (5.0 mi) W of Queanbeyan; 96 km (60 mi) SW of Goulburn; 293 km (182 mi) SW of Sydney
- Established: 1928

Government
  - Territory electorate: Kurrajong
  - Federal divisions: Bean; Canberra

Area
  - Total: 9.90 km^{2} (3.82 sq mi)
- Elevation: 583 m (1,913 ft)

Population
  - Total: 655 (SAL 2021)
- Postcode: 2609
- Gazetted: 20 September 1928
Suburbs around Symonston
Narrabundah	Fyshwick
O'Malley	Symonston	Queanbeyan
	Hume	HMAS Harman

Symonston is a primarily industrial and agricultural suburb of Canberra, Australian Capital Territory, Australia. Symonston is named after Sir Josiah Symon, a legislator, federalist, and one of the original framers of the Australian Constitution.

Located in Symonston are the Periodic Detention Centre and Symonston Temporary Remand Centre and three caravan parks: Canberra South Motor Park, Sundown Village and Narrabundah Longstay Caravan Park. Geoscience Australia has its headquarters in Symonston.

== Planning ==
The Symonston area has traditionally been denoted 'Broadacre' area by the planning authorities, meaning that it has retained a traditionally rural character with some larger institution uses, particularly by the Australian Defence Force and Geoscience Australia. With the release of the Canberra Spatial Plan by the ACT Government, the area and the adjoining Majura Valley has been denoted as an employment corridor centred on Canberra Airport and Fyshwick.

== Geology ==
Rocks in Symonston are from the Silurian age Mount Painter Volcanics dark grey to green grey dacitic tuff underlies most of Symonston. Narrabundah Ashstone Member is found in the northern corner near the motor park. Canberra Formation, calcareous shale found to the east of the ashstone. Further to the east and over to Harman is found the dacitic andesite of the Ainslie Volcanics. An unnamed coarse leucogranite has a small out crop east of Jerrabomberra creek.

Geoscience Australia is the Australian Government organisation tasked with supplying scientific information and knowledge about the geography and geology of Australia. It has information about the geology of the whole of Australia including Canberra.

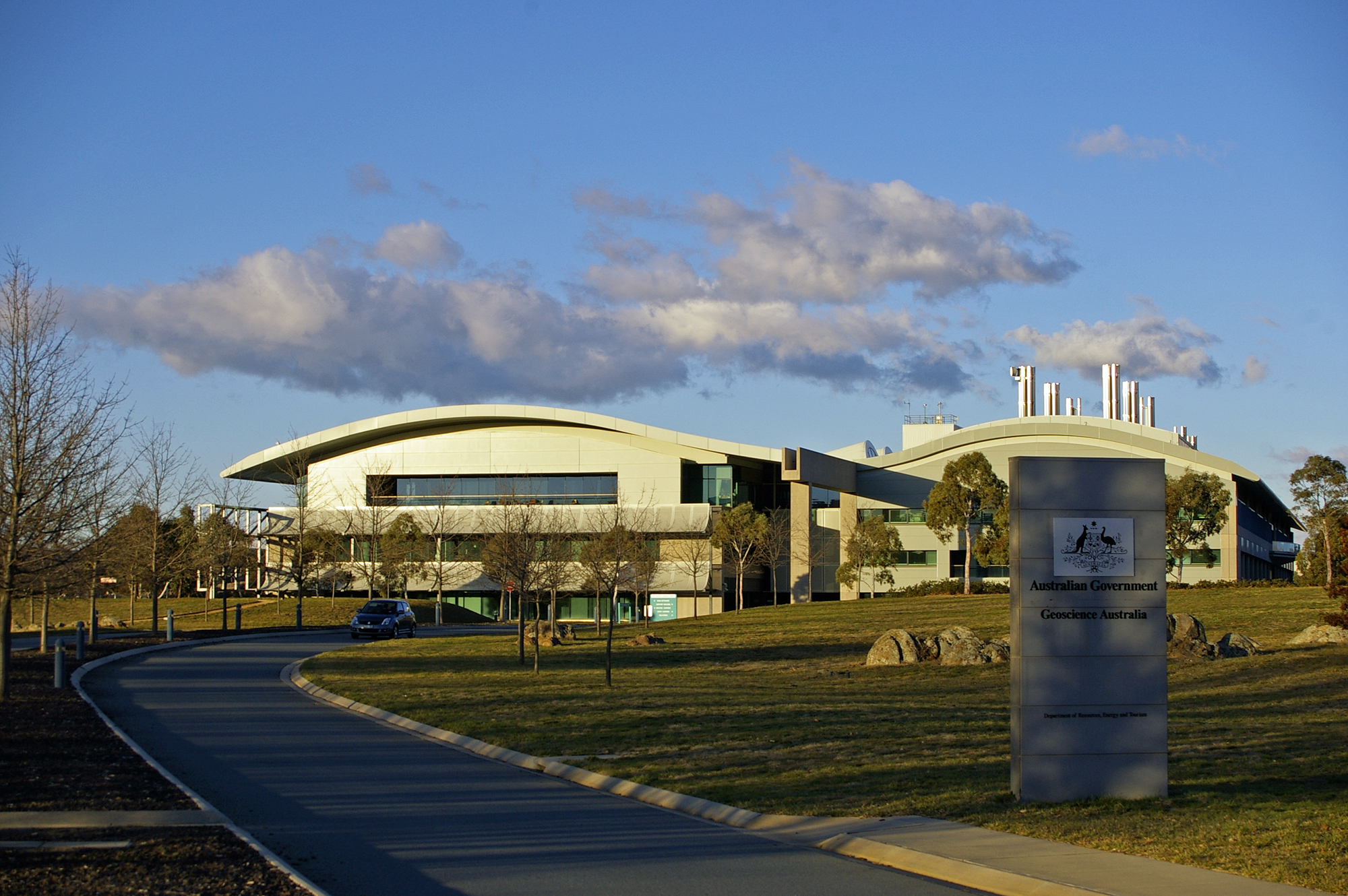
Geoscience Australia in Symonston

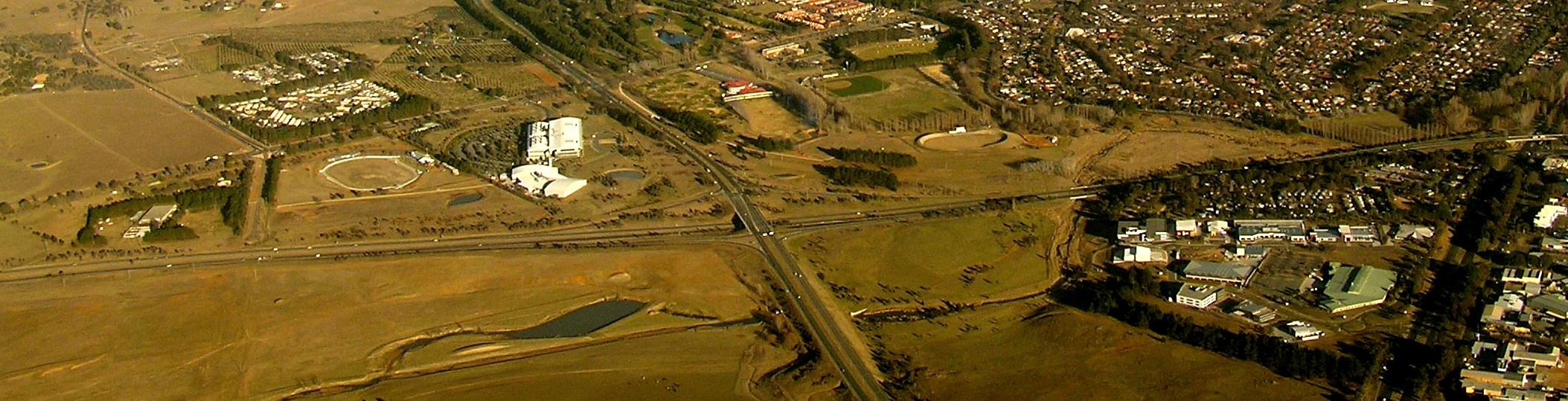
Aerial view from east

== Education ==
Symonston residents get preference for:

- Depending on the address: Forrest Primary or Red Hill Primary
- Telopea Park School (for high school)
- Narrabundah College
