= Jerrabomberra, New South Wales =

- Suburb
- Interactive map of Jerrabomberra, New South Wales
- Coordinates: 35°22′S 149°12′E
- Country: Australia
- State: New South Wales
- LGA: Queanbeyan
- Location: 6 km (3.7 mi) SW of Queanbeyan; 19 km (12 mi) SSE of Canberra; 300 km (190 mi) SW of Sydney
- Established: 1988

Government
  - State electorate: Monaro
  - Federal division: Eden-Monaro
- Elevation: 617 m (2,024 ft)

Population
  - Total: 9,601 (2021 census)
- Postcode: 2619
Suburbs around Jerrabomberra, New South Wales
Harman	Queanbeyan West	Karabar
Hume		Googong
Tralee	Environa	Googong

Jerrabomberra is a suburb of Queanbeyan in south eastern New South Wales, Australia. Jerrabomberra consists of three sections, The Park, The Heights, and Lakeview. The Park and the Heights are divided by Edwin Land Parkway. At the 2021 census, it had 9,601 people, up from 9,508 in 2016, 9,420 in 2011, and 8,747 in 2006. Jerrabomberra is derived from the local Aboriginal place name meaning "boy frightened by storm".

"Jerrabomberra", an area of what was then called the Limestone Plains, was purchased by John Palmer in 1827, and settled the following year. John Palmer had been a purser on the "Sirius" in the First Fleet. The area was brought to his attention because he was a brother-in-law of Robert Campbell at "Duntroon", a property about nine miles (14 km) to the north east. His property served as a centre for the Anglican Church until nearby Queanbeyan (then known by its original Aboriginal, non-Anglicised name Quinbean) was developed. The Palmer family held the property until at least the 1890s, but the property was later sub-divided into smaller farms.

In 1987, Jerrabomberra Estates Ltd, with the CEO Director Alex Brinkmeyer, whose sole vision was to create a master planned community for the region, invited Canberra-based accountant Col Alexander and Perth Millionaire Kerry Stokes, who subsequently became shareholders, to partake in this venture to develop Palmer's original land for housing. The first serviced blocks in stage one of the residential release at Jerrabomberra were released in February 1988, ranging in price from $28,000 to $39,000. The new suburb of Jerrabomberra has grown from a resident population of 8 in 1828 to over 8740 at the 2006 census. Jerrabomberra was established with the construction of the first homes in 1988, followed shortly after by the construction of the community centre hall. Jerrabomberra now boasts many community amenities such as four tennis courts, a post office, primary school, bed and breakfast, gym, a Scout group, a lake and various other facilities. Many people in Jerrabomberra work in nearby Queanbeyan but most work in the national capital, Canberra.

The suburb falls within the Federal division of Eden-Monaro, a seat traditionally viewed as a "bellwether seat" due to its propensity for being won by the party that also won the majority of seats. However, the seat was won by Mike Kelly (Labor) in 2016 in an election narrowly won by the Liberal Party. Following Kelly's resignation, Eden-Monaro was held by Kristy McBain (Labor) at a 2020 by-election and again at the 2022 general election. Jerrabomberra is also part of the state seat of Monaro which is held by the Labor Party's Steve Whan. Jerrabomberra is also represented by an active residents association (JRA) established in October 1990. The Jerrabomberra Residents Association Inc. (JRA) endeavours to represent the interests of the Jerrabomberra community at the local, state and federal level in relation to issues directly affecting the Jerrabomberra community.

== Geographical Aspects ==
The Heights is mainly situated on the base of Jerrabomberra Mountain. This mountain divides most of Jerrabomberra from Queanbeyan on the north-east and North Terrace on the north-west. The Park is situated on the plain to the south. This urban area runs down to Jerrabomberra Lake, an artificial lake that drains into Jerrabomberra Creek and is dominated by Cove Island, est. 1992 (an artificial island which consists of eight homes and a central common facility entailing a tennis court, swimming pool and sauna), then sprawls across Cassina Rise on the South.

== Population ==
At the 2021 census of Population, there were 9,601 people in Jerrabomberra.

- Aboriginal and Torres Strait Islander people made up 1.8% of the population.
- 80.5% of people were born in Australia. The next most common countries of birth were England 3.0% and India and New Zealand 1.3% each.
- 85.0% of people spoke only English at home. Other languages spoken at home included Macedonian 1.5%, Italian 1.1%.
- The most common responses for religion were No Religion 36.8%, Catholic 27.8% and Anglican 13.0%.

== Education and Childcare ==
Jerrabomberra Public School opened in 2002 and now caters for over 800 students K-6. Achieving results above the State average across the curriculum with particular strengths in literacy and numeracy the school is highly regarded and continues to undergo a building expansion program. Jerrabomberra High School opened in 2024.
