= Oaks Estate, Australian Capital Territory =

Oaks Estate
- Town
- Coordinates: 35°20′25″S 149°13′46″E
- Country: Australia
- State: Australian Capital Territory
- District: Jerrabomberra
- Location: 15 km (9.3 mi) SE of Canberra; 1 km (0.62 mi) N of Queanbeyan; 287 km (178 mi) SW of Sydney
- Established: 1984

Government
  - Territory electorate: Kurrajong
  - Federal division: Canberra
- Elevation: 583 m (1,913 ft)

Population
  - Total: 375 (SAL 2021)
- Postcode: 2620
Localities around Oaks Estate
Oaks Estate	Queanbeyan
Queanbeyan	Queanbeyan

Oaks Estate is a village in the district of Jerrabomberra, in the Australian Capital Territory in Australia. It is situated on the northern side of the Australian Capital Territory and New South Wales border abutting the town of Queanbeyan in south-eastern New South Wales, Australia. The estate covers an area of approximately 40 hectares and is bound by the Molonglo River to the north, the Queanbeyan River to the east, 'The Oaks' to the west, and the Queanbeyan-Cooma railway to the south. Oaks Estate is located 12 kilometres from the centre of Canberra. The village is also noteworthy as the nucleus of Queanbeyan's industrial development during the second half of the 19th century. Oaks Estate takes its name from 'The Oaks', which was part of Duntroon, Robert Campbell's farming estate. This makes Oaks Estate one of only a few place names in the ACT with significant connections to early colonial times.

== History ==
=== Colonial ===
Timothy Beard, a pardoned convict and former innkeeper from Campbelltown in New South Wales was the first European to occupy the area. In the mid-1820s he drove cattle from Liverpool to graze near the junction of the Molonglo and Queanbeyan Rivers. His station huts which he named 'Queenbeeann’were located two kilometres downstream from the Molonglo/Queanbeyan River junction in what is today the abattoir paddock. The town of Queanbeyan was established in 1838 about 2 kilometres (1.2 mi) south east of Oaks Estate.

In 1877 John Bull, a farmer and grazier from Tarago NSW purchased from Charles Campbell, the son of Robert, 100 acres of land including the building known as 'The Oaks'. He operated the inn as the 'Elmsall Inn'. In the same year John Bull established Hazelbrook Works, a wool washing works and fellmonger near the junction of the Queanbeyan and Molonglo rivers.

In 1885 George Tompsitt bought Hazelbrook Works and renamed it the Hazelbrook Wool Scouring Works, Tannery and Wholesale Produce Warehouses. With a major business expansion Oaks Estate became the nucleus of Queanbeyan industry. The Queanbeyan Railway Station opened in September 1887 and the auction of the sale of the first residential allotments in Oaks Estate took place a few months later. In the early 1890s a local businessman established the Queanbeyan Roller Flour Mill in the Oaks Estate.

=== After federation ===
Two years after the passing of the Seat of Government Acceptance Act 1909, the Federal Capital Territory was brought into existence on 1 January 1911. The Goulburn-Cooma railway line was prescribed as the eastern territorial boundary, Oaks Estate was excised from Queanbeyan by the federal Act of Parliament and a 20-metre long railway bridge. The Queanbeyan railway station is located on the southern side of the tracks adjacent to Oaks Estate and a road bridge links Oaks Estate to Queanbeyan.

The Oaks burial ground was Queanbeyan's first cemetery established in 1838 until the Riverside cemetery was opened in 1846. The existence of Queanbeyan's earliest burial site was lost to time until 1991 when old human remains were unearthed. The earthly remains of more than 40 Queanbeyan settlers are buried there.

== Place names ==
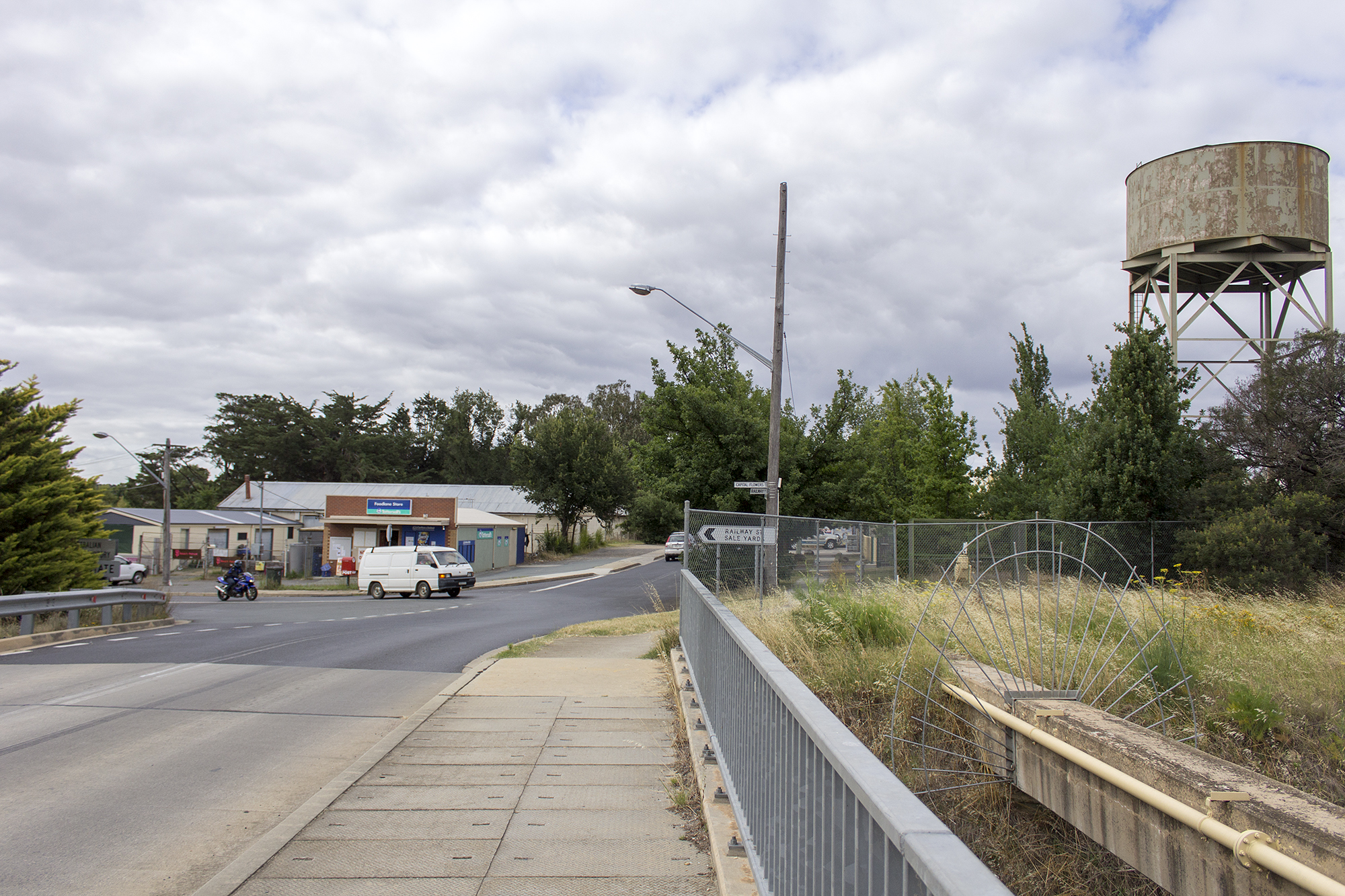
McEwan Avenue

The street names in Oaks Estate village mark the name of some significant historic figures in its development over the past 150 years.

Street name	Probable origin
Florence Street	Florence Bull was John Bull’s daughter
Railway Street	Proximity of street to the railway easement
George Street	George Tompsitt purchased a portion of John Bull’s land which included 'The Oaks' and the wool washing works and fellmongery
Hazel Street	Hazelbrook Works was a wool washing and fellmongering industry established in 1877 by John Bull and purchased by George Tompsitt in 1885.
Hill Street	Road name in use for many years
McEwen Avenue	Former Prime Minister and Minister for the Interior, John McEwen was instrumental in extending Canberra's water supply to Oakes Estate. The water tank is located at the end of this road
River Street	The road leads to the Molonglo River
William Street	In 1885 William Price, a Sydney merchant, purchased the remaining portion of John Bull’s land

== Amenities ==
Oaks Estate has a population of about 330. The village supports a mixture of industrial and commercial uses in storage, warehousing, light metal fabrication, liquor storage and retailing as well as some ACT Government public housing.

Located there is:

- Abattoir
- Allotment garden
- Antiques restoration workshop
- Council city nursery
- Electricity substation
- Horse holding paddocks
- Liquor store
- Saleyards
- Sportsground
- Tannery
- Water pollution control centre

== Education ==
Oaks Estate residents get preference for:

- A shared Priority Enrollment Area (PEA) of Forrest Primary and Red Hill Primary
- Telopea Park School (for high school)
- Narrabundah College

== Geology ==
Under Oaks Estate are rocks from the Pittman formation. These are from the Ordovician period and consist of chert, phyllite and quartz rich micaceous sandstone. This area of the ACT is structurally on the Cullarin Horst, an uplifted area. A small patch of black Acton Shale is in the south east end of the settlement.
