= HMAS Harman =

Royal Australian Navy base

- Harman, Canberra, Australian Capital Territory in Australia
- HMAS Harman

- Ship's badge of HMAS Harman

Site information
- Type: Naval base / stone frigate
- Owner: Department of Defence
- Operator: Royal Australian Navy (1943 – 1967); Royal Australian Navy (1967 – present)
- Website: navy.gov.au/establishments/hmas-harman

Location
- Location in the Australian Capital Territory
- Coordinates: 35°20′48″S 149°12′4″E
- Area: 2.5 square kilometres (0.97 sq mi)

Site history
- Built: 1943
- In use: 1943 – present

Garrison information
- Current commander: Commander Amanda Howard, RAN
- Occupants: Defence Communications Area Master Station Australia (DEFCAMSAUS); Defence Communications Station (DEFCOMMSTA) Canberra; 28 Squadron, Royal Australian Air Force; Australian Army Reserve; Australian Navy Cadets, TS Canberra

HMAS Harman is a Royal Australian Navy (RAN) base that serves as a communications and logistics facility. The main base is located in the Australian capital of Canberra, and is geographically recognised as the suburb of Harman (postcode 2600) in the District of Jerrabomberra. Established in the late 1930s as the Royal Australian Navy Wireless/Transmitting Station Canberra, the facility was commissioned into the RAN as a stone frigate in 1943. In addition to its communications and logistics roles, the base hosts reserve units from both the Australian Army Reserves and Royal Australian Air Force Reserves, as well as cadet units from all three branches of the Australian Defence Force Cadets.

The base is also reported to be a major contributor to the U.S. National Security Agency's XKeyscore surveillance program.

As of December 2024, the commander of the base is Commander Glyn Hunter.

== History ==
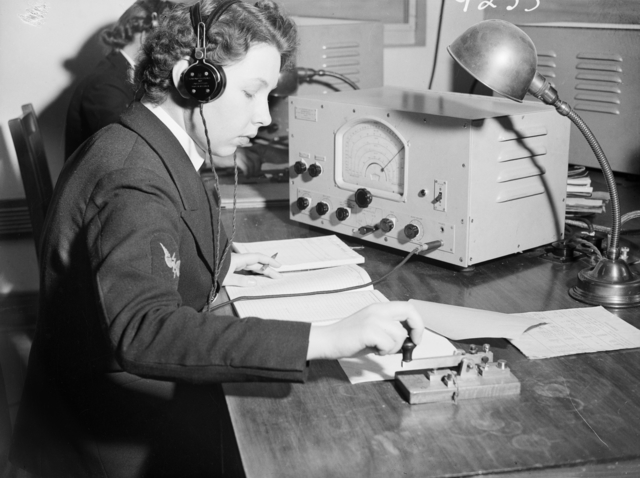
A member of the Women's Royal Australian Naval Service at HMAS Harman in 1941; the first unit where women served as part of the RAN.

In 1924, the Imperial Defence Committee's Communications Sub-Committee examined Australian coastal radio stations, and recommended the modernisation of the stations at Darwin, Perth, Rabaul, and Townsville. A year later, the Australian Commonwealth Naval Board (ACNB) made a recommendation that two wireless stations be provided for the Navy in Canberra and Darwin. These would be strategic stations in addition to the coastal stations. Canberra was chosen as its distance from the coast would increase its protection from attack. Planning continued in 1935, where a new Canberra station would add to the coverage area of Rugby, and function as a fall back in the event of the destruction of submarine cables, or the Hong Kong or Singapore wireless telegraphy stations. The Australian government decided to build a receiving and a transmitting station in Canberra in 1937, with the transmitting station sited at Ginninderra Creek in Belconnen, approximately 20 kilometres (12 mi) north-west of the main receiving facility.

Construction of the transmission facility (Royal Australian Navy Wireless/Transmitting Station Canberra) commenced in November 1938. The facility established on 20 April 1939 and started transmitting on 22 December 1939. Work on the main facility started in early 1939, with the facility registered with the Postmaster General's Department on 20 July 1939 under the name 'Harman'. The name was derived from the surnames of the two officers responsible for naming the new naval stations: Commander Neville Harvey of the Royal Navy, and RAN Lieutenant Commander Jack Bolton Newman. As the ACNB had paid little attention to the proposals for the names of previous wireless stations before implementing them, the two men proposed their combined names for the Canberra facility, which was accepted without comment.

World War II commenced before the station was completed. Newman was promoted to Commander and assigned to command the Harman facility from when it opened until 1941, when he was replaced as Officer-in-Charge. The station was commissioned into the RAN as the stone frigate HMAS Harman on 1 July 1943. Harman provided radio coverage of the Pacific Ocean during the war, and provided communications intercepts for the FRUMEL signals intelligence unit. Women of the Women's Royal Australian Naval Service (WRANS), formed in 1941, operated the equipment.

== Facilities and functions ==
In addition to its communications role, Harman provides Navy administrative and logistic functions to all Navy personnel located in the Australian Capital Territory and southern New South Wales. The base also includes a tri-service "Multi-User Depot". This depot hosts reserve units from the Australian Army and Royal Australian Air Force, and cadet units of the Australian Navy Cadets, Australian Army Cadets, and Australian Air Force Cadets.

=== Harman ===
Initially, the facilities at Harman included Number One Receiving Station, which became the Communications Centre, an aerial farm behind the building, a direction finding hut located 1.2 kilometres (0.75 mi) away on a ridge, cottages and guard houses. Later, Number Two Receiving station was built for 'special tasks', a recreation hall was opened 27 April 1941, and a mess hall was finished around the end of 1940. In 1943, a second mess was built. The Morgan Dunbar Oval and Sir Victor Smith Oval are located in Harman. There are also tennis courts and a gymnasium. The base covers an area of 2.5 square kilometres (0.97 sq mi). 970 people work at Harman.

Functions performed at Harman include:

- Defence Communications Area Master Station Australia (DEFCAMSAUS); supporting ADF Communications Elements
- Defence Communications Station Canberra (DEFCOMMSTA Canberra); provides UHF Military Satellite Communications and HF Radio Communications for the Australian Defence Force
- Defence Network Operations Centre (DNOC)
- Two units of the Army Reserve
- Administrative and Personnel support for Navy Members in the Canberra Region
- No. 28 Squadron, Royal Australian Air Force

On 11 July 2013, ex-CIA contractor Edward Snowden revealed documents that alleged Harman, amongst three other locations in Australia and one in New Zealand, were amongst those used in the PRISM surveillance program conducted by various United States intelligence agencies. The Defence Network Operations Centre (DNOC) is the hub of the third largest communications network in Australia after Telstra and Optus. The DNOC provides network support for military operations throughout the Australian Defence Force. During 2012 and 2013 it was reported that the expansion of communication facilities at Harman had resulted in budget cost overruns in excess of the original budget of A$90 million. A revised estimate of A$163 million was projected; together with significantly more data than was originally estimated.

=== Bonshaw Receiving Station ===
About 2.5 kilometres (1.6 mi) southwest of the main complex was the Bonshaw Receiving Station, in which watchkeepers listened for messages from ships on the high frequency (HF) bands. This area was designated as a radio quiet zone.

=== Belconnen Naval Transmitting Station ===
About 20 kilometres (12 mi) north-west of Harman, the Belconnen Naval Transmitting Station was a sub-unit that maintained the corresponding HF and low frequency (LF) transmitting equipment, including the three 600 feet (180 m) masts for the 250kW, 44kHz transmitter. The station was equipped with 40kW and 10kW HF transmitters that used a variety of antennas including rhombic, vertical monopole, and log-periodic antennas. The station was initially built with small cottages flanking the eastern side of the site, housing the electrical engineer-in-charge and the sailors who maintained the transmitters and antennas. These were removed in the late 1980s, although the mess building remained, with personnel moving into housing in the growing suburbs that gradually encroached on the site. The station ended transmissions on 1 June 2005, and the remaining structures on the site were demolished in December 2006 to allow for residential development on the site, forming the new suburb of Lawson.

== Education ==
Harman residents get preference for a shared Priority Enrollment Area (PEA) of Forrest Primary and Red Hill Primary, Telopea Park School for high school, and the Narrabundah College.

== See also ==
- List of Royal Australian Navy bases
