= Energy in the Australian Capital Territory =

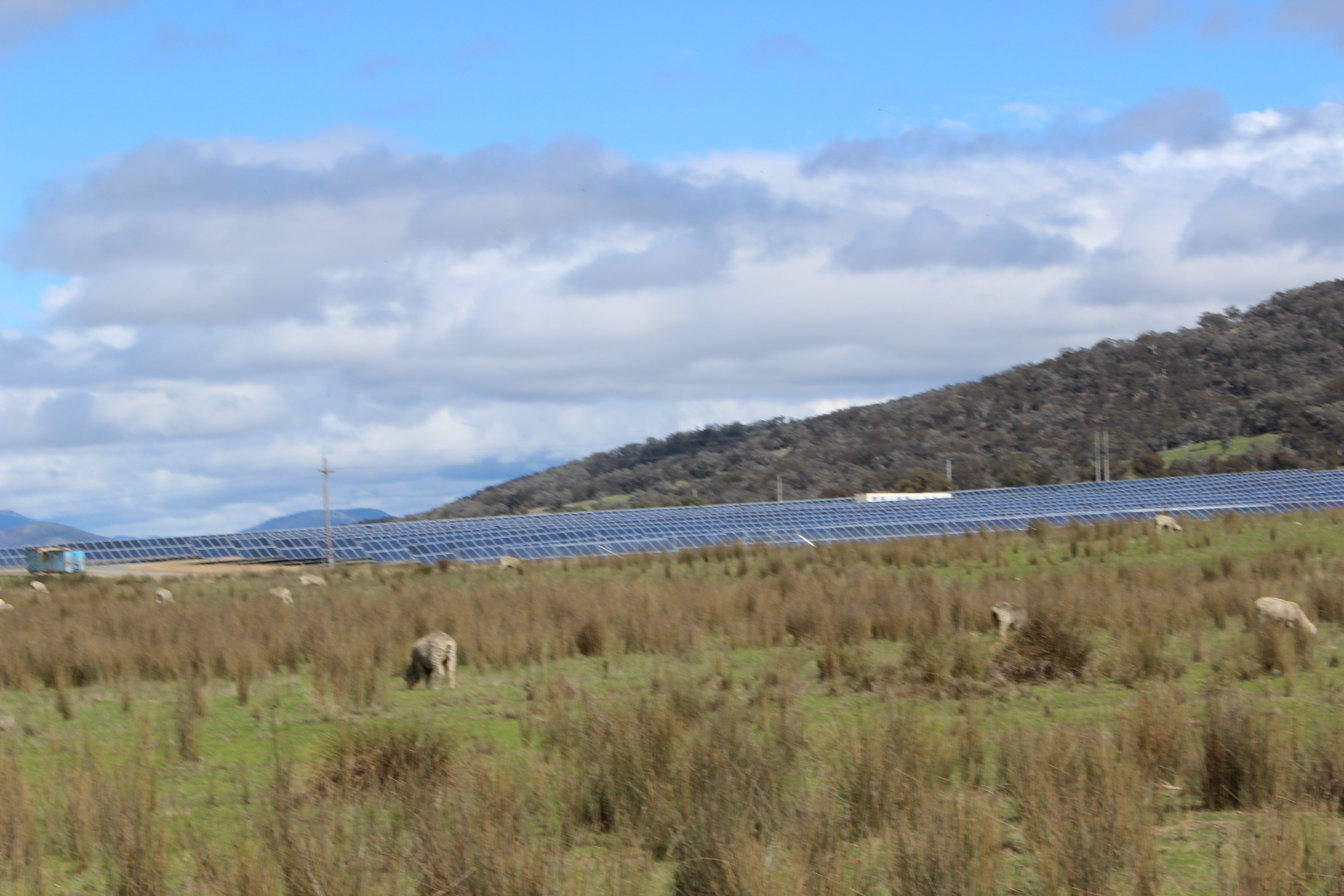
Royalla Solar Farm

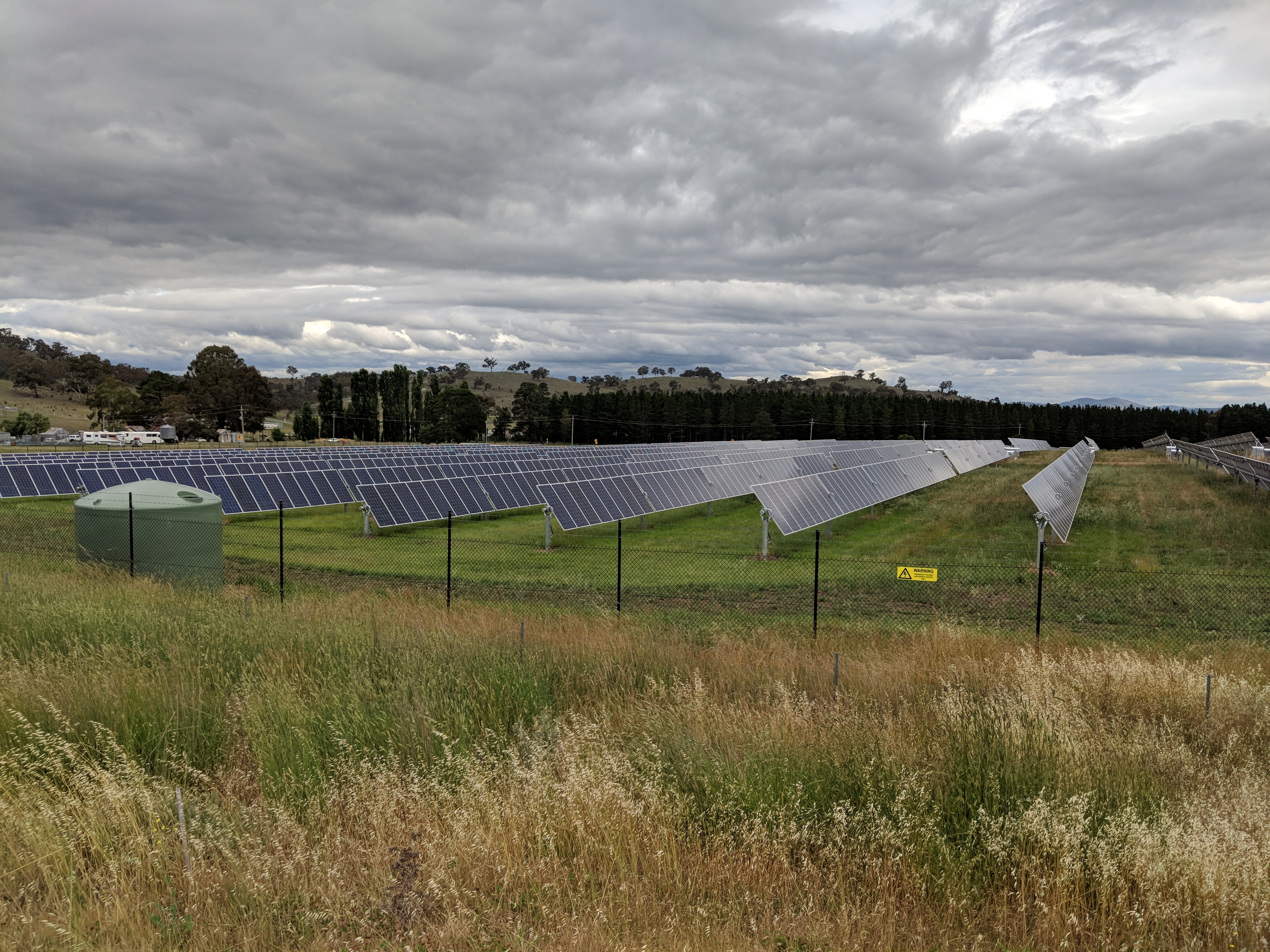
Mount Majura solar farm

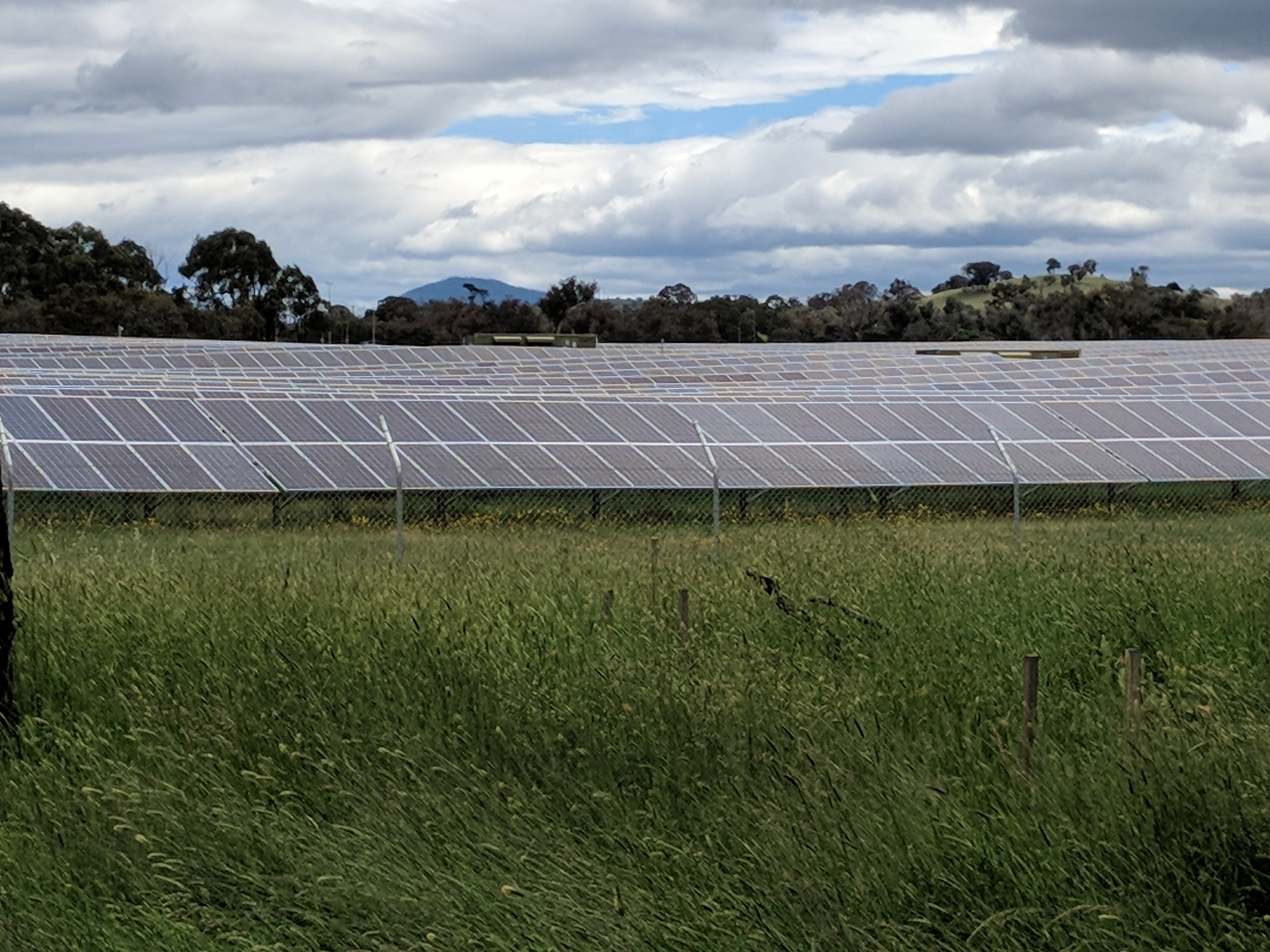
Mugga Lane Solar Park

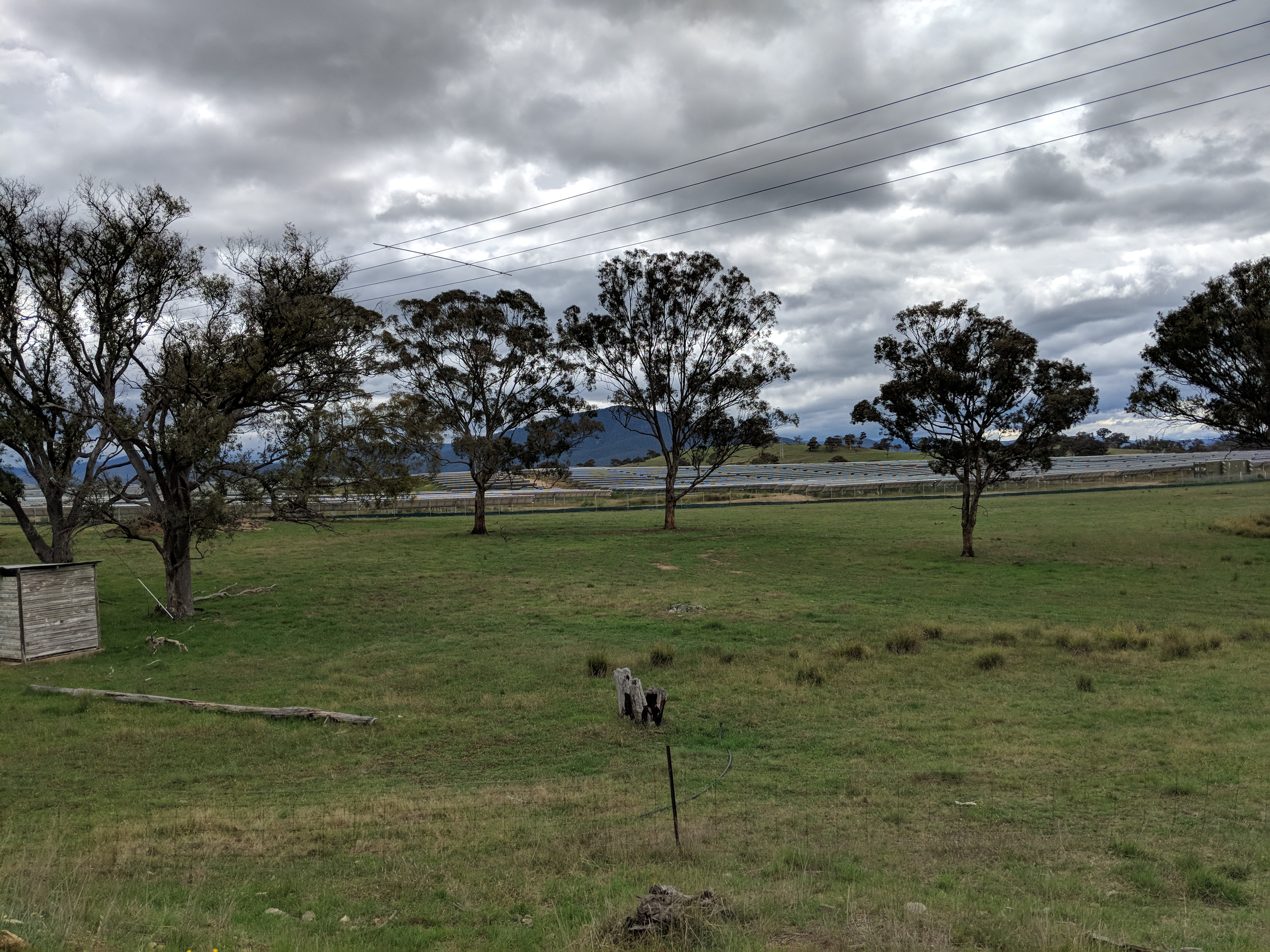
Willamsdale solar farm

Energy produced in the Australian Capital Territory mainly consists of solar electricity. Electricity consumed in the Australian Capital Territory mainly comes from the national power grid through substations at Holt and Fyshwick (via Queanbeyan). The ACT currently mandates that 100 percent of its electricity, will be supplied from renewable sources by 2020. The ACT has five solar farms capable of generating about 56.3 megawatts. From 1913 until the mid 1950s some power was produced from the Kingston Powerhouse, a thermal power station in Kingston.

When its renewable sources are insufficient the ACT receives reserve power from suppliers in NSW, including from non renewable sources. Conversely, when the ACT’s renewable generation exceeds usage in the ACT, renewably-sourced electricity is supplied to the Australian electricity grid for consumption in other states.

== Renewable power supply targets ==
The Government of the Australian Capital Territory announced in 2013 that under the ACT's Electricity Feed in (Large Scale Renewable Energy Generation) Act, the ACT would mandate that 90 percent of its electricity would be supplied from renewable sources by 2020. This will raise the target from 210 to 550 megawatts. It announced in February 2015 that three wind farms in Victoria and South Australia would supply 200 megawatts of capacity; these are expected to be operational by 2017. They are Ararat Wind Farm (80.5 MW, $87.00/MWh), Coonooer Bridge Wind Farm (19.4 MW, $81.50/MWh) and Hornsdale Wind Farm (100 MW, $92.00/MWh). Contracts for the purchase of an additional 200 megawatts of power from two wind farms in South Australia and New South Wales were announced in December 2015 and March 2016. These were Hornsdale Wind Farm (100 MW, $77.00/MWh) and Sapphire Wind Farm (100 MW, $89.10/MWh). The Government of the Australian Capital Territory announced in 2014 that up to 23 megawatts of feed-in-tariff entitlements would be made available for the establishment of a facility in the ACT or surrounding region for burning household and business waste to produce electricity by 2020.

== Solar power ==
The ACT has five major solar farms with a total rated capacity of 56.3 megawatts, which were opened between 2014 and 2021.

The Royalla Solar Farm is rated at 20 megawatts and was described at its opening as the largest photovoltaic solar farm in Australia. It was officially opened at Royalla on 3 September 2014. The plant features 82,000 solar panels, installed on 41 kilometers of fixed structures. It was developed by the Spanish company Fotowatio Renewable Ventures (FRV).

The Mount Majura Solar Farm was opened in Majura on 6 October 2016. It is rated at 2.3 megawatt and is owned and operated by the Impact Investment Group.

The Majura Community Energy Project was opened in April 2021. It is a 1.2 megawatt facility, owned by SolarShare Community Energy Ltd. Set on a 3-hectare property, the solar farm features 4,200 bi-facial solar modules, producing enough power for up to 260 ACT homes each year. SolarShare raised $2.54 million from approximately 350 local ACT investors to fund the project.

The Mugga Lane Solar Park at Mugga Lane, Hume is owned by the Maoneng Group, which has been contracted by the Government of the Australian Capital Territory to produce up to 24,600 megawatt hours each year for up to $4.38 million. It has a rated output of 13 megawatts and contains 53,000 solar PV panels. It was completed in March 2017.

The Williamsdale Solar Farm is an 11 megawatt solar farm at Williamsdale. It uses a single axis sun-tracking system and is owned by Impact Investment Group. Construction was completed on in October 2017. This was originally planned to be built at Uriarra but faced local opposition.

In addition numerous houses in Canberra have photovoltaic panels and/or solar hot water systems. Power produced by rooftop panels in 2015–16 is set out below. Note that the power produced by retail supported systems was only included if it was fed back into the grid. Power consumed locally was not recorded.

Rooftop solar power capacity in the ACT in 2015–16
	Feed-in tariff supported	Retailer supported	Total
No of Generators	10,304	7,406	17,710
Installed capacity (MW)	26.3	25.2	51.5
Production (MWh)	34,910	28,815	63,725

== Thermal Power ==
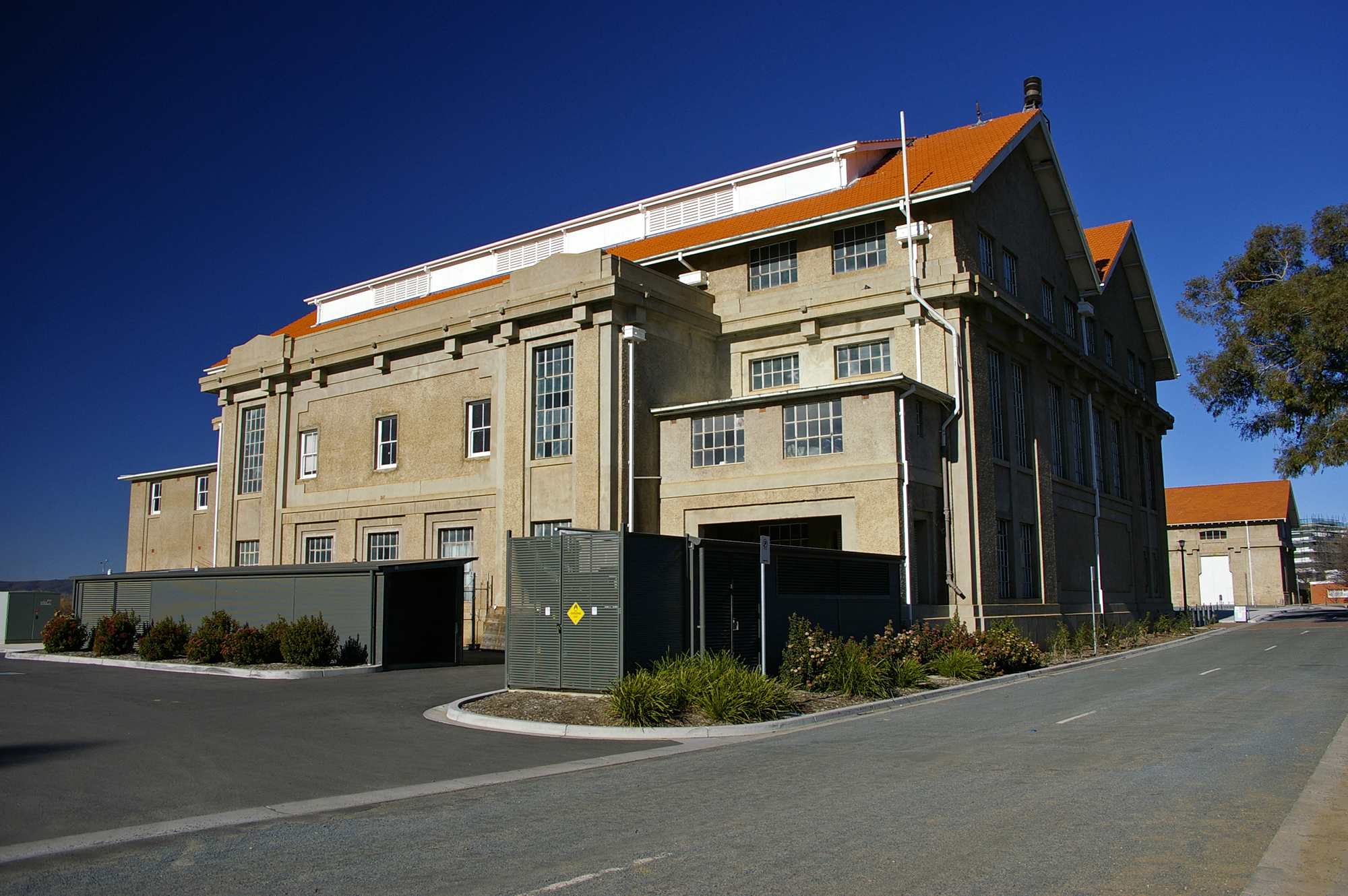
Kingston Powerhouse

Power was first supplied from a thermal plant built in 1913, near the Molonglo River, but this was finally closed in 1957. This was built as a coal-fired thermal power station, but an additional oil fired-generator was also installed at the same site in the post-war period.

== Other sources of electricity ==
Some limited local renewable power is produced via a hydro generator on the main water supply pipeline for Canberra at Mount Stromlo and methane plants at waste landfill sites at Belconnen and Mugga Lane. There are currently no wind-power generators in Canberra, but several have been built in nearby New South Wales, such as the 140.7 megawatt Capital Wind Farm.
