= Googong =

- Suburb
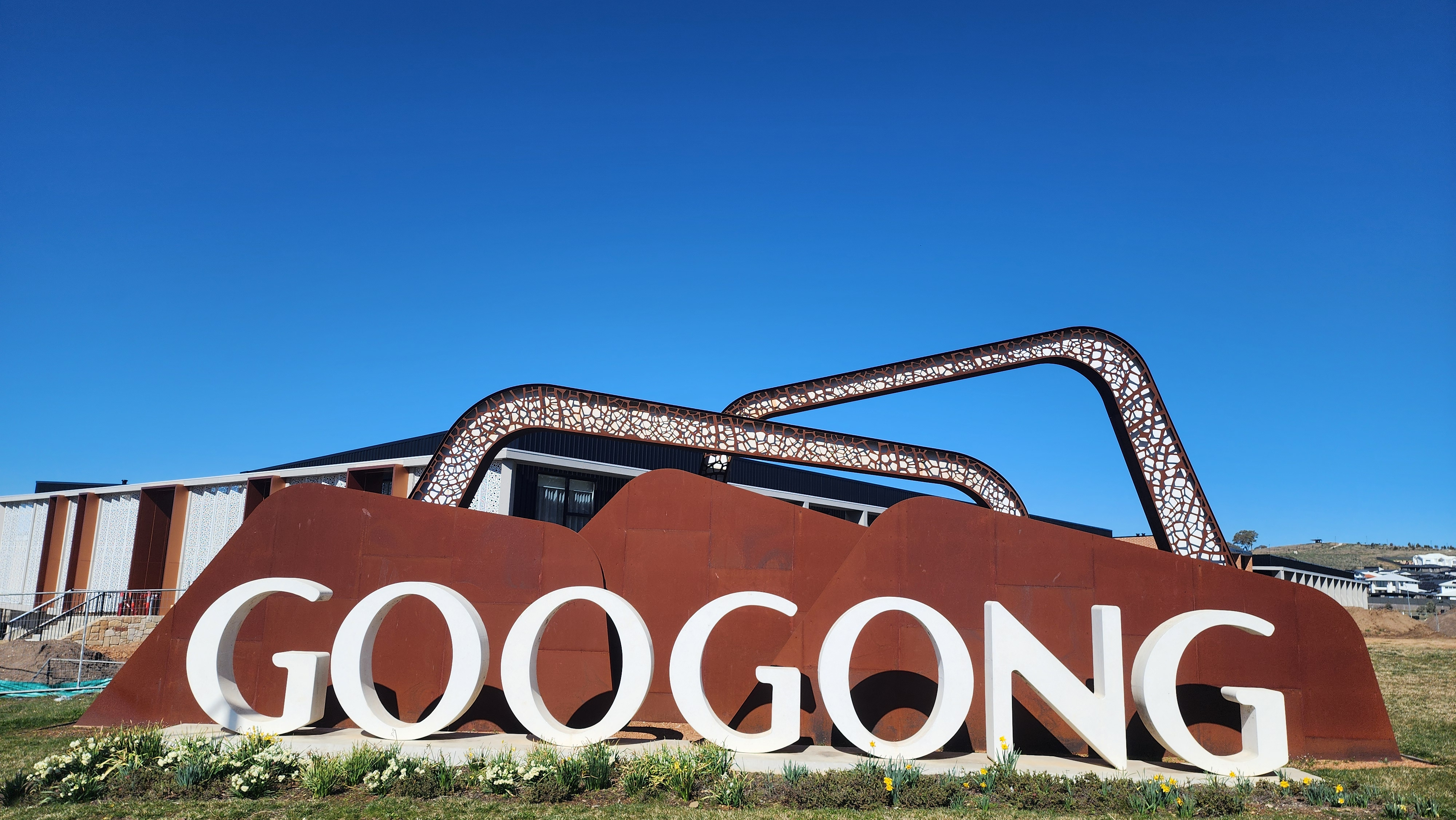

- Interactive map of Googong
- Coordinates: 35°42′S 149°22′E
- Country: Australia
- State: New South Wales
- City: Queanbeyan
- LGA: Queanbeyan–Palerang Regional Council
- Location: 10 km (6.2 mi) S of Queanbeyan; 27 km (17 mi) SE of Canberra; 298 km (185 mi) SW of Sydney

Government
  - State electorate: Monaro
  - Federal division: Eden-Monaro
- Elevation: 746 m (2,448 ft)

Population
  - Total: 7,444 (2021 census)
- County: Murray
- Parish: Googong
Suburbs around Googong
Jerrabomberra	Karabar	Carwoola
Tralee; Environa	Googong	Yarrow
Royalla	Burra	Yarrow, New South Wales

Googong is a town located within the Queanbeyan–Palerang Regional Council government area, south of the Queanbeyan Central Business District (CBD).

The Googong area incorporates the township of Googong, and the developed areas of Fernleigh Park, Little Burra and Mount Campbell Estate. It borders Jerrabomberra and Karabar to the north and Environa to the west. It is about 10 kilometres south of the Queanbeyan central business district. Its citizens tend to use the infrastructure of the neighboring city of Canberra, about 15 kilometres to the north-west.

== History ==
Googong is situated on the country of the traditional owners, the Ngunnawal Aboriginal people, and five Aboriginal groups have identified custodial connections to the area. European farmers and settlers began occupying the environs of Googong in the mid-19th century, which was named after one of the largest properties in the area. However, the meaning and origin of the word "Googong" is obscure.

The first part of the original stone homestead was built in 1845 and was occupied by Alexander McDonald, an employee of the Campbell family, who were early European settlers of the Canberra region. The homestead was later renamed "Beltana". The area around Googong has several historic features including the old London Bridge Homestead and the London Bridge Arch, a remarkable natural limestone bridge formed over thousands of years by Burra Creek. The nearby Googong Dam, fed by the Queanbeyan River and numerous creeks, is by far the largest in the ACT region. It was completed in 1979.

The township of Googong occupies an area of 780 hectares which sits within the Parish of Googong, an area of land between Burra and Queanbeyan, east of Jerrabomberra Creek. It is being developed as a joint venture between Peet Limited and Mirvac, and will eventually be home to around 18,000 people. Googong Foreshores is the name given to the area around Googong Dam, which is separate from the town of Googong and is managed as a water catchment, wildlife refuge, and public recreation area. Park Care volunteers help to protect the national and cultural values of the Foreshores.

Planning for the township of Googong began in the early 2000s, with approval to begin the re-zoning process granted in 2006. The findings of the Independent Queanbeyan Land Release Inquiry, issued by the NSW Minister for Planning in September of that year, recommended the site as the future residential growth area for the City of Queanbeyan. In November 2007, the NSW Department of Planning issued a Section 65 certificate enabling the public exhibition of the draft Local Environmental Plan which was available for public comment until February 2008. The re-zoning of the site to allow residential development was approved in December 2009.

At that time it was announced that Googong would have five neighbourhoods, a town centre and four local shopping centres, as well as 183 hectares of open space to provide recreational, ecological and visual amenity. As part of the project, developers Peet and Mirvac undertook a Voluntary Planning Agreement (now known as a Local Planning Agreement) to dedicate land and undertake construction works valued at over $300 million. They included road and intersection upgrades on local access roads and the construction of community facilities including a library, community centres, indoor pool and sports centre, sporting fields and open spaces, as well as gifting land for a public primary school, public secondary school, and fire station. The Development Control Plan for the township of Googong was approved by Queanbeyan City Council in October 2010. The final plan was formally adopted in June 2013. Civil construction commenced at Googong in 2012 with the first residents moving in during February 2014.

== Culture and arts ==
=== Googfest ===
Googfest is a regional music festival hosted by the developers of Googong, Peet Limited and Mirvac. The festival was launched in 2015 and has previously featured music acts including Dami Im, SAFIA, Sneaky Sound System, The Aston Shuffle, Joe Camilleri and The Black Sorrows, and Travis Collins attracting more than 10,000 people each year.

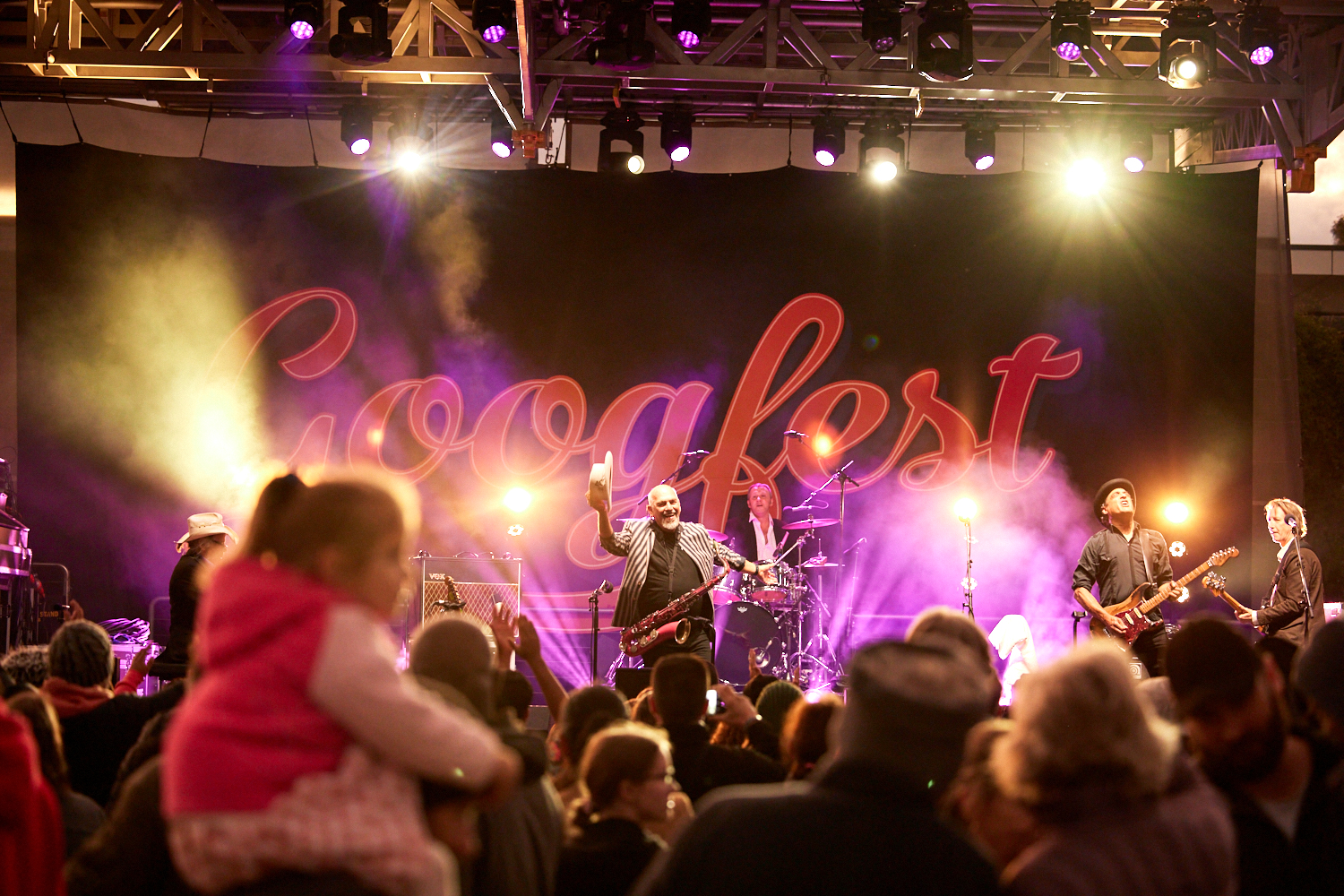
Googfest 2023

=== Rural Fire Service Open Day ===
The Googong Rural Fire Service Open Day offers members of the community the chance to meet local crew from the Jerrabomberra Creek Rural Fire Brigade and the Queanbeyan Fire and Rescue service to discuss fire safety in the region and at home. The open day also features local Landcare, sports groups and wildlife careers and is hosted by Googong's developers, Peet Limited and Mirvac.

=== KiteFest ===
KiteFest is Googong’s annual kite festival which is held at Rockley Oval on Father’s Day. The event often features notable kite enthusiasts as well as on-site entertainment.

== Population ==
At the 2021 census, there were:

- 7,444 people in Googong (State Suburbs).
- Of these 49.9% were male and 50.1% were female.
- The median age was 32.
- Of people aged 15 years and over, 61.7% of people were in a registered marriage and 14.7% were in a de facto marriage.
- Of people were attending an educational institution, 34.3% were in primary school, 19.1% in secondary school and 20.7% in a tertiary or technical institution.
- The most common responses for religion in Googong were No Religion 36.2%, Catholicism 26.6%, Anglicanism 12.2%, Not stated 4.2%, and Hinduism 3.3%.

Largest languages spoken at home in Googong (2021)
Language	Population	%
English	4,879	78.4
Punjabi	175	2.8
Macedonian	104	1.7
Malayalam	82	1.3
Hindi	58	0.9
Telugu	42	0.7

== Commercial areas ==
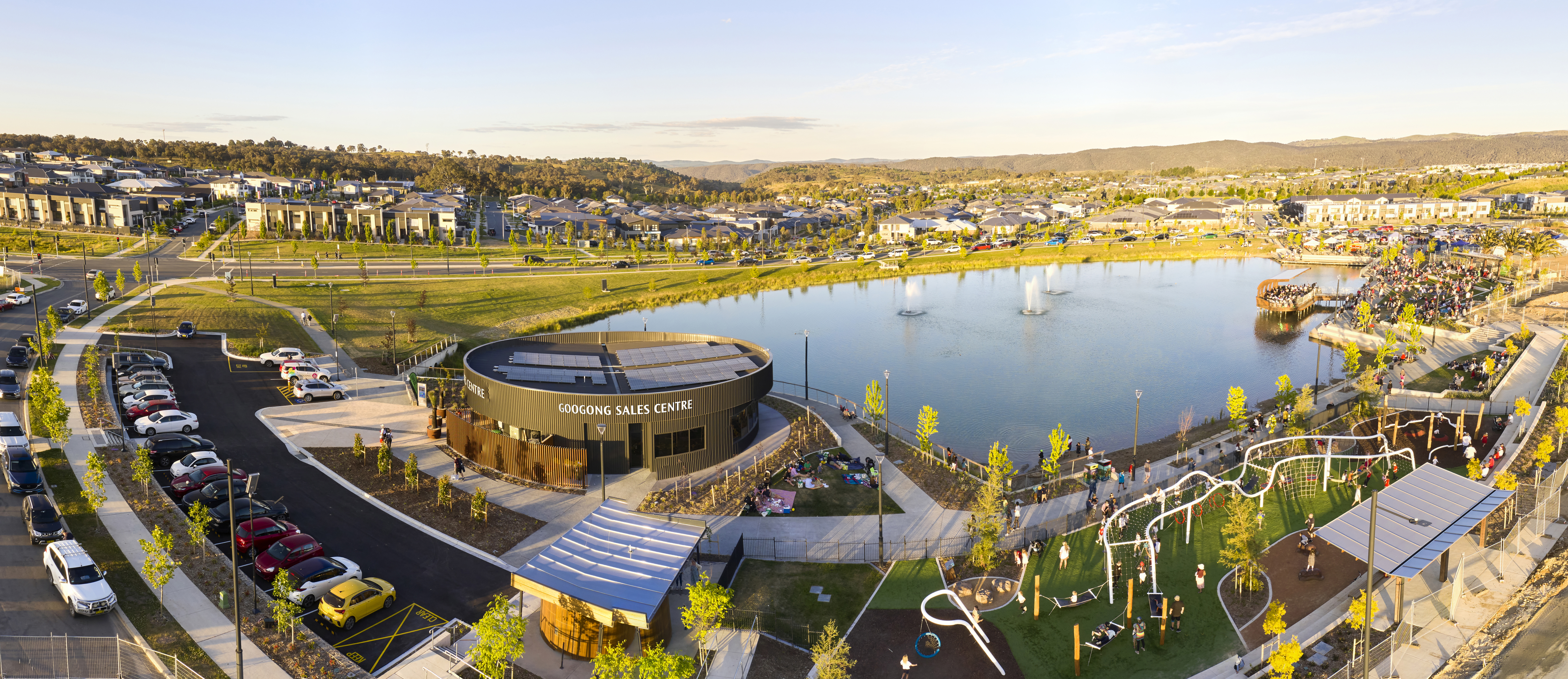
Googong land sales centre, 2022

- Googong North Village Centre opened in Googong’s first neighbourhood with a supermarket, café, hair salon, beautician, various other shops, GP clinic, dentist, physiotherapist, allied health services, discount pharmacy, vet, real estate agent, and a Community Centre
- Googong Town Centre: Plans for a $143 million town centre were revealed in 2018 in Googong Central, the town’s second neighbourhood. Work is scheduled to be completed on supermarkets and the retail precinct in late 2025/2026.
- There is a 7-Eleven store with KFC and McDonald's restaurants across from it.

== Education ==
The Anglican School Googong is a co-educational, open-entry school that caters for Early Learning through to Year 12. The Googong Public Primary School opened for Term 1, 2023. The public secondary school will be located in Googong Central. A site has been gifted to the New South Wales Government who have announced that the school will open for students in Term 1, 2027.

== Sustainability ==
The Googong Water Recycling Plant is part of an $133 million integrated water recycling system which was funded, designed and built by Googong’s developers and gifted to the Queanbeyan-Palerang Regional Council who manage the site. The recycled water is delivered through an existing network of purple-coloured pipes and taps, distinguishing it from potable water. It will be used across Googong’s public green spaces and delivered to all Googong residents, schools and businesses for non-potable uses such as watering gardens and flushing toilets. The system will recycle over half the waste water used on site, and reduce potable water consumption in the town by 60%.

Googong was awarded the Green Building Council of Australia’s first 5-Star Green Star – Communities rating in 2016. The township was given a 5-star rating based on several its initiatives including its integrated water cycle management system, open space strategy and building design guidelines. Launched in 2003, Green Star is Australia's largest voluntary and holistic sustainability rating system for buildings, fitouts and communities. Following a re-accreditation process, this rating was confirmed and extended until 2026 as the township delivered on the several sustainability initiatives promised as part of the original certification.

Googong has used ‘reconophalt’, a recycled road product, to install six netball courts and an adjacent car park within the township. The recycled road product is made from an asphalt mix of soft plastics, glass toner and reclaimed road. The product is currently undergoing trial, with the aim is for the product to be used to build roads within the township.

The Pink-tailed Worm-lizard is listed as ‘vulnerable’ under Commonwealth and State legislation and a large population of this species has been identified as occurring within the eastern part of Googong. Under part of the approval of Googong under the Environment Protection and Biodiversity Conservation Act, Googong has committed to establish, rehabilitate and dedicate to public ownership a 54ha fenced Pink-tailed Worm-lizard Conservation Area to protect this species. The township developed a second conservation area in support of the Pink-tailed Worm-lizard, which included $1m joint funding from the New South Wales Government and Googong’s developers Peet Limited and Mirvac.

In February 2021, a cat containment policy was proposed for Greater Googong. Cats are currently encouraged to be kept indoors. Cats are prohibited on public land which is zoned for 'environmental conservation'. This includes the parkland adjacent to the Googong Foreshores, as well as the Pink-tailed Worm-lizard Conservation Area. Cats found in these are likely to be controlled by rangers.

== Parks ==
Lovegrove Park is an all ability park located on Aprasia Avenue adjacent to the Googong North Village Centre. It has a large climbing teepee, slippery dip, basket swing, spinners and softfall. Shadesails cover some of the equipment in the park. There is also a covered BBQ area with seating, bins and a water refill station. Beltana Park is adjacent to Club Googong and the tennis courts on Beltana Avenue. It has a large playground with swings, nest swing, slide, large climbing net and other items suitable for all ages of children. There is also a large covered BBQ area with seating and toilets. Duncan Fields on Duncan Loop includes a playground with mini trampolines, a half-court basketball court, a covered BBQ area, tables and toilets. Rockley Oval on Rockley Parade includes a cricket pitch, nets and AFL posts, a covered BBQ area with tables and a playground which includes a mini climbing wall, swings and toilets. Yerradhang Nguru, Gumnut Playground is located at 65 Aprasia Avenue. Yerradhang Nguru, in the Aboriginal language of the Ngunawal people means Gumtree Camp. The playground has climbing structures, ping pong tables, and a small swing set. There is a large covered BBQ area with seating. Munnagai Woggabaliri Park has a BBQ area which is covered. It has a playground with swings and a spinner. All the equipment is made from timber. There is also seating available. Googong has two different dog-friendly parks, the largest of which is Barkley Dog Park which also includes a pond. Rockley Oval also includes a cricket pitch, nets and AFL posts. Googong Common includes walking and bush trails, linking several of the town's ovals and sports precinct. A chain of ponds that make up Montgomery Creek, which runs through Googong Common, are currently under restoration. Nangi Pimble is a reserve at the highest hilltop in Googong and has been planted with thousands of Allocasuarina verticillata to support a colony of glossy black cockatoo. A proposed walking trail for the area will lead to a viewing platform atop the hill. The viewing platform is currently under development. Bunyip Park opened in October 2022 and includes a bunyip themed playground with climbing structures, bunyip eggs and baby bunyip sculptures, fencing, BBQs, shade structures and toilets. It is located at 5 Glenrock Drive, Googong, and is adjacent to the town’s future town centre and the developers’ Sales Office.

== Artwork ==
The main entry to the township contains an installation called Terraformis of a 7-metre steel sculpture. The sculpture is a nod to Googong’s local ecology and geology and celebrates the foundations of its natural environment. Rusted steel blades mirror the shape of surface rock strikes, prevalent in the Googong landscape, and provide a backdrop for handcrafted precast lettering. Large arches dominate the structure and acknowledge the presence of the Molonglo Ranges, while at the same time revealing the microscopic patination of the threatened Golden Sun Moth wings.

Googong has a public artwork walk that runs throughout the Googong North and Googong Central neighbourhoods, with 15 separate artworks to see and learn about. Artwork on display along the walk includes sculptures, installations, historic markers and architecturally designed play areas.

== Sports and recreation ==
Upon completion, Googong’s sports precinct will contain the six netball courts, a pump track, a Sports and Aquatic Centre, a tennis centre, seven ovals including an athletics track, a skate park, a basketball court, pitch and putt, frisbee golf, gym stations, BBQ facilities, toilets and parking, as well as the Googong Sports and Recreation Club. The precinct is currently home to five playing fields, an asphalt pump track, a fitness trail, two tennis courts, six netball courts, putt putt golf, frisbee golf, a skate park and basketball court.

Club Googong is found in Googong’s first neighbourhood overlooking Beltana Park. The club contains a five lane 25 metre indoor pool and a small gym as well as an outdoor seating terrace. In 2019 the facility was transferred to new owners, Aquatots Swim School.

Googong has four sports teams within the township.

The Googong Goannas are a rugby league club formed in 2024, who play in the George Tooke Shield.

The Googong Hogs is a community-based AFL club that was formed in 1976 as the Harman Australian Football Club before a vote was passed in 2015 to change its name to the Googong Australian Football Club. They play at Rockley Oval.

The Googong Hogs also has netball teams from the junior ages through to senior teams. The netball teams play on courts made from ‘reconophalt’.

The Monaro Panthers is a Premier League Football Club with players from Googong as well as Queanbeyan, Jerrabomberra, Bungendore, Canberra, Sutton, Michelago and the surrounding regions.

The Queanbeyan Whites Sports and Social Club will be contained within the upcoming sports precinct. It will be built in two phases with the first phase expected to open late 2023. It will be home to local community sports clubs including the Googong Hogs AFL, Googong Hogs Netball, and Googong Monaro Panthers Football.

The club is owned and operated by the Queanbeyan Rugby Union Football Club, who are based in the nearby town of Queanbeyan, New South Wales. They have earned the nickname 'Queanbeyan Whites' due to the colour of their playing jersey. The club competes in the ACTRU Premier Division. The club has produced several former professional and international rugby union stars including David Campese, Matt Giteau, Anthony Fainga’a, Saia Fainga’a, Tevita Kuridrani and Nic White.

== Awards and recognition ==
In 2019, Googong received top honours at the 2019 Urban Development Institute of Australia (UDIA) NSW awards, winning both the Excellence in Masterplanned Communities and Excellence in NSW Regional Development categories. In 2020, Googong won the award for Excellence in Marketing. The UDIA runs a prestigious annual awards ceremony for projects and leaders in the urban development industry. The township was also the winner of several other UDIA Awards including:

- UDIA NSW Awards for Excellence – Concept Design 2011
- UDIA NSW Awards for Excellence – Excellence in Southern NSW Regions and ACT Development 2016
- Commendation UDIA NSW Awards for Excellence – Environmental Technology and Sustainability 2016
- UDIA NSW Awards for Excellence – Masterplanned Communities 2019
- UDIA NSW Awards for Excellence – NSW Regional Development 2019
- UDIA NSW Awards for Excellence – Marketing 2020
- ACT Property Council Awards

In 2020, Googong was awarded the Rider Levett Bucknall (RLB) ACT Development of the Year award. The RLB ACT Development of the Year award is part of the 2020 Property Council of Australia / Rider Levett Bucknall Innovation and Excellence Awards program.

== Gallery ==
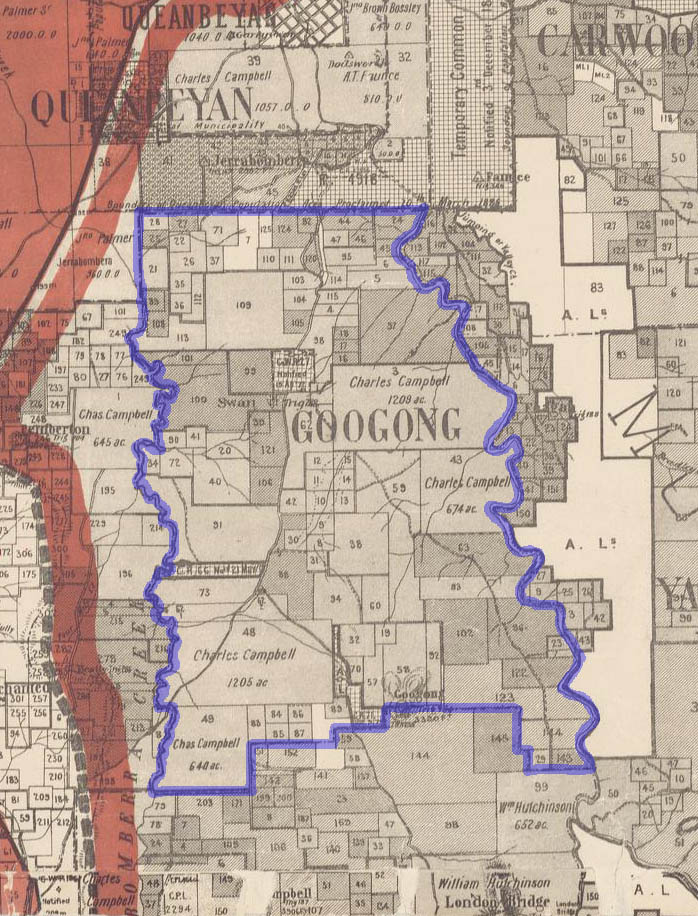
1909 map of the Parish of Googong (blue border).

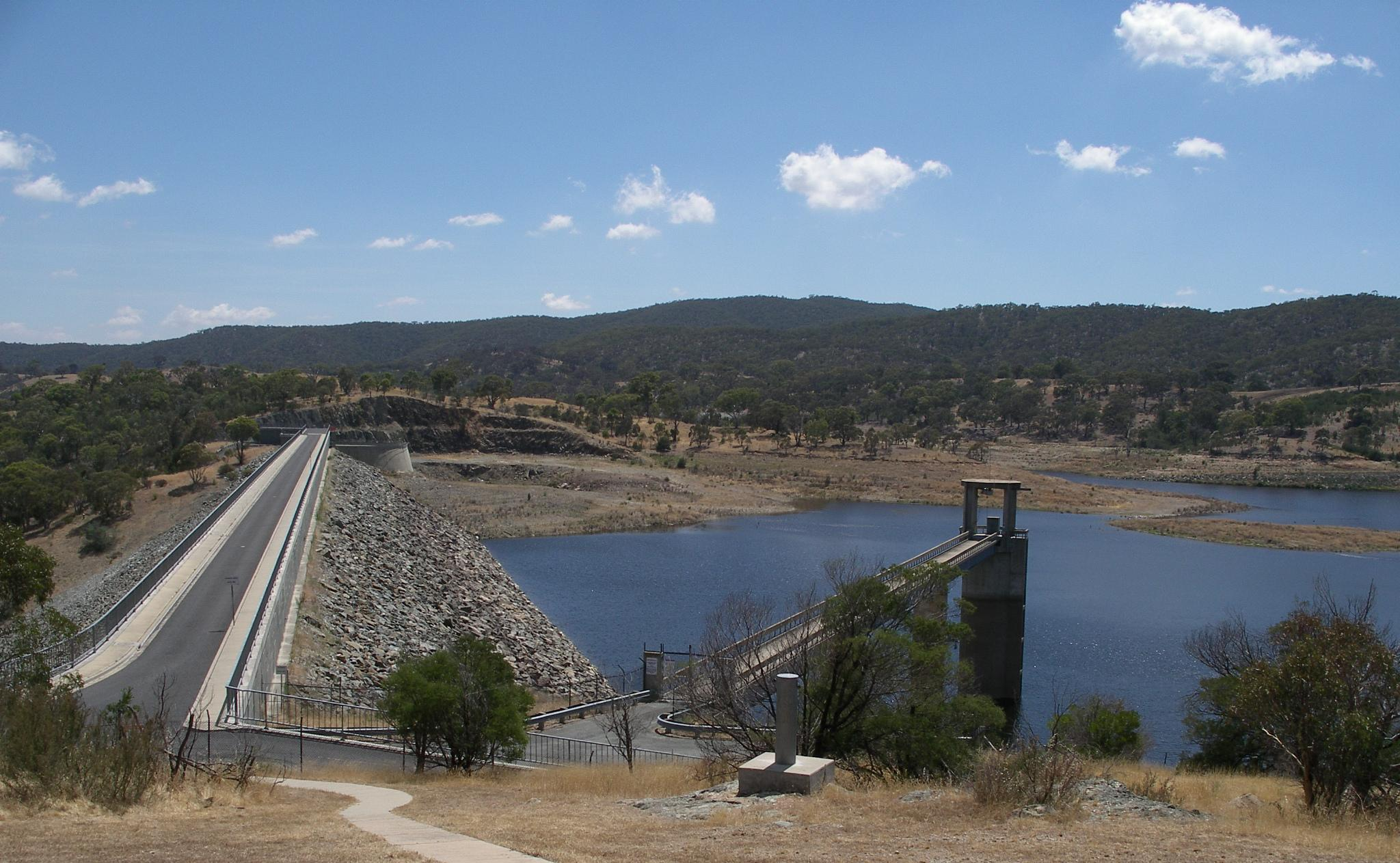
The Googong Dam.

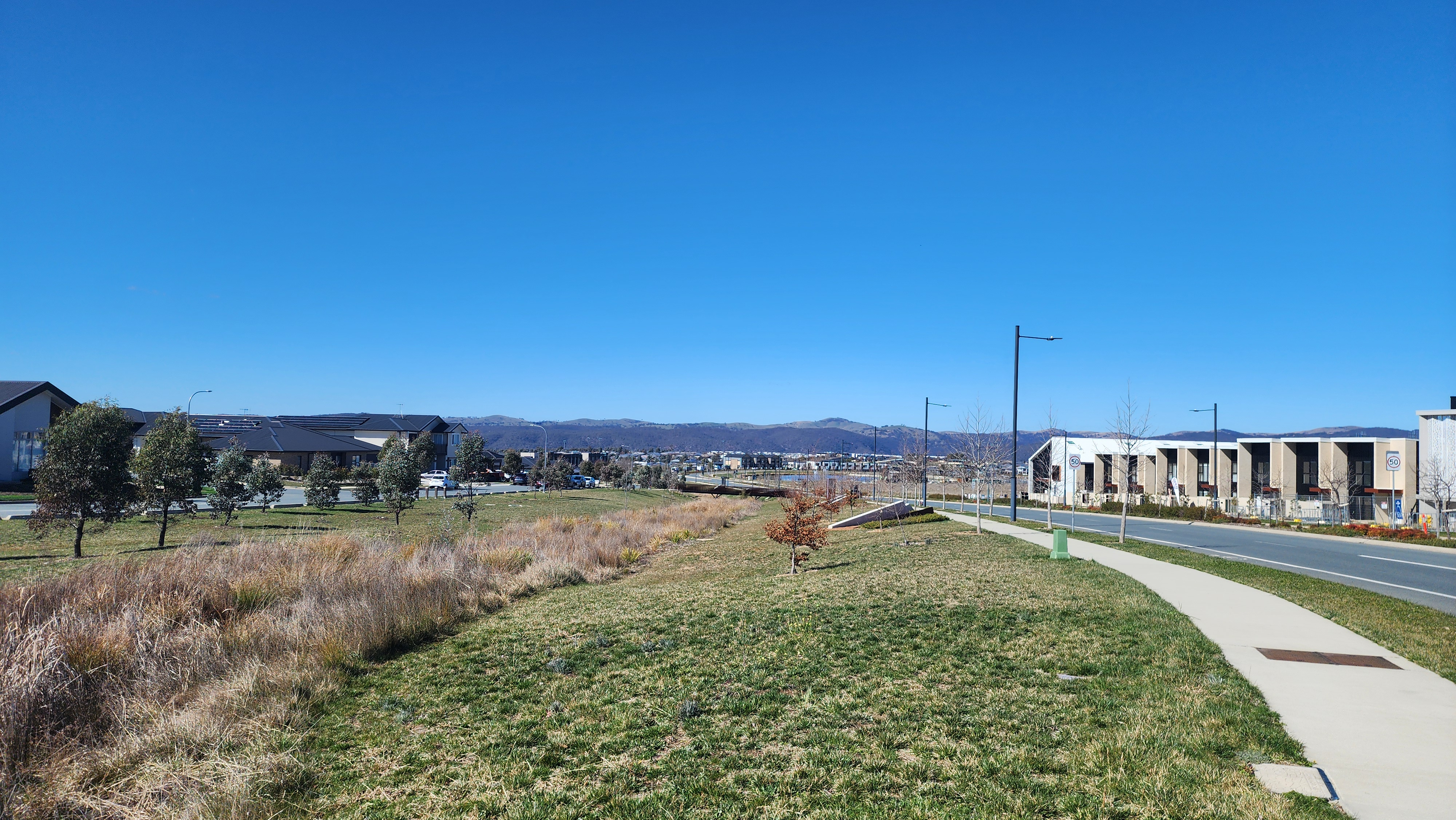
Looking through Wellsvale Drive
