= Elizabeth Banks (disambiguation) =

Elizabeth Banks (born 1974) is an American actress and filmmaker.

Elizabeth Banks may also refer to:

- Elizabeth Lindsay Banks (1849–1933), a British-Australian kindergarten teacher
- Elizabeth Banks (journalist) (1872–1938), American journalist and author
- Elizabeth Banks (architect) (born 1941), British landscape architect and first woman president of the Royal Horticultural Society
- Lizzy Banks (born 1990), British cyclist
