= Williamsdale, New South Wales =

Williamsdale New South Wales
- Coordinates: 35°35′27″S 149°10′12″E
- Population: 63 (2016 census)
- Elevation: 737 m (2,418 ft)
- Location: 41 km (25 mi) S of Canberra; 82 km (51 mi) N of Cooma; 321 km (199 mi) SW of Sydney
- LGA(s): Queanbeyan-Palerang Region; Snowy Monaro Regional Council
- State electorate(s): Monaro
- Federal division(s): Eden-Monaro
Localities around Williamsdale:
Tuggeranong (district) (ACT); Williamsdale (ACT)	Royalla	Burra
The Angle	Williamsdale	Burra
Clear Range	Michelago	Burra

Williamsdale is a locality situated immediately on the south-east side of the New South Wales border abutting the locality of Williamsdale in south-eastern Australian Capital Territory, Australia. The Monaro Highway and the former Bombala railway pass through the village. A railway station saw service from 1891 until 1975. The postcode is 2620.

The part of Williamsdale in NSW is itself split up by two Local Government Areas, in the north to Queanbeyan–Palerang and in the south to Snowy Monaro.

== Geology ==
To the east of Williamsdale is the Williamsdale Volcanics. These are made up from blue-green crystal tuff. The crystals are sized from 0.3 mm to 1 mm and are embedded in a fine matrix. Quartz crystals make up 25%, plagioclase 5%, alkali feldspar 10%, biotite 5–10% which is altered to chlorite, epidote and leucoxene.

Middle Silurian Colinton Volcanics foliated dacite and tuff is under Williamsdale. A roughly north south band of these acid volcanics extends to the north along the Monaro Highway and then follows the Cooma road to Cottondale. South the volcanics also follow the Monaro Highway in a more complex band through Colinton past Michelago and at least as far south as Bredbo.

To the west of Williamsdale is an outcrop of Upper Silurian Laidlaw Volcanics dark grey rhyodacitic and dacitic crystal tuff. This extends to the west as far as Angle Crossing. This band extends to the north north west as far as Mount Stromlo. The outcrop finishes a couple of kilometres south, but it is also found to the east, with outcrop from Fernleigh in the north, via Burra, and south to Michelago.

On the west side of the Murrumbidgee River around Angle Crossing can be found the Bransby Beds or Goosoon Beds. These beds contain tuff and dacite with some sediments. They form a narrow band extending to the south as far as Cooma following on the east side of the Murrumbidgee River.

A quarry is also situated in Williamsdale, New South Wales.
