= Jerrabomberra Creek =

Coordinates: 35°19′S 149°09′E

- Etymology: Aboriginal: "afraid of lightning"

Location
- Country: Australia
- State/Territory: New South Wales; Australian Capital Territory
- IBRA: South Eastern Highlands
- District: Capital Country
- Municipality: Queanbeyan-Palerang

Physical characteristics
- Source: below Lobb Hill
  - location: between Williamsdale and Royalla, NSW
  - elevation: 1,010 m (3,310 ft)
- Mouth: confluence with Molonglo River
  - location: Lake Burley Griffin, ACT
  - elevation: 554 m (1,818 ft)
- Length: 35 km (22 mi)
- Basin size: 128 km^{2} (49 sq mi)

Basin features
- River system: Murrumbidgee River, Murray–Darling basin
- Reservoir: Lake Burley Griffin

Jerrabomberra Creek, a partly perennial stream of the Murrumbidgee catchment within the Murray–Darling basin, is located in the Capital Country region spanning both New South Wales and the Australian Capital Territory, Australia.

Jerrabomberra is derived from the Aboriginal word, meaning "afraid of lightning". The traditional custodians of the land surrounding Jerrabomberra Creek are the Ngunnawal Aboriginal people; it lies close to the lands of the neighbouring Ngarigo people.

== Location and features ==
The creek rises in New South Wales (NSW), below Lobb Hill, between Williamsdale and Royalla, and flows generally north and north–west, before reaching its confluence with the Molonglo River into Lake Burley Griffin, to the north of Narrabundah, in South Canberra, within the Australian Capital Territory (ACT). The creek descends 452 metres (1,483 ft) over its 35 kilometres (22 mi) course, and has a catchment area of 128 square kilometres (49 sq mi).

=== Jerrabomberra Wetlands ===
Prior to reaching Lake Burley Griffin, the creek flows through a series of significant artificially-formed wetlands, the Jerrabomberra Wetlands, with an estimated 170 bird species, including the migratory Latham’s snipe; and eleven fish species, as well as the eastern water rat, platypus and eastern snake-necked tortoise. The wetlands include a silt trap, a series of billabongs, and a swamp.

== See also ==
- List of rivers of Australia
