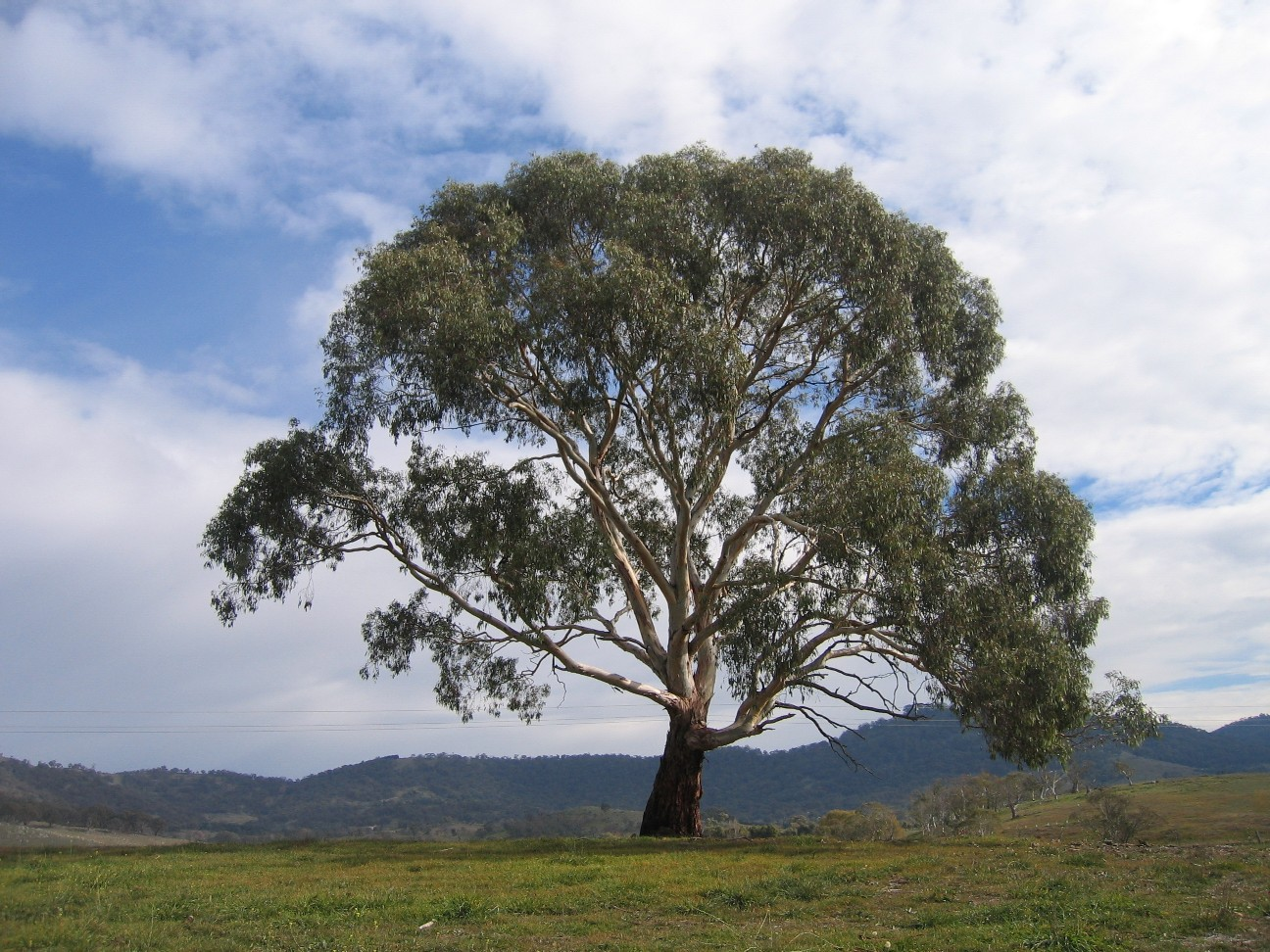
- Eucalyptus rubida in Burra, New South Wales

Conservation status
- Near Threatened (IUCN 3.1)

Scientific classification
- Kingdom: Plantae
- Clade: Tracheophytes
- Clade: Angiosperms
- Clade: Eudicots
- Clade: Rosids
- Order: Myrtales
- Family: Myrtaceae
- Genus: Eucalyptus
- Species: E. rubida

Binomial name
- Eucalyptus rubida H.Deane & Maiden

= Eucalyptus rubida =

Candlebark

Species of eucalyptus

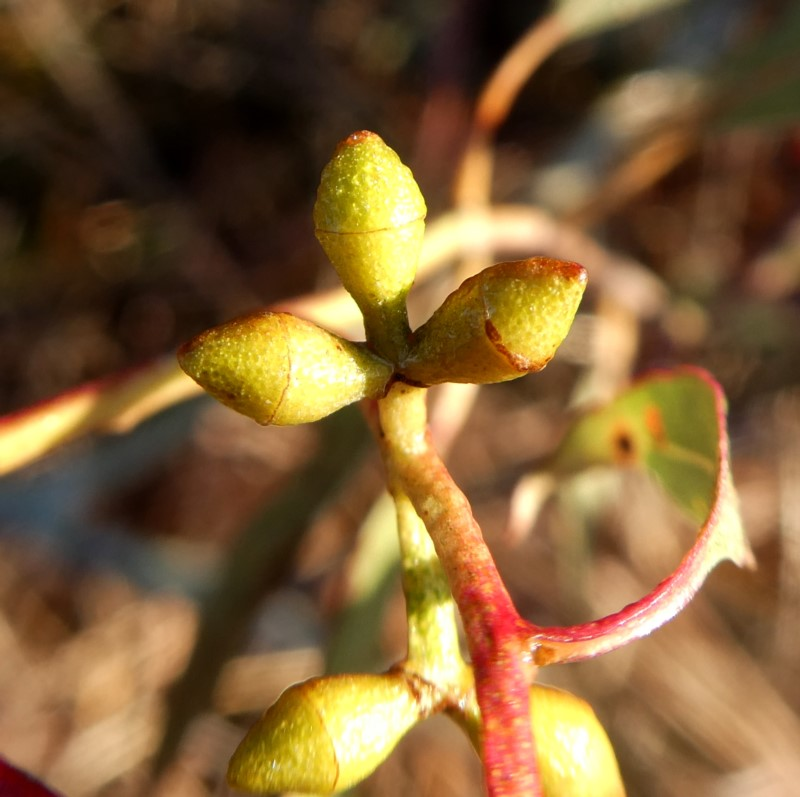
Flower buds

Eucalyptus rubida, commonly known as candlebark, ribbon gum or white gum, is a species of small to medium-sized tree that is endemic to south-eastern Australia. It has smooth bark, sometimes with rough bark at the base, lance-shaped or curved adult leaves, flower buds in groups of three, white flowers and cup-shaped, hemispherical or bell-shaped fruit.

== Description ==
Eucalyptus rubida is a tree that typically grows to a height of 20–40 m (66–131 ft) and forms a lignotuber. It has smooth, powdery, greyish or pink bark that is shed in long ribbons but there is sometimes persistent fibrous bark near the base of the trunk. Young plants and coppice regrowth have sessile, glaucous, more or less round leaves 2–6 mm (0.079–0.236 in) wide arranged in opposite pairs. Adult leaves are arranged alternately, lance-shaped to curved, 80–175 mm (3.1–6.9 in) long and 8–34 mm (0.31–1.34 in) wide, tapering to a petiole 10–35 mm (0.39–1.38 in) long. The flower buds are arranged in leaf axils in groups of three on an unbranched peduncle, the individual buds sessile or an pedicels up to 4 mm (0.16 in) long. Mature buds are oval to spindle-shaped, 5–9 mm (0.20–0.35 in) long and 3–5 mm (0.12–0.20 in) wide with a conical to rounded operculum. Flowering mainly occurs from December to April and the flowers are white. The fruit is a woody cup-shaped, hemispherical or bell-shaped capsule 3–6 mm (0.12–0.24 in) long and 4–8 mm (0.16–0.31 in) wide with the valves near rim level or protruding slightly.

== Taxonomy and naming ==
Eucalyptus rubida was first formally described in 1899 by Henry Deane and Joseph Maiden in Proceedings of the Linnean Society of New South Wales. The specific epithet (rubida) is from the Latin word rubidus meaning "red", referring to the seasonally red bark.

In 1991, Lawrie Johnson and Ken Hill described two subspecies and the names are accepted by the Australian Plant Census as at December 2019:

- Eucalyptus rubida subsp. barbigerorum L.A.S.Johnson & K.D.Hill, commonly known as blackbutt candlebark, has elliptic juvenile leaves and a trunk with thick, rough bark at the base;
- Eucalyptus rubida H.Deane & Maiden subsp. rubida has round juvenile leaves and smooth bark to ground level.

== Distribution and habitat ==
Candlebark grows in woodland and forest, usually in shallow soils on tablelands, hills and slopes. Subspecies barbigerorum occurs on the Northern Tablelands north of Armidale. Subspecies rubida occurs on the Southern Tablelands of New South Wales, mainly on the northern side of the Great Dividing Range in Victoria, between Halls Gap and Delegate, and on the tablelands and mountain slopes of eastern Tasmania.

== Conservation status ==
Subspecies barbigerorum is classified as "vulnerable" under the Australian Government Environment Protection and Biodiversity Conservation Act 1999. The main threats to the subspecies are habitat disturbance caused by agriculture, development and road work and by timber collection.

== See also ==
- List of Eucalyptus species
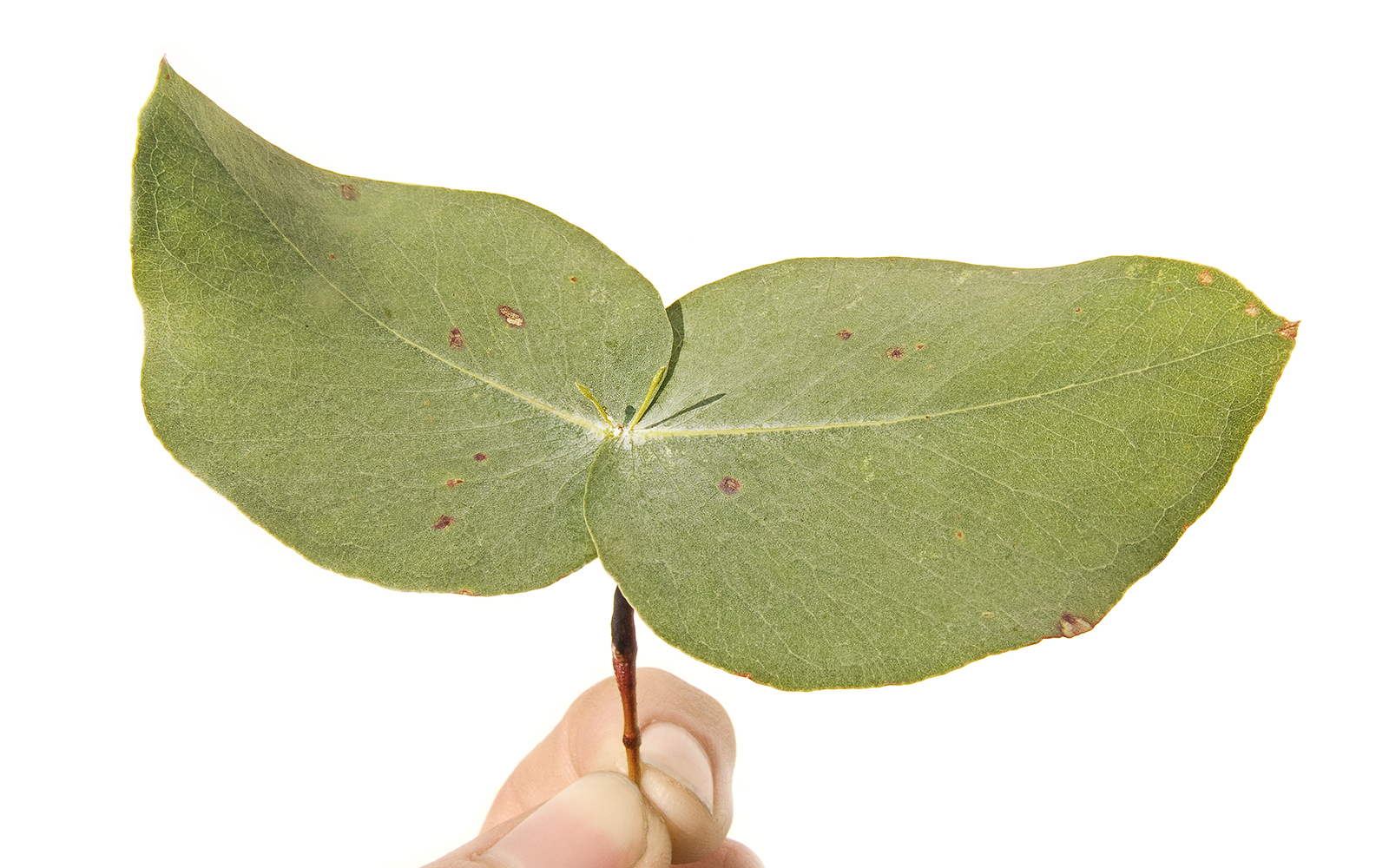
Leaves of the immature tree

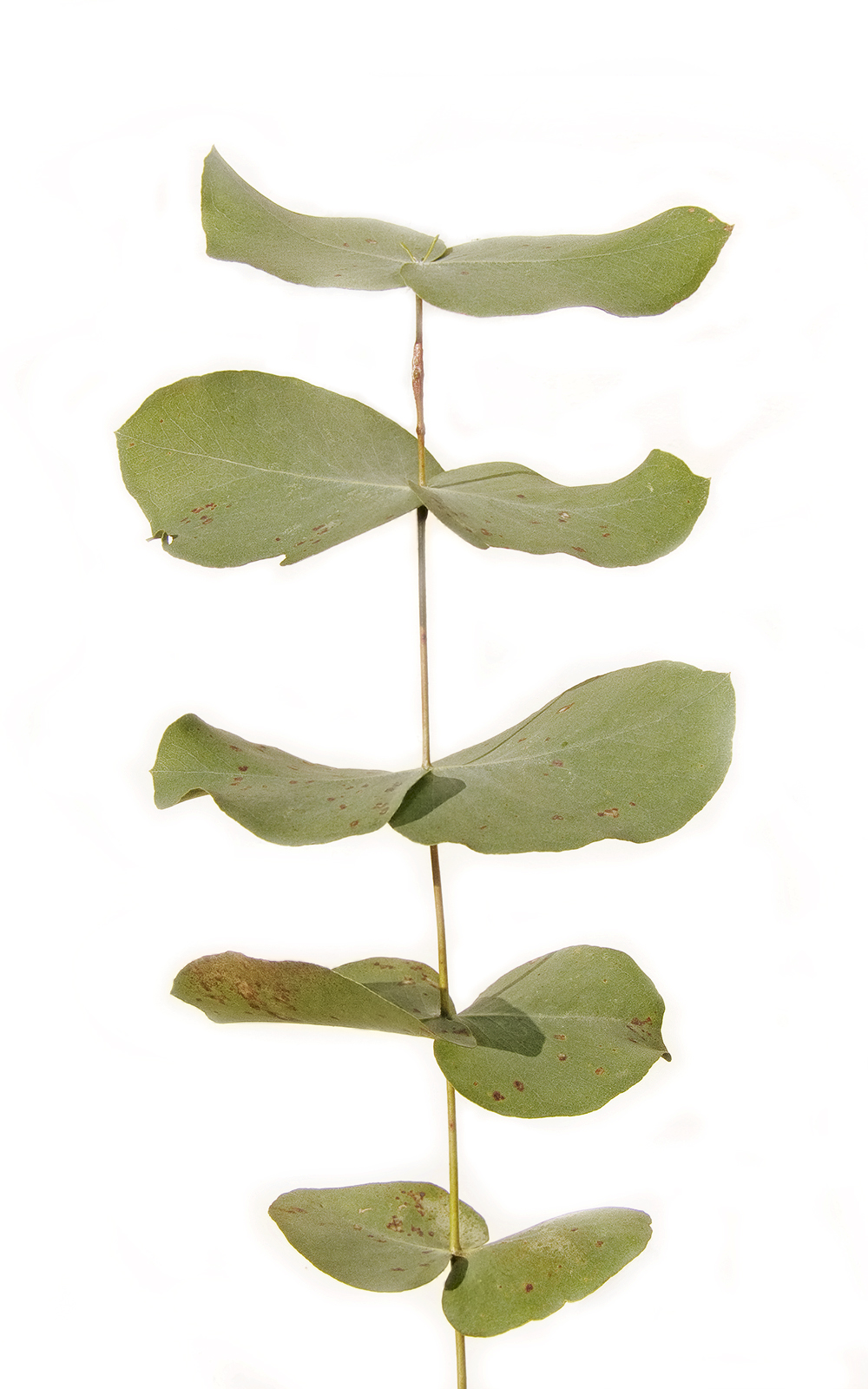
Leaves of the immature tree

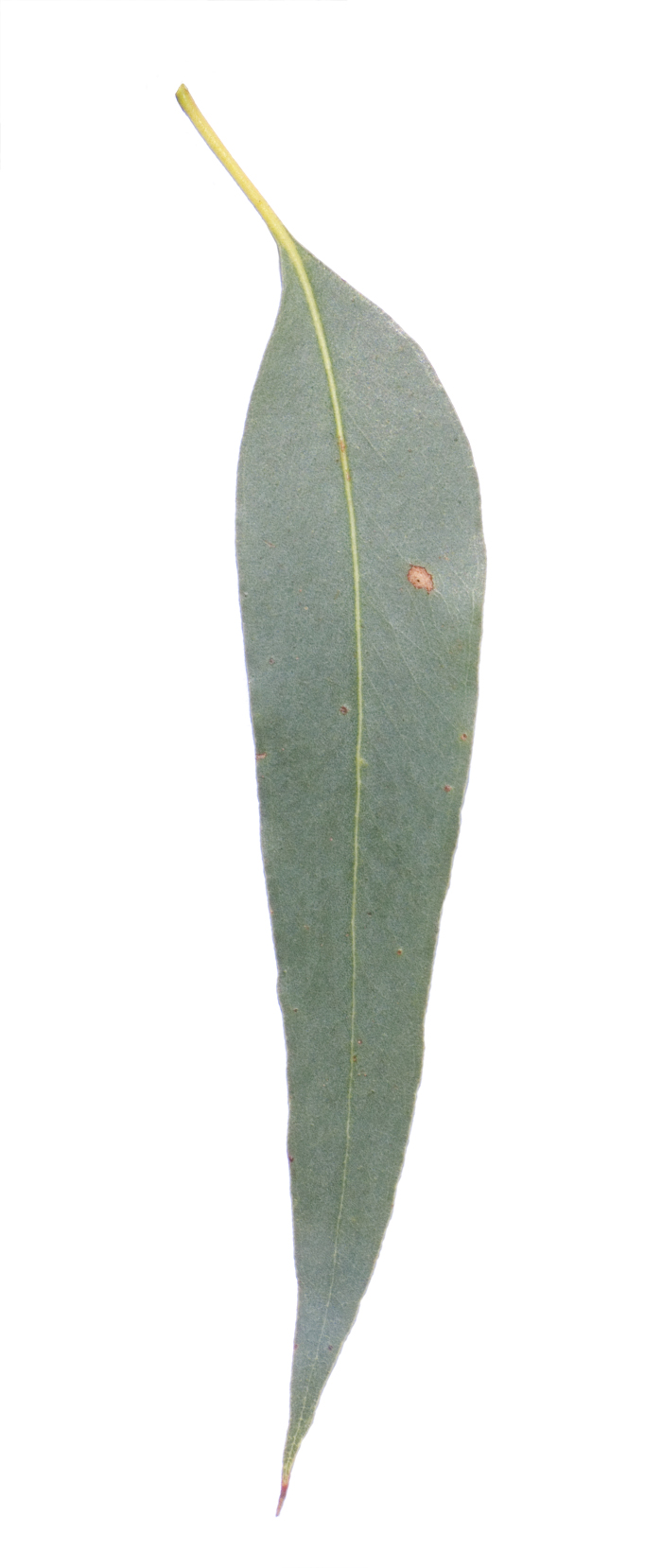
Adult leaf
