= Burra, New South Wales =

Burra
- Suburb
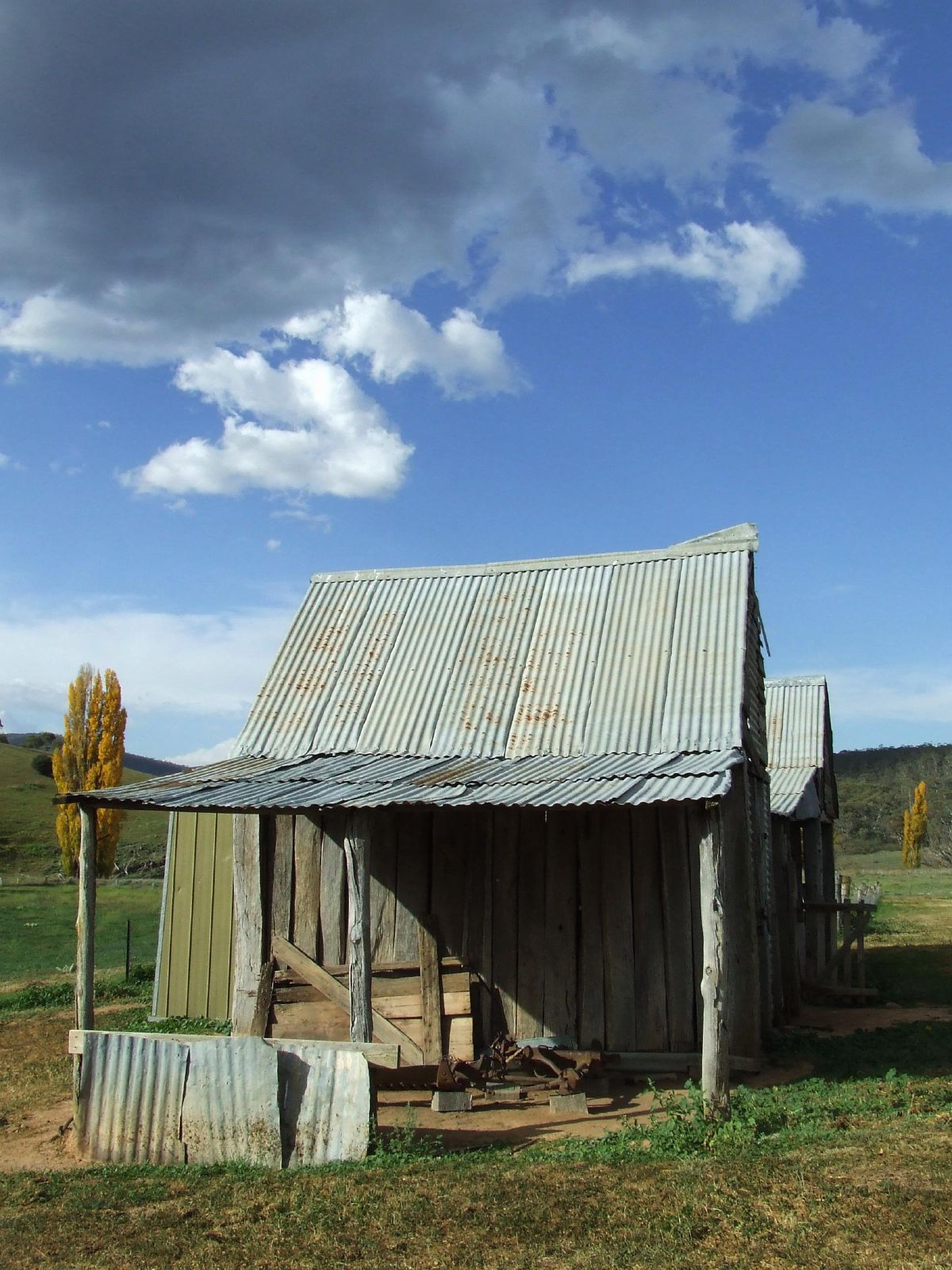
- London Bridge Homestead, an early Burra residence now contained within the Googong Foreshores.

- Coordinates: 35°33′39″S 149°13′13″E
- Country: Australia
- State: New South Wales
- LGA: Queanbeyan-Palerang Region
- Location: 44 km (27 mi) SSW of Canberra; 25 km (16 mi) S of Queanbeyan; 89 km (55 mi) N of Cooma; 313 km (194 mi) SW of Sydney

Government
  - State electorate: Monaro
  - Federal division: Eden-Monaro
- Elevation: 751 m (2,464 ft)

Population
  - Total: 790 (2021 census)
- Postcode: 2620
- County: Murray
- Parish: Burra
Suburbs around Burra
Royalla	Googong	Yarrow
Royalla	Burra	Urila
Williamsdale	Michelago	Tinderry

Burra is an Australian locality of rural smallholdings lying 20 kilometres to the south of Queanbeyan, New South Wales in the Queanbeyan-Palerang Region. At the 2021 census, Burra had a population of 790 people.

== History ==
The Ngarigo people originally inhabited Burra as part of their wider country lands extending south to the Australian Alps. The first European camp was called 'The Creek' although it soon became known amongst the early settlers as "The Burra", possibly from a local aboriginal word (for instance, the Ngarigo word "berra", meaning boomerang). The first grazing and clearing of the area began in the 1830-60s and farms in the Burra Valley were established at the Warm Corner, KT Park, Burra Station (the original 'creek' station), London Bridge and Lagoon. By the 1920s the local population had become large enough to support two competing cricket clubs, one at the Burra park, the other near Urila. Subdivision into smaller blocks began in the 1960s as Canberra's population expanded and has created the local regions such as those surrounding Candy Road, Badgery Road and Plummers Road. Today the majority of the area has been subdivided in this way.

Burra lies at the northern tip of the Monaro tablelands, and shares with it some of the cooler climate of that region. Temperatures are on average two or three degrees Celsius below those in Canberra and Queanbeyan. Light falls of snow are not uncommon in the winter months.

=== Heritage listings ===
Burra includes a number of heritage-listed sites, including:

- London Bridge Road: Googong Foreshores

== Geography ==
Part of the Burra valley has always been treeless. Elsewhere remnants of uncleared open woodland of snow gum, candlebark, yellow box, apple box and small leaved peppermint remain. Black sally and manna gum are found in the cooler gullies and frost hollows. The wooded hills to the east are rocky and dry, sporting primarily small leafed peppermint, brittle gum and scribbly gum. This area has never been heavily grazed and is in its original natural condition, in 2001 a part of it was protected by the creation of the Burra Creek Nature Reserve. The steeper slopes of the hills to the west of the Burra Valley, including Mount Campbell and Gibraltar Peak (and known by some Burrans as the "Purple Veil" range due to their shaded afternoon colour) are patchily covered by a forest type similar to the wet sclerophyll that occurs further to the west on the Mount Clear Range and in Namadgi National Park.

Most of the region is underlain by the Colinton Volcanics, composed of light grey tuff and lavas deposited in shallow water by large explosive volcanic eruptions during the Silurian period, 425 million years ago. A fault runs parallel and to the east of the Burra Road, beyond which are the even older deep sea Ordovician sandy sediments of the Pittman formation, deposited from the mouth of a very large river which drained the nearby supercontinent Gondwana. A few limestone lenses occur in younger rocks near to this fault, one of which forms the locally famous "London Bridge" natural arch over the Burra Creek. This limestone contains a few broken fossil crinoid stems brachiopods, and tabulate corals. In the 1920–30s there was some prospecting of iron, lead and silver along this fault but this was never commercially successful.
