= Williamsdale, Australian Capital Territory =

Williamsdale
- Town
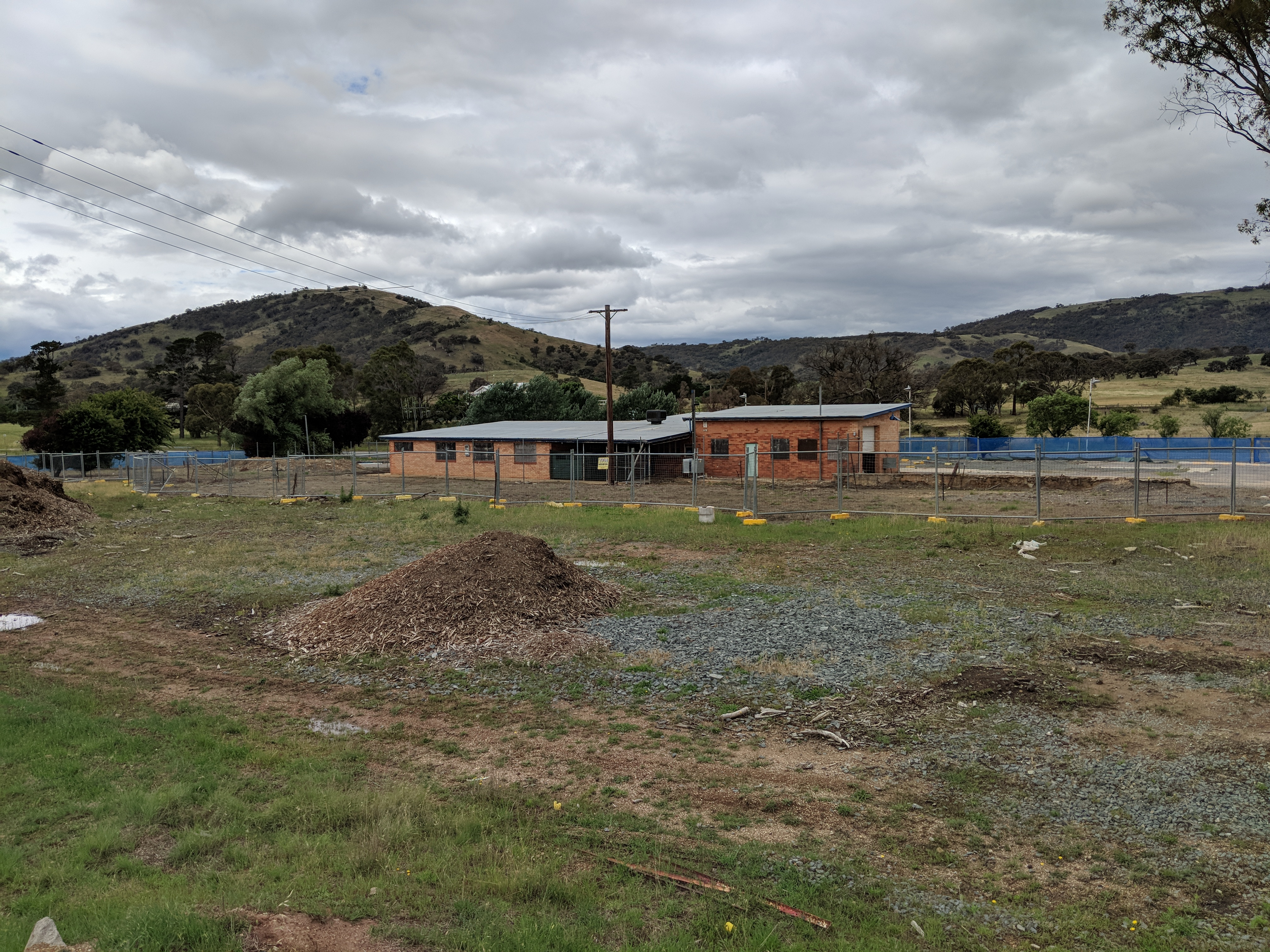
- Abandoned garage in Williamsdale

- Coordinates: 35°34′11″S 149°08′05″E
- Country: Australia
- State: Australian Capital Territory
- District: Tuggeranong
- Location: 35 km (22 mi) S of Canberra

Government
  - Territory electorate: Brindabella
  - Federal division: Bean

Population
  - Total: 43 (2021 census)
Localities around Williamsdale
Paddys River (district)	Tuggeranong (district)	Royalla (NSW)
Tennent (district)	Williamsdale	Williamsdale (NSW)
Tennent (district)	The Angle	Williamsdale (NSW)

Williamsdale is a town in the district of Tuggeranong, in the Australian Capital Territory in Australia. Is situated on the northwest side of the Australian Capital Territory border abutting the town of Williamsdale in the Southern Tablelands region of New South Wales, Australia. The Monaro Highway and the former Bombala railway pass through the area. A railway station saw service until 1975. The postcode is 2620.

== Structure ==
The Australian Bureau of Statistics included the ACT part of Williamsdale in an area called "Tuggeranong (SA2)". This statistical area also includes the ACT part of Royalla and all the rural territory between the Murrumbidgee River and the NSW border. It had a population of 43 at the 2021 census. The part in NSW had a population of 65 at that census.

The part of Williamsdale in NSW is itself split up by two Local Government Areas, in the north to Queanbeyan–Palerang and in the south to Snowy Monaro.

== Geology ==
To the east of Williamsdale is the Williamsdale Volcanics. These are made up from blue-green crystal tuff. The crystals are sized from 0.3 mm to 1 mm and are embedded in a fine matrix. Quartz crystals make up 25%, plagioclase 5%, alkali feldspar 10%, biotite 5–10% which is altered to chlorite, epidote and leucoxene.

Middle Silurian Colinton Volcanics foliated dacite and tuff is under Williamsdale. A roughly north south band of these acid volcanics extends to the north along the Monaro Highway and then follows the Cooma road to Cottondale. South the volcanics also follow the Monaro Highway in a more complex band through Colinton past Michelago and at least as far south as Bredbo.

To the west of Williamsdale is an outcrop of Upper Silurian Laidlaw Volcanics dark grey rhyodacitic and dacitic crystal tuff. This extends to the west as far as Angle Crossing. This band extends to the north north west as far as Mount Stromlo. The outcrop finishes a couple of kilometres south, but it is also found to the east, with outcrop from Fernleigh in the north, via Burra, and south to Michelago.

On the west side of the Murrumbidgee River around Angle Crossing can be found the Bransby Beds or Goosoon Beds. These beds contain tuff and dacite with some sediments. They form a narrow band extending to the south as far as Cooma following on the east side of the Murrumbidgee River.

== Airport proposal ==
In response to increasing operating costs for general aviation users of Canberra Airport, a proposal was made by the ACT Government in 2005 to develop a dedicated secondary airfield for the Territory. The site recommended was to the west of the Monaro Highway at Williamsdale, and would include aircraft hangars, maintenance and fuel facilities, and a 1000m grass runway. A feasibility study was undertaken by Deloitte Access Economics in 2010. Based on the results of this study, the project anticipated marginal returns on the capital investment required, despite significant demand for such a facility. As of 2012, the ACT government has declined to develop the facility, but has made the cost benefit analysis and feasibility study reports available should private enterprise wish to consider the project.

== Solar farm ==
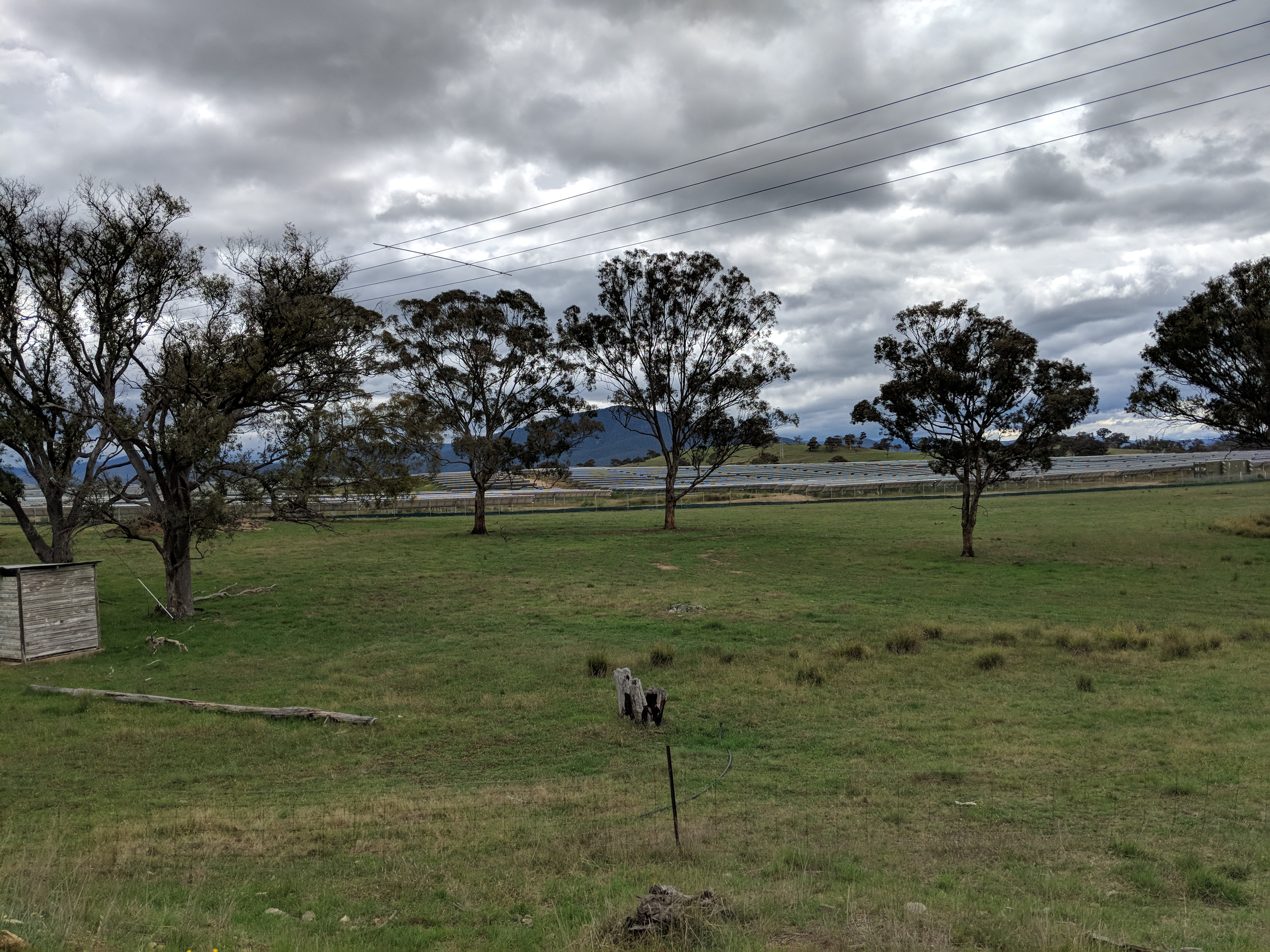
Willamsdale solar farm

In September 2012, utilities provider ActewAGL was granted an exemption by the ACT Government from having to conduct a further Environmental impact assessment on a plan to construct a 45ha electricity generation facility consisting of 15 photovoltaic solar arrays with a total generating capacity of 20 megawatts and associated infrastructure adjacent to the Monaro Highway at Williamsdale. The land to be occupied by the proposed solar farm was acquired by ActewAGL in 2009, and was considered preferable to an alternative site in the West Belconnen district.

The project was later reduced in scope to 11.8 megawatts. It was approved in January 2016 by the ACT Planning Minister, Mick Gentleman. Subsequently, Elementus Energy which had owned the project sold it to a subsidiary of Melbourne-based Impact Investment Group, and the German company ib vogt GmbH was contracted for the construction. The first solar panel was installed in October 2016. Construction was completed in October 2017. It uses a single axis sun-tracking system.
