= Elizabeth Lindsay Banks =

British-Australian kindergarten teacher (1849–1933)

Elizabeth Lindsay Banks (1849–1933) was a British-Australian kindergarten teacher.

== Early career ==
Born in Dundee, Scotland, Banks trained as a kindergarten teacher in Scotland and Germany. In Germany, she studied under the directorship of Vollmer, a pupil of the German educationalist Friedrich Fröbel, who had coined the concept of a kindergarten to the English-speaking world.

== Move to Sydney ==
She had accompanied her ill sister to Sydney, Australia, in 1886. That year, when her sister got better, she applied to teach with the Department of Public Instruction. She was appointed infant mistress at the Public Kindergarten Infants School in Sydney the same year, which was considered widely successful and led her to be seen as an authority on kindergarten teaching methods.

In 1887, some of the works of her pupils received accreditation at the Adelaide Jubilee International Exhibition with a diploma and bronze medal. In 1888, they received a gold medal at the Melbourne Centennial Exhibition; later that year, Banks gave the first public demonstration of her kindergarten methods with 150 children at the Women's Industries and Centenary Fair in Sydney.

In 1889, Banks was appointed to the Fort Street Model School as an expert in kindergarten instruction. This included teaching the infant school children in her methods for one hour per week, as well as training educators in her methods. In 1891, Banks lectured in kindergarten methods to students at the Hurlstone Teacher Training College for Female Teachers.

Bank's modified version of the kindergarten method became popular in New South Wales, whereby the educationalist and chief inspector of schools, Frederick Bridges, issued kindergarten exercises in his revised handbook for infant schools.

In 1901, after nine months' leave, Banks was re-appointed as the infants' mistress at Fort Street. In 1912, she was awarded a classification for good service, and she remained at Fort Street until she retired in September 1917.

== Death ==
Banks died 1 September 1933, age 84, and was cremated at Rookwood Cemetery.
