= Googong Foreshores =

- Location within New South Wales
- 35.5184°S 149.2578°E
- Location: London Bridge Road, Burra, New South Wales, Australia

Commonwealth Heritage List
- Official name: Googong Foreshores Cultural and Geodiversity Heritage Areas
- Type: Listed place (Historic)
- Designated: 3 November 2017
- Reference no.: 106072

Googong Foreshores is a heritage-listed historic precinct at London Bridge Road, Burra, New South Wales, Australia. It consists of the historic surroundings of the Googong Dam that predated the dam itself. It is also known as the Googong Foreshores Cultural and Geodiversity Heritage Areas. It was added to the Australian Commonwealth Heritage List on 3 November 2017.

== History ==
Aboriginal people have lived in area around the Queanbeyan River for thousands of years. Googong Foreshores contains physical evidence of that, including sites containing stone artefact scatters, a scarred tree, cairns (potentially associated with burials) and campsites. An excavation of a shelter immediately outside Burra Cave revealed some quartz flaking debris and two hearths "dating from 700 to 900 BP with some charred bone material".

In 1823, the "London Bridge" arch was first described by Captain Mark Currie during an exploration in which he named the Monaro Plains. In 1834, Joseph Kenyon started a cattle run at "Katy's Flat" but was soon forced to leave due to poor conditions.

Two pastoral properties were established in the area, divided by the Burra Creek. The west bank was granted to William Hutchinson in 1836, who conducted the "Burra Estate", a pastoral run of 5,293 acres (2,142 hectares), in absentia. The east bank was acquired by John McNamara Sr. through Crown grant and selection in 1857, and was later known as "London Bridge". In 1872, McNamara acquired 1,902 acres (770 hectares) of the Burra Estate and began farming sheep.

McNamara Sr died in 1901, and his son, John McNamara Jr, inherited the property and moved there to live. The estate was sharply reduced in 1904 by the auction of 3,442 acres (1,393 hectares) from London Bridge North and, in 1908, McNamara Jr. and his family left the district for Sydney. They leased the property to Fred Campbell of Woden, who installed Arthur Warwick as overseer.

In 1912, the lease expired on the London Bridge homestead, and McNamara Jr. leased his property to his neighbour at London Bridge, James Moore. McNamara Jr. returned to London Bridge in 1914, but died in residence in 1915. The property was again leased to the Moores until being sold to Edward and Jim Noone on 21 January 1921.

London Bridge Homestead was purchased by Robert Douglas in 1928, and shearing at the old woolshed ceased in the same year. Sheep were shorn at Burra Station for a period until Douglas commissioned a new woolshed during the Depression years. The orchard was planted or extended at this time. Electric power was connected to London Bridge homestead in 1954, at a cost of £200.

In 1973, 5089 hectares of land, including London Bridge, north and south, was acquired by the Commonwealth of Australia from New South Wales for the creation of the Googong Reservoir Foreshores. Andrew Douglas leased a section of the London Bridge Homestead property back from the Commonwealth. The Commonwealth enacted the Canberra Water Supply (Googong Dam) Act 1974 (Googong Dam Act) in 1974. That Act vested control over water supply and management of the Googong Dam Area in the Australian Capital Territory Executive, acting on behalf of the Commonwealth.

The construction of Googong Dam was completed in 1978. In 1983, the ACT government commissioned Philip Cox and Associates to prepare a Conservation Management Plan for the London Bridge homestead and, in 1999, conservation work was undertaken there.

== Description ==
The Googong Foreshores Cultural and Geodiversity Heritage Area is a 223-hectare area of land largely cleared for pastoral use. A small river called Burra Creek runs through the location. There is also a collection of farm buildings including the London Bridge Homestead group, a woolshed and squatter's quarters.

The London Bridge Homestead group of buildings is located near to Burra Creek and the buildings are arranged in an "L" shape. Four buildings are included in the homestead group: a stone cottage, a slab hut, a lath and plaster building, and a weatherboard building with a fibro annex. The woolshed and shearer's quarters are located approximately 1.5 km away from the homestead.

The area also includes a distinctive natural limestone formation, London Bridge Arch, which acts as a natural bridge over a section of the Burra Creek. London Bridge Arch formed in limestone which contains fossils of brachiopods, corals, crinoids and trilobites. It developed, along with several smaller caves, from erosion at a meander bend in Burra Creek. Formation of the arch resulted in a meander cut off which occurs when the two closest parts of a meander bend are directly connected, usually causing the river to abandon the meander loop and continue straight downstream. An abandoned meander loop, or billabong, is visible east of Burra Creek.

The limestone which includes the arch and caves is a small lens (approximately 50m by 150m) developed in the late Silurian Cappanana Formation. The arch is 34m long, about 12-18m wide and 5m high, and 5-7m vertical cliffs occur above both entrances to the arch. Two through caves, containing patches of flowstone and Pleistocene fossil deposits, occur in the limestone above the level of the arch. The caves, Douglas and Burra, are older creek passages. Several other small caves and shelters also occur in the limestone.

== Condition ==
The condition of the buildings in the London Bridge complex has been described as fair to good. The buildings have previously been conserved to a high standard, although it is unclear how much work has been undertaken on them since 2002. The buildings have retained much of their original fabric.

London Bridge Arch is in good condition with some minor damage within the caves. Historic and recent visitor use has compacted some of the cave deposits and destroyed some surface fossils, and historic graffiti is evident within the Douglas and Burra caves. The surrounding landscape is mostly highly modified former pastoral country.

== Heritage listing ==
The Googong Foreshores Cultural and Geodiversity Heritage Area is an important heritage area because of its ability to demonstrate the region's pastoral, Aboriginal, geological and natural history, including through its archaeological deposits.

The place demonstrates a number of settlement and pastoral practices used in the area and wider region. The place and the buildings within it demonstrate past living conditions, rare nineteenth and early twentieth century historic building techniques and later evolution in building practice.

The London Bridge Arch and its associated cave deposits are also significant. The Arch is valued because of its ability to demonstrate karst processes. The Arch also provides insight into the evolution of the local natural landscape. The cave deposits provide further insight into past flora and fauna regimes of the area.

The London Bridge Arch and London Bridge Homestead building group are also valued for their aesthetic appeal appreciated by the local community.

Googong Foreshores was listed on the Australian Commonwealth Heritage List on 3 November 2017 having satisfied the following criteria.

Criterion A: Processes

The Googong Foreshores Cultural and Geodiversity Heritage area has important historic heritage value because of the place's ability to demonstrate aspects of the pastoral history of the Canberra and Queanbeyan region.

The features which express this value include, but are not limited to, the location of the homestead and associated farm buildings near to Burra Creek, the arrangement of the remnant farm buildings, their function and architecture including the building materials used and the demonstration of historic building methods. The buildings and the buildings within their surroundings demonstrate aspects of the living conditions experienced by the people living and working on the pastoral property.

The place also has significant heritage value for providing insight into the development of the local landscape as it demonstrates a naturally eroded limestone arch and caves formed at a meander bend, resulting in a meander cut-off and the eventual abandonment of a meander loop.

Features which express this value are the London Bridge Arch and associated caves, Burra Creek and the abandoned meander loop visible to the east of the arch.

Criterion B: Rarity

The Googong Foreshores Cultural and Geodiversity Heritage area has important heritage value because of the place's possession of rare aspects of the Canberra region's vernacular and rural architecture.

The features which express this value include, but are not limited to, the building fabric of the London Bridge Homestead and all associated rural buildings.

The place also has significant heritage value for the presence of a rare and unusual geological formation, London Bridge Arch and its associated caves.

Criterion C: Research

The Googong Foreshores Cultural and Geodiversity Heritage area has important research value because of the place's ability to provide information that will lead to a better understanding of the establishment and development of pastoral properties in the Canberra and Queanbeyan region. The buildings are also an important historic record. In part the place also represents pastoral practices implemented more widely beyond the immediate region.

Features which express this value include, but are not limited to, the built fabric of the place, the location, function and arrangement of rural buildings and their proximity to Burra Creek plus the place's demonstration of establishment processes such as land clearing, use of water, field and stock management.

The place also has significant heritage value for its ability to provide information that will lead to a wider understanding of Aboriginal use of the area over time. These archaeological values occur throughout the entire place.

The place also has significant heritage value due to its potential to provide additional information on the formation of the local landscape and the past flora and fauna assemblages of the Burra Creek Valley.

Features which express this value include, but are not limited to, the London Bridge Arch and caves incorporating rich Pleistocene cave deposits and fossil remains of large and small mammal species, some of which are locally extinct.

Criterion D: Characteristic values

The Googong Foreshores Cultural and Geodiversity Heritage area has significant heritage value for its importance in demonstrating the principal characteristics of cave formation in the local region due to karst processes.

Features which express this value are the London Bridge Arch and associated caves, Burra Creek and the abandoned meander loop visible to the east of the arch.

Criterion E: Aesthetic characteristics

The London Bridge Arch is a natural landmark valued by the local community.

Features which express this value include the dramatic form of the natural arch, its demonstration of geological processes and its association with Burra Creek, the small, natural river course flowing underneath. The presence of water is an important part of its aesthetic appeal.

The London Homestead group of buildings (excluding the shearer's quarters and woolshed) within its rural setting is valued by the local community for its picturesque quality. These aesthetic characteristics are best appreciated by homestead visitors walking in the area. Distant views and immediate views of the London Homestead group of buildings are important.

Features which express this value include, but are not limited to, distant and immediate views of the London Homestead group of buildings, the historic character of the homestead group of buildings, the vernacular building materials used and the presentation of these buildings within their wider rural setting.
