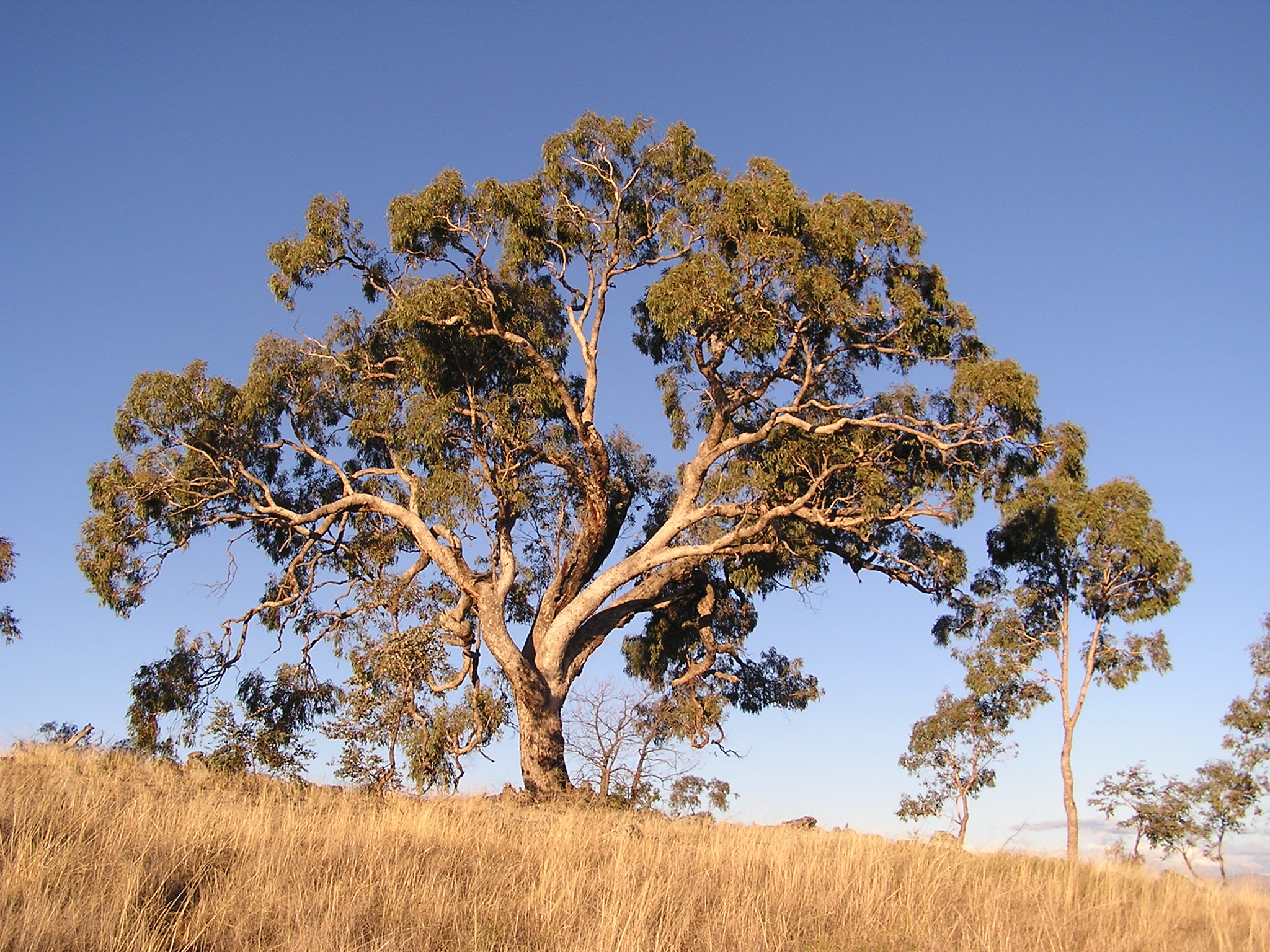
- Eucalyptus bridgesiana in the Australian Capital Territory

Conservation status
- Vulnerable (IUCN 3.1)

Scientific classification
- Kingdom: Plantae
- Clade: Tracheophytes
- Clade: Angiosperms
- Clade: Eudicots
- Clade: Rosids
- Order: Myrtales
- Family: Myrtaceae
- Genus: Eucalyptus
- Species: E. bridgesiana

Binomial name
- Eucalyptus bridgesiana R.T.Baker

= Eucalyptus bridgesiana =

Apple box

Species of eucalyptus

Eucalyptus bridgesiana, commonly known as apple box, apple, apple gum or but-but, is a medium to large sized tree native to eastern Australia. It has rough, fibrous bark on the trunk and larger branches, smooth grey bark above, glossy green, lance-shaped adult leaves, flower buds in groups of seven, white flowers and hemispherical fruit.

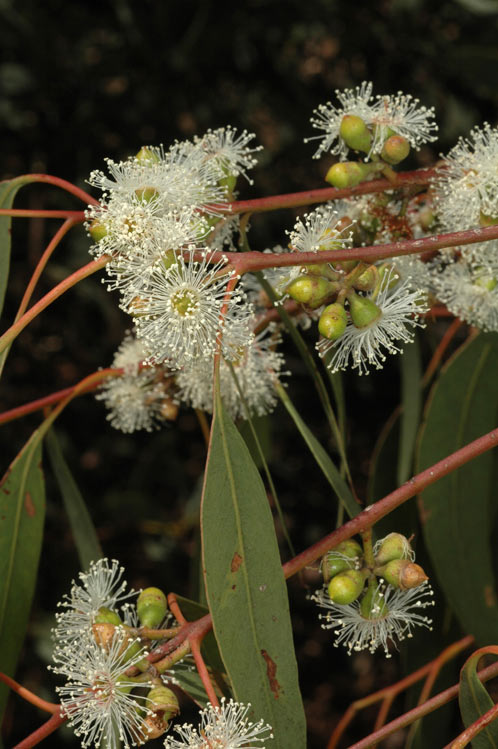
Flowers and buds

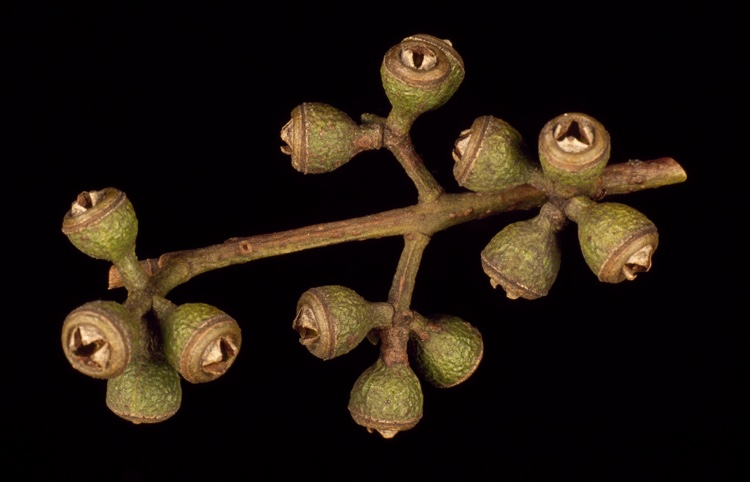
Fruit

== Description ==
Eucalyptus bridgesiana is a tree that typically grows to a height of 20 to 25 metres (66 to 82 ft) and forms a lignotuber. It has rough, fibrous, mottled grey and white, sometimes tessellated bark on the trunk and larger branches, with rough, grey, fibrous bark on its trunk and larger branches. Thinner branches have smooth grey bark with whitish patches, shed in short ribbons.

Young plants and coppice regrowth have sessile, egg-shaped, heart-shaped or almost round leaves arranged in opposite pairs, 25–100 mm (0.98–3.9 in) long, 20–80 mm (0.8–3 in) wide, with wavy edges and covered with a powdery white bloom. The adult leaves are lance-shaped, the same glossy green on both sides, 120–200 mm (4.7–7.9 in) long and 15–25 mm (0.6–1 in) wide on a petiole 12–35 mm (0.47–1.4 in) long. The flower buds are arranged in groups of seven on a peduncle up to 15 mm (0.6 in) long, the individual buds on a pedicel 1–5 mm (0.04–0.2 in) long.

Mature buds are normally oval, 5–8 mm (0.20–0.31 in) long and 3–5 mm (0.1–0.2 in) wide with a conical to beaked operculum. Flowering occurs from February to March and the flowers are white. The fruit is a woody, hemispherical capsule, 3–7 mm (0.12–0.28 in) long and 4–8 mm (0.16–0.31 in) wide with the three valves extending above the rim.

== Taxonomy and naming ==
Eucalyptus bridgesiana was first formally described in 1898 by Richard Thomas Baker and the description was published in Proceedings of the Linnean Society of New South Wales. The specific epithet (bridgesiana) honours Frederick Bridges (1840-1904) for his "promoting the opplication of economic science to our indigenous vegetable products".

== Distribution and habitat ==
Apple box grows in open woodland and forest and is widespread from near Stanthorpe in Queensland and south through the slopes and ranges of New South Wales and eastern Victoria.

The Sydney suburb of Tallawong, New South Wales is named after the Dharug word for apple box.

== Uses ==
The wood of apple box is softer than that of other eucalypts, and is considered poor for firewood or building timber. However, the honey produced by bees feeding on the small white flowers of the tree is of high quality.
