= Coonooer Bridge Wind Farm =

Wind farm in Victoria, Australia

- Country: Australia
- Coordinates: 36.4362°S 143.3616°E
- Status: Operational
- Construction began: 2015
- Commission date: 2016
- Owners: Eurus Energy, Windlab and the local community
- Operator: Windlab

Wind farm
- Type: Onshore

Power generation
- Units operational: 6
- Make and model: Vestas V117
- Nameplate capacity: 20 MW

External links
- Website: coonooerbridgewindfarm.com.au

Coonooer Bridge Wind Farm is a wind farm 90 km northwest of Bendigo in the Australian state of Victoria. Its output is contracted to supply the Australian Capital Territory via the National Electricity Market at $81.50 per megawatt hour.

The site is jointly owned by Eurus Energy, Windlab and the local community. It was the first commercial wind farm in Australia to have the local community included in the ownership in this way.
