= Frederick Bridges =

(1840–1904) educationist

Frederick Bridges (1840–1904) was an Australian educationalist and former chief inspector of schools.

== Early life ==
Born in Windsor, New South Wales on 2 February 1840, Bridges was brought to Sydney as an infant. He was the son of a Scottish-born stonemason brought to Sydney by John Dunmore Lang and his wife. He was educated at the Fort Street Model School and was one of its first pupils.

== Educationalist work ==
Bridges became the first pupil-teacher trained by the Board of National Education who was a man. He began to work for the Board in 1852 and after four years became an assistant in Sydney schools. He became the headmaster of Balmain Public School in 1861, of Mudgee High School in 1863, of Cleveland Street Intensive English High School in 1865, and of Fort Street Model School in 1867. He remained at the last of these until his appointment as a school inspector in 1876. He was the inspector of schools in Wellington and Bathurst. In 1884, he became the deputy chief inspector; in 1889, superintendent of technical education; in 1894, chief inspector of schools and under-secretary in 1903.

During his tenure, state aid for religious schools was revoked, the education system became more centralised, and state provision was given to secondary and technical education. Although involved in these branches, Bridges was mainly focused on public elementary education.

At a conference in April 1904 discussing a report made by Sir George Handley Knibbs and J. W. Turner on the educational system, he opposed several resolutions which were designed to replace the pupil-teacher system with one of pre-service teacher education; however, this was passed without consent among conference voters.

== Death ==
On 16 November 1904, Bridges died of diabetes. His funeral was attended by many in the profession and a memorial was later erected in his honour in Gore Hill Cemetery.

== See also ==
- Eucalyptus bridgesiana, named after Bridges
- Arthur Bridges, son of Frederick
