= Royalla =

- Suburb
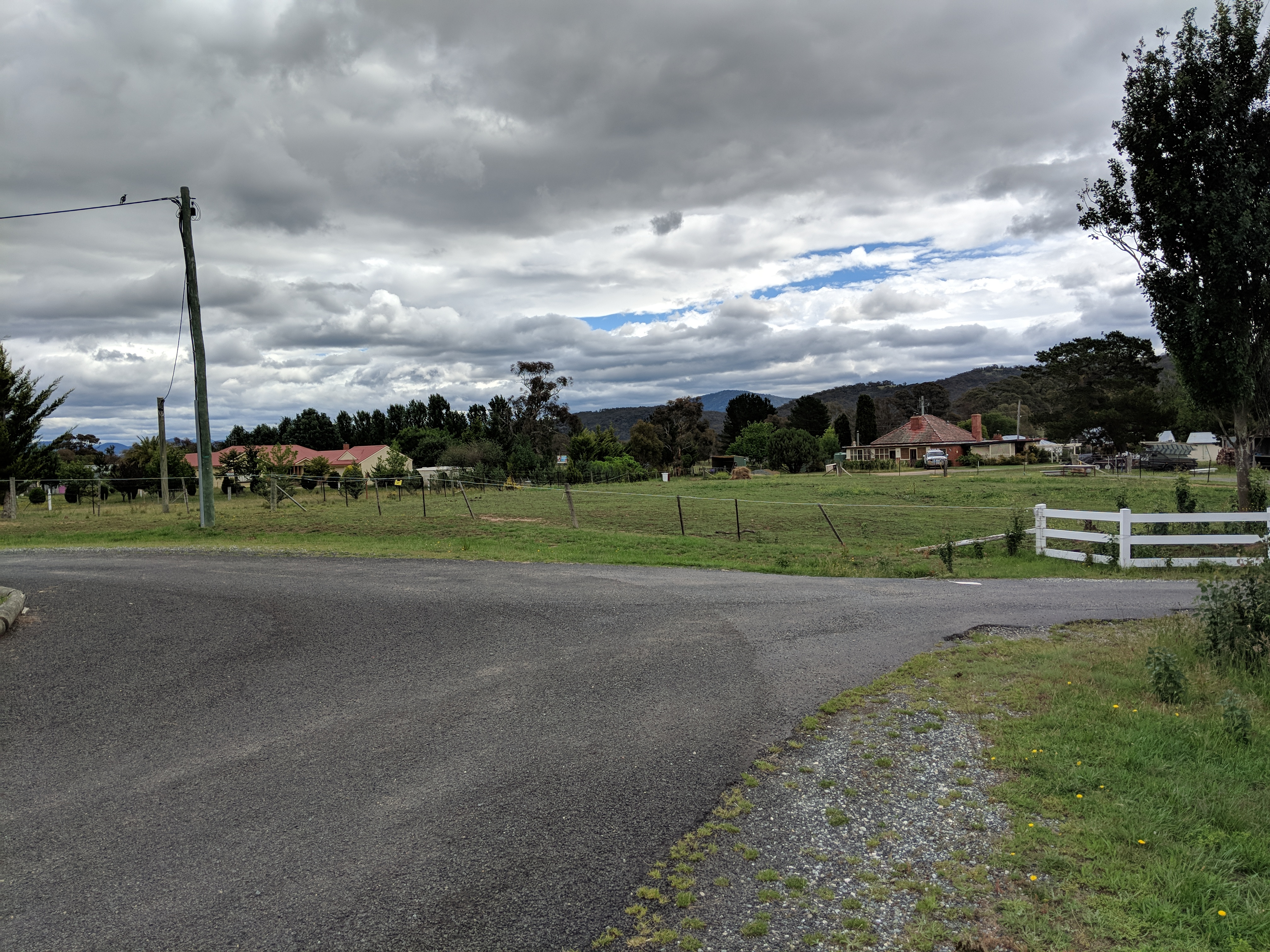
- Royalla

- Interactive map of Royalla
- Coordinates: 35°30′25″S 149°10′05″E
- Country: Australia
- State: New South Wales
- City: Queanbeyan
- LGA: Queanbeyan-Palerang Regional Council
- Location: 315 km (196 mi) SW of Sydney; 28 km (17 mi) S of Canberra; 13 km (8.1 mi) SW of Queanbeyan; 89 km (55 mi) N of Cooma

Government
  - State electorate: Monaro
  - Federal divisions: Bean; Eden-Monaro
- Elevation: 800 m (2,600 ft)

Population
  - Total: 1,063 (SAL 2021)
- Postcode: 2620
Suburbs around Royalla
Theodore	Tralee	Googong
	Royalla	Burra
	Williamsdale	Burra

Royalla is a rural locality on the border of New South Wales and the Australian Capital Territory in Australia. The area takes its name from the nearby Mount Rob Roy, and was originally a railway settlement on the Bombala railway line known as Rob Roy and changed to the current name in 1905. Modern Royalla is a large rural locality east of the Monaro Highway. The border with the ACT follows the western boundary of the easement of the former railway line to the east of the highway. The town was served by a railway station until 1975. The NSW part of Royalla had a population of 984 at the 2016 census.

== Australian Capital Territory ==
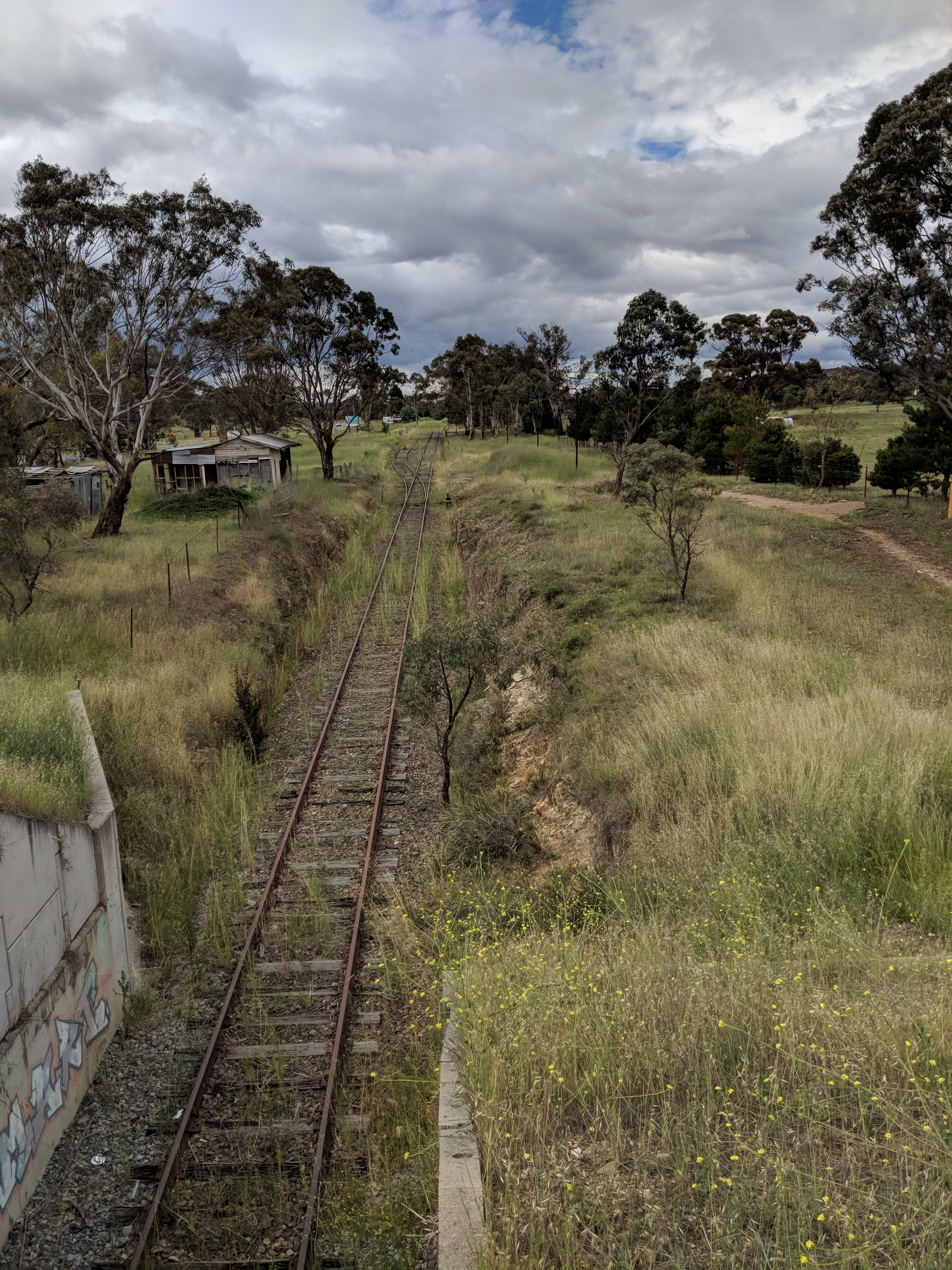
Site of Royalla railway station on Bombala railway line

The adjoining part of the Australian Capital Territory is also known as Royalla. The part of Royalla within the ACT is included in the area called "Tuggeranong (SA2)" by the ABS, which also includes the ACT part of Williamsdale and all the rural territory between the Murrumbidgee River and the NSW border. It had a population of 43 at the 2021 census.

=== Solar farm ===
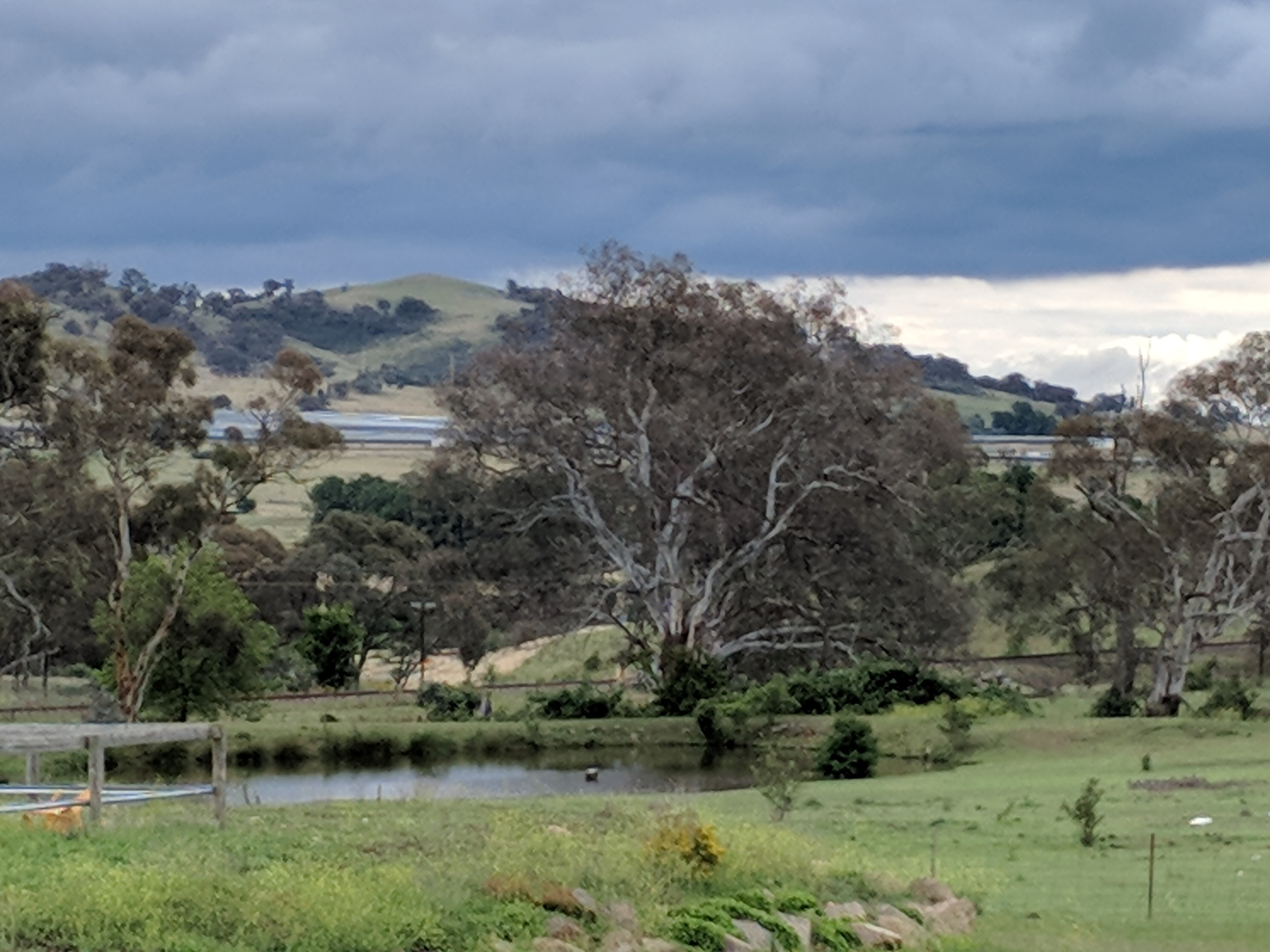
Royalla solar farm in the distance

On 3 September 2014, Australia's then-largest solar farm was officially opened there. The event was attended by Simon Corbell, the ACT's Minister for the Environment and Sustainable Development, and Jose Manuel Garcia-Margallo, Spain's Minister of Foreign Affairs and Cooperation. The plant features 83,000 solar arrays, and is rated at 20MWp. It has the capacity to power more than 4,500 ACT homes. The farm was developed by the Spanish company Fotowatio Renewable Ventures (FRV).
