= Fernleigh, New South Wales =

Fernleigh
- Town
- Coordinates: 28°45′54″S 153°30′4″E
- Country: Australia
- State: New South Wales
- LGA: Ballina Shire

Government
  - State electorate: Ballina
  - Federal division: Richmond

Population
  - Total: 298 (2021 census)
- Postcode: 2479

Fernleigh is a locality in the Ballina Shire of New South Wales, Australia.

== Demographics ==
As of the 2021 Australian census, 298 people resided in Fernleigh, up from 297 in the 2016 census. The median age of persons in Fernleigh was 50 years. There were more males than females, with 52.5% of the population male and 47.5% female. The average household size was 2.8 people per household.
