= Queanbeyan District Hospital =

- Southern New South Wales Local Health District
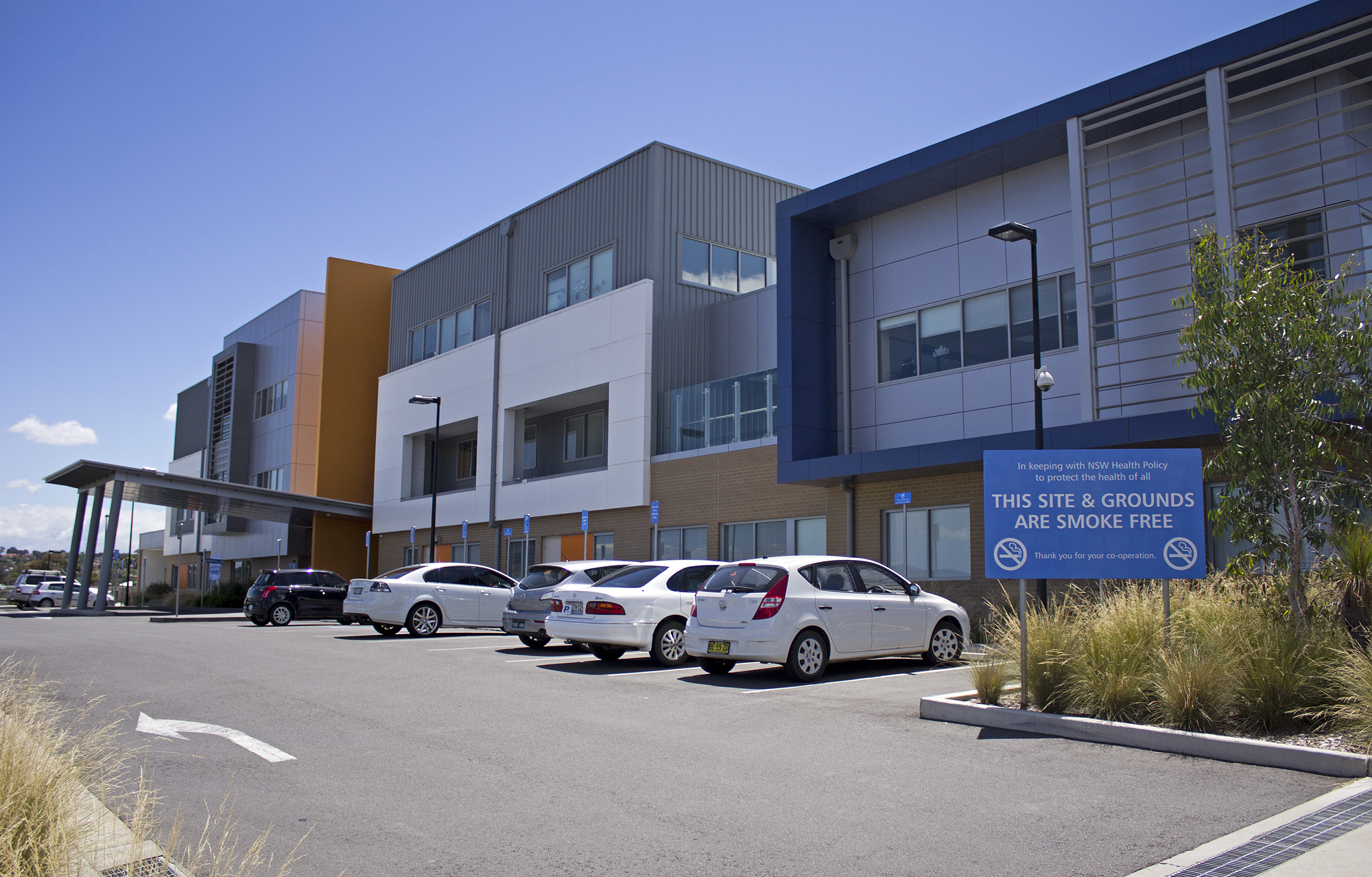
- The new Queanbeyan District Hospital from Collett Street

Geography
- Location: Queanbeyan, New South Wales, Australia
- Coordinates: type:hospital 35°20′51″S 149°13′56″E

Organisation
- Care system: Public Medicare (AU)
- Type: District

Services
- Emergency department: Yes
- Beds: 55

History
- Founded: 1847

Links
- Lists: Hospitals in Australia

Queanbeyan District Hospital is an acute care public hospital servicing the City of Queanbeyan in New South Wales, Australia. The hospital is located on the corner of Erin and Collett streets and is operated by the Southern New South Wales Local Health District. The facility incorporates general medical, surgical and specialist services. A major $51 million redevelopment of the facility was completed in 2009, including construction of a modern 10,400 m^{2} (112,000 ft^{2}) main hospital building.

== Services ==
The hospital's 24-hour emergency department is equipped with 16 beds catering for adults and children. A paediatric treatment and observation unit and maternity ward are also provided at Queanbeyan District Hospital. The major referral hospital for the region is The Canberra Hospital which receives patients unable to be treated at Queanbeyan.

In addition to general and surgical wards, the hospital is equipped with three operating theatres. There has been criticism over the underutilisation of these facilities following the redevelopment works, however the New South Wales Government maintains that this is because the hospital has been designed to accommodate regional growth. In addition to obstetrics, specialist care provided by the hospital includes a mental health unit, an overnight stay aged care unit, diagnostic services such as pathology and medical imaging as well as a pharmacy. Dental and allied health services can also be accessed at Queanbeyan District Hospital, with many providers at the hospital operating in conjunction with the ACT Government Health Directorate due to the hospital's close proximity to the Australian Capital Territory. A Renal Dialysis Unit was established and opened in January 2014. This 8 chair facility caters to 24 Dialysis patients and is under the guidance of the Canberra Hospital Renal team.

== History ==
The Queanbeyan District Hospital was established in 1847 by a local Benevolent Society, operating out of a temporary rented homestead. Designed by architect W.H. Downey in 1859, the purpose built Rusten House was completed in 1861 and named in honour of Mary Ann Rusten, the institution's first matron. The facility could accommodate 16 patients, in separate male and female wards and began receiving government subsidy in 1865.

Prior to the establishment of Royal Canberra Hospital in 1914, Queanbeyan Hospital was the hub for medical services in the Monaro region, and the newly formed Federal Capital Territory still relied in the hospital for services such as obstetrics. The hospital moved into a new building in 1933 with provision for 25 beds, an operating theatre and an isolation unit. Rusten House remained in use as an ancillary building from 1933-2007, and is listed on the New South Wales heritage register.

The main hospital building was extended in 1964 and 1978 and had grown to a 42 bed facility before a major redevelopment of the site was undertaken beginning in 2006. Many of the existing buildings, including the 1933 structure were demolished to make way for the new four story hospital building, completed in 2009.

== Statistics ==
Figures published on the Australian Government's My Hospital website for the 2011-2012 financial year, Queanbeyan District Hospital performed 747 elective surgeries. Waiting times for elective surgeries at Queanbeyan were not compared to other hospitals, but performed 96% of urgent procedures within clinically recommended timeframes. The hospital's 2010 operating budget was $21.07 million.
