= Byrnes Mill and Millhouse =

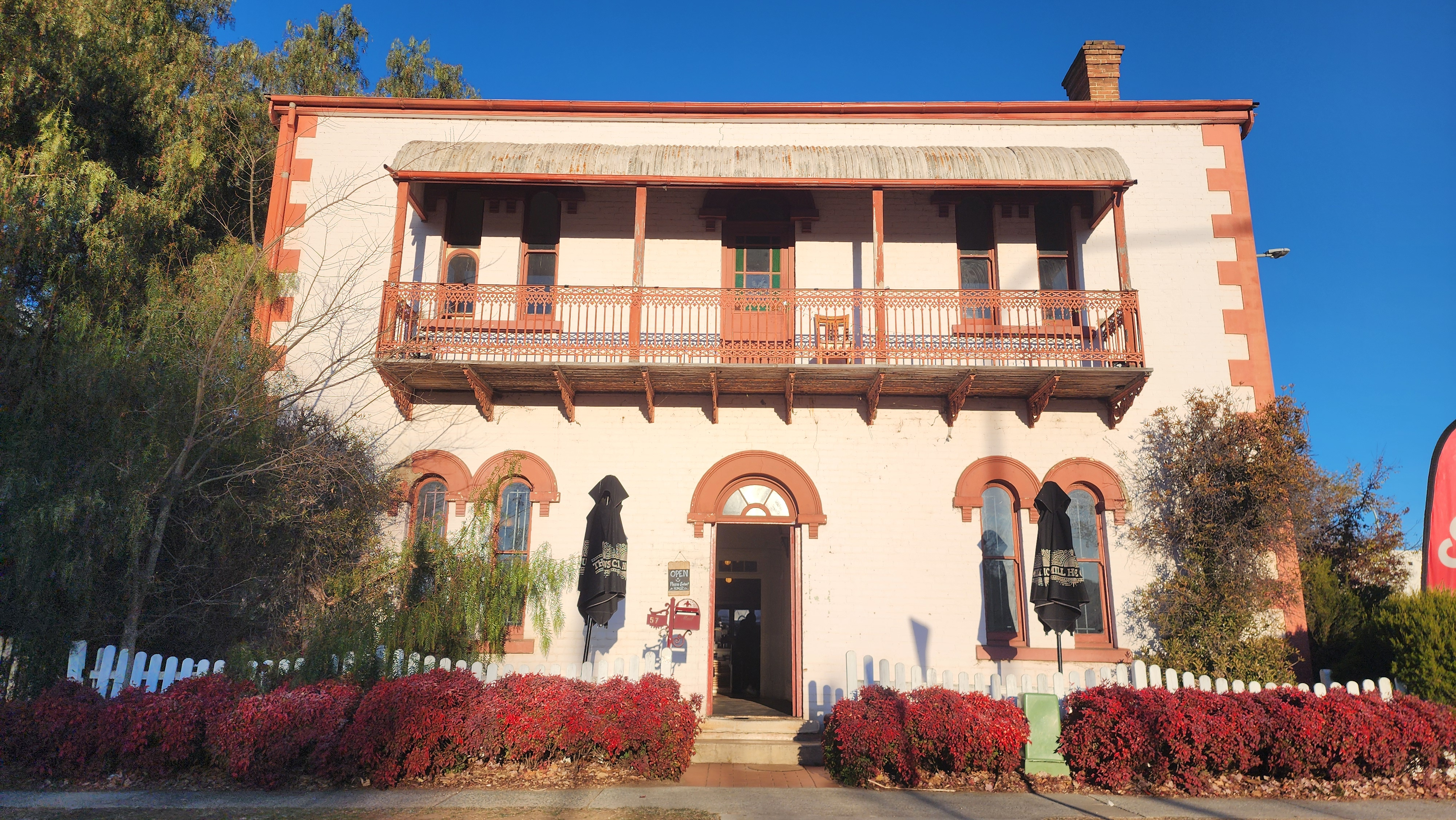
- Byrnes Mill and Millhouse, 2018

- Location within New South Wales Location within Australia
- 35.3509°S 149.2351°E
- Location: Morrisett Street, Queanbeyan, Queanbeyan-Palerang Region, New South Wales, Australia

New South Wales Heritage Register
- Official name: Mill and Millhouse; Byrnes Mill
- Type: State heritage (built)
- Designated: 2 April 1999
- Reference no.: 363
- Type: Mill (Grain) - Corn
- Category: Manufacturing and Processing

Byrnes Mill and Millhouse is a heritage-listed former flour mill and residence at Morrisett Street, Queanbeyan, in the Southern Tablelands region of New South Wales, Australia. It was added to the New South Wales State Heritage Register on 2 April 1999.

== History ==
The mill was built for Martin Byrne, who was a prominent landowner, hotelier and businessman in Queanbeyan. Byrne had nursed the idea of establishing a mill since 1870, but it was not until 1883 that he made a start. He let the building contract to an experienced Sydney mill builder, William Crispin, who in turn subcontracted much of the work to local builders Thomas Jordan and Thomas McCauley. Crispin would have designed the mill and supervised its construction, while Jordan and McCauley carried out the actual building work. The building, constructed of brick laid in English bond, was completed in September 1883 at a cost of 3,500 pounds. It was originally equipped with a fifteen-horsepower engine and three pairs of elevators, while a freestanding smokestack 60 feet (18.3 m) high stood beside the building.

Operations began in December 1883, with the mill's two employees soon producing forty bags of flour per day. Martin's son, James, managed the mill, while he and his family lived next door in the two-storey mill house which had been built at the same time as the mill. With the arrival of the railway in Queanbeyan in 1887, cheaper Sydney flour became available in the town. Two years later, construction commenced of another mill near the new railway station in Oaks Estate. Realising that he could no longer compete, Byrne closed the mill down in 1889 and put it up for sale. It was subsequently used for many years and by different people as a store for farm produce. At some point, it was bought by J. B. Young's and used for storage. It was used for a restaurant in the 2000s, but this has since closed.

James Byrne continued to live in the mill house until his wife's death in August 1902. The mill house was then occupied as a residence by William Hill, by Reginald Tetley in the period 1937-52 and by Archibald Campbell of Lanyon. It then passed to J. B. Young's and was used by the company as a residence for its employees. From the early 1980s, the building housed craft stores and a bookshop and returned to being a residence for a period. It now houses the Millhouse Cafe.

== Description ==
Byrne's Mill was one of six to have operated in the Canberra-Queanbeyan district at different times. The mill building is a three-storey brick structure with a corrugated steel gable roof. Window heads (of brick) are slightly rounded and there is a hoist and door to the top storey. High up in the gable ends of the building are what appear to be attic windows.

The mill house or former manager's house is a two-storey brick building with a corrugated steel roof. The roof is a gable with a skillion to the rear. Decoration includes rendered quoins and well crafted gothic bargeboards. The front of the building features a cantilevered balcony to the upper floor, complete with filigree work and a convex iron roof. Windows to this front facade are round arched with label moulds and there is a fanlight over the front door.

The mill and mill house were identified as places to be kept by all three community workshops organised by the AHC in Queanbeyan in 1990 to investigate social significance, local significance and a community's sense of place.

== Heritage listing ==
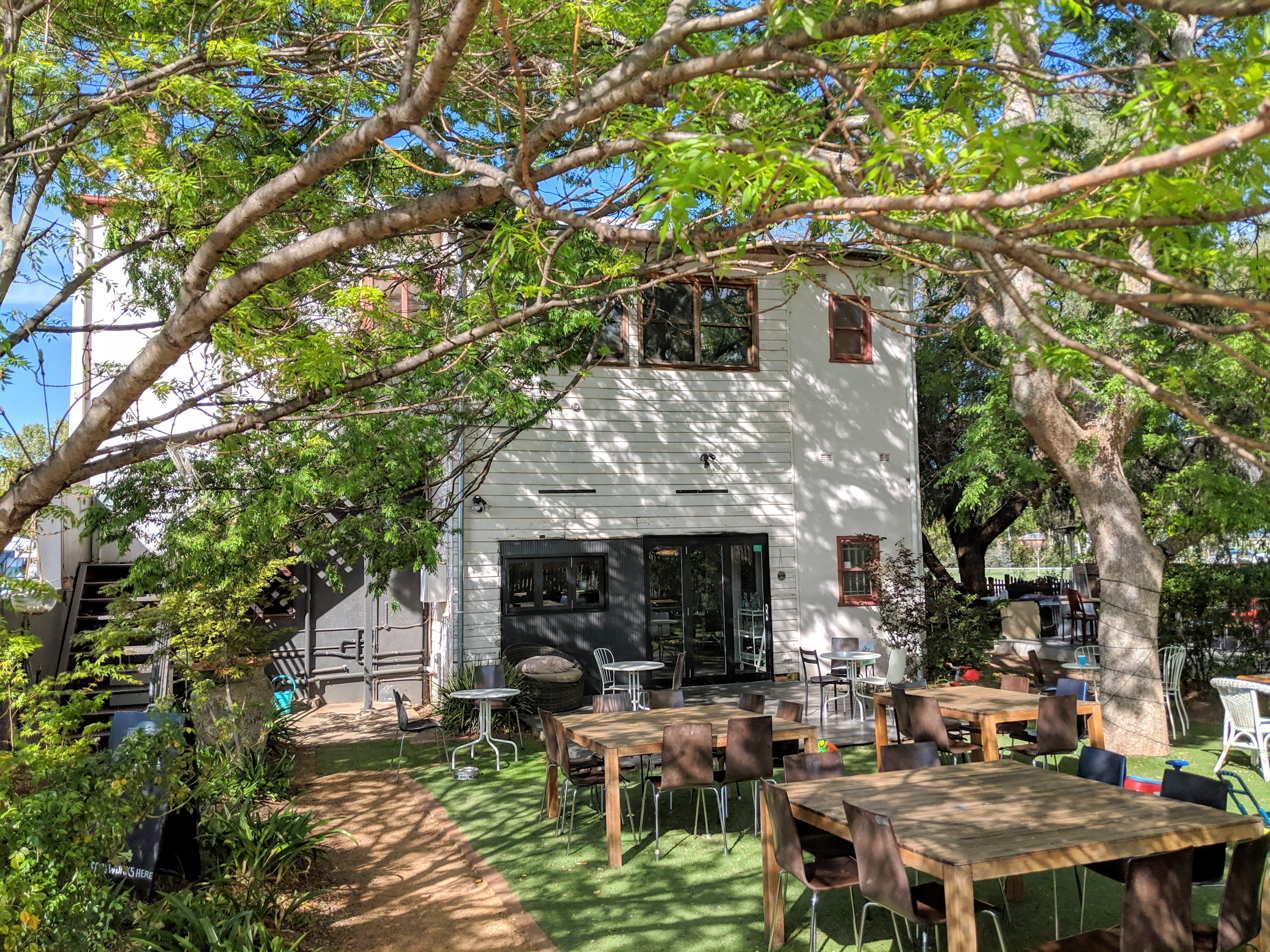
Rear view, 2018

Byrne's Mill is very significant as the sole surviving mill building in the Canberra-Queanbeyan district, at least six other mills having functioned in the area at various times. The building, together with the adjacent millhouse, is also the only substantially intact nineteenth-century industrial site in Queanbeyan. The mill and millhouse are significant in demonstrating the adverse effects that the coming of rail services exerted on the majority of manufacturing industries in rural centres. The mill, owing to its massing, general design and the form of its openings, is a good example of a late nineteenth-century flour mill. The two buildings form part of an important remnant nineteenth-century streetscape in Collett Street, linking with another nineteenth-century building, Hibernia Lodge, situated further north along the street

Byrnes Mill and Millhouse was listed on the New South Wales State Heritage Register on 2 April 1999.
