= Kawaree =

- Location within New South Wales Location within Australia
- 35.3559°S 149.2265°E
- Location: 3 Tharwa Road, Queanbeyan, New South Wales, Australia

History
- Built: 1886–1889

Site notes
- Owner: Mount Warrigal Retirement Village Ltd

New South Wales Heritage Register
- Official name: Kawaree; Aged persons home
- Type: state heritage (complex / group)
- Designated: 2 April 1999
- Reference no.: 365
- Type: Villa
- Category: Residential buildings (private)

Kawaree is a heritage-listed former residence and parsonage at 3 Tharwa Road, Queanbeyan, New South Wales, Australia. It was built from 1886 to 1889. The property is owned by Mount Warrigal Retirement Village Ltd. It now forms part of the Warrigal Community Village Queanbeyan aged care facility, in which it is used as a community space.

== History ==
While searching for the Murrumbidgee River in 1820, Joseph Wild, James Vaughan and Charles Throsby Smith came upon two small streams forming a single river winding through a valley at the eastern end of the Limestone Plains. These were later named the Molonglo River and the Queanbeyan River.

The first non-Aboriginal use of land at Queanbeyan was by an unauthorised occupant, Timothy Beard, who called his property "Quinbean" which is thought to be an Aboriginal word for "clear water". This gave the city its modern name, Queanbeyan.

The area became a natural stop for travellers crossing into the Monaro and by 1824, prospective settlers were establishing "stock stations" around the region. With this came an increase in population in the 1830s, and by 1836, a post office was established and a court house followed in 1837. Queanbeyan was formally proclaimed as a settlement on 28 September 1838.

The site of Kawareee is on part of portion 35 of the Parish of Queanbeyan and was purchased by Robert Campbell in 5/1836. Campbell was a merchant, pastoralist, politician and philanthropist born in Greenock, Scotland in 1769 and who arrived in Sydney in 1798. With the permission of the Governor of New South Wales, he established the Campbell's Wharf at Circular Quay. In compensation for the loss of his ship Sydney while it was on government service, he was awarded compensation in the form of a land grant at Limestone Plains in 1824 which he took up in 1825. He renamed his original grant Duntroon after Duntrune Castle, the hereditary home of the Campbells (clan) in Scotland.

Through the next decade Campbell amassed vast landholdings on the Limestone Plains and elsewhere in NSW. Before he died on 15 April 1846, Campbell divided his holdings between his six children. His son George Campbell conveyed five ares to James Brown of Googong, Queanbeyan in 1854. On his death in 1883, Brown's daughter Eliza Richardson inherited the land. She sold two acres two roods to local solicitor Earnest Edward (E.E.) Morgan of Queanbeyan in February 1886. This land formed part of the area known as "Garryowen" (bounded by Uriarra Road, Stornaway Street, Tharwa Road and Campbell Street) which was subdivided in the 1850s into small landholdings of 10-20 acres to the west of the town grid and was fully occupied by 1860.

Kawaree Cottage was built by E. E. Morgan between 1886 and 1889 on the block which according to Sheedy, formed the extremity of the southern boundary of Garryowen, the block which was previously owned by James Brown of Googong.

The house is of a late Victorian style, built at a time of great growth in the Southern NSW regional areas. There is no documented evidence of any garden design for the period between the house's completion in 1889 and 1921 when the property was first rented, to 1924 when the Colmans became its owners. The Kawaree landscape was initially developed over 70 years through the gold rush of the 1880s, the depression of the 1890s, Federation, the 1920s, the Great Depression of the 1930s, World War II and was finalised in the optimism of post-war Australia.

In 1892 the property was sold to the trustees of the Wesleyan Methodist Church for use as a parsonage (for Queanbeyan). The manse was lived in by Methodist Ministers continuously for 30 years, but due to the distance being too far from the church, the Methodist Church sold the property to a parishioner, Herbert George (H. G.) Colman, in 1924.

Colman came from Blayney to work for James Buchanan Young, who had migrated to Australia in 1885, moved to Blayney and then to Queanbeyan in 1914, where he purchased Harry Solomon's store in Monaro Street and changed its name to JB Young's department store. Colman was the store's manager. He was responsible for the rapid expansion of JB Young's, which purchased the first lease offered for sale in Canberra in December 1924, as the fledgling Federal Capital began to expand. A branch store was built in what was then called Eastlake and is now Kingston, Canberra's first suburb and shopping precinct. The store opened in July 1925. After the expansion into Canberra, the business began to grow rapidly and H. G. Colman and two other directors, bought out JB Young. The store saw expansion into (Canberra's suburb) Civic, which opened in September 1932 and in other regional centres until JB Young's landholdings was bought out by Grace Bros and closed by the early 1980s. Later Grace Brothers was bought out by Myer in 1985 and many of its stores closed.

Kawaree, at the time the Colmans lived there, had open horse paddocks, chicken runs, vegetable gardens and fruit orchards. Through the depression, money was scarce as Colman had suffered a financial setback, and, as most did, they relied on produce from their own garden and assets to make ends meet. For their children, George, his brother Jim and sister Biddie, life was an adventure but it was also tough and like so many in the district, they made do with whatever was to hand. Horse and sulky took the children to school (at Telopea Park School), in Barton. Open space was a vital part of the Kawaree way of life, providing as it did for the transport and dietary needs of its occupants. Colman and his wife lived there until their deaths in 1959. In all the family lived there from 1920 to 1962, when George and James Colman, their sons and executors of H. G.'s will, sold it to Queanbeyan solicitor, Robert Allport and his wife Margaret. The property was converted to Torrens Title in 1969/70.

The Colmans were avid gardeners and highly regarded for their wide variety of roses, also for the range of flowers, shrubs and conifers which filled the abundant garden spaces. The overflowing house gardens framed the lawns and serpentine carriage loop, typical of the Arts & Crafts (interwar) period, whilst the picket fence was a remnant of an earlier time and is evidence of the Late Victorian garden style. Photographic evidence suggests the garden was structurally in place when the first images were taken in 1924, and the style is reflective of both Late Victorian and early 20th century garden (styles). Although the picket fence and formal entry are evident in gardens from the Victorian and Late Victorian eras, the remaining elements indicate other influences which were more reflective of the Federation and Picturesque ideals of the new century, tempered with plant choices resilient to drought (hardy species of roses, conifers and perennials. The extent of the garden is a display of the optimism of the period prior to the (Great) depression of 1929.

Colman went on to develop one of regional NSW's largest chains of department stores, including JB Young's, Fosseys and Owl Supermarkets.

The Allport family lived in Kawaree until they sold it to John Fisher's company Rynkite P/L in 1987, which began construction of the Kawaree Village Aged Care Facility within its broader gardens and property.

Since the development of an aged care facility on Kawaree during the late 1980s the landscape has undergone significant changes to accommodate a number of residential buildings, with the original Kawaree (house) building extended and modified for use as the facility residents' community centre. Through these changes there are a number of extant features that derive from the original Kawaree garden setting (that remain).

In 1988 a permanent conservation order under the NSW Heritage Act was made on Kawaree. This was replaced by Kawaree's listing on the NSW State Heritage Register in 1999. In 1991 Kawaree was listed on the Queanbeyan Local Environmental Plan, which lapsed and was replaced by the 1998 LEP listing. This was subsequently updated in 1999 and again in 2007, after a local heritage study.

== Description ==
Much change has occurred to Kawaree's landscape since 1987's construction of the Kawaree Retirement Village and subsequent expansion of that with an Aged Care Facility.

Kawaree, at the time the Colmans lived there, had open horse paddocks, chicken runs, vegetable gardens and fruit orchards. Open space was a vital part of the Kawaree way of life, providing as it did for the transport and dietary needs of its occupants. Colman and his wife lived there until their deaths in 1959.

Grounds

The Kawaree landscape was initially developed over 70 years through the gold rush of the 1880s, the depression of the 1890s, Federation, the 1920s, the Great Depression of the 1930s, World War 2 and was finalised in the optimism of post-war Australia.

The property was a large block on the edge of (i.e. outside the) Queanbeyan's town grid, basically a semi-rural villa estate.

The serpentine carriage drive and loop before the house was reflective of Victorian estate planning - it was converted into a driveway in the Inter-war period with flanking garden reflecting that era of garden style.

Garden

There is no documented evidence of any garden design for the period between the house's completion in 1889 and 1921 when the property was first rented, to 1924 when the Colmans became its owners.

The picket fence and gate towards the house reflect Late Victorian era garden detail that remains.

The overflowing house gardens (beds) which framed the lawns and serpentine carriage loop were typical of Arts & Crafts (interwar) period.

The Colmans (here from 1921, renting (and owning from 1924)) were avid gardeners and highly regarded for their wide variety of roses, also for the range of flowers, shrubs and conifers which filled the abundant garden spaces. The overflowing house gardens framed the lawns and serpentine carriage loop, typical of the Arts & Crafts (interwar) period, whilst the picket fence was a remnant of an earlier time and is evidence of the Late Victorian garden style. Photographic evidence suggests the garden was structurally in place when the first images were taken in 1924, and the style is reflective of both Late Victorian and early 20th century garden (styles). Although the picket fence and formal entry are evident in gardens from the Victorian and Late Victorian eras, the remaining elements indicate other influences which were more reflective of the Federation and Picturesque ideals of the new century, tempered with plant choices resilient to drought (hardy species of roses, conifers and perennials. The extent of the garden is a display of the optimism of the period prior to the (Great) depression of 1929.

House

The house is of a late Victorian style, built at a time of great growth in the Southern NSW regional areas. In the late 1980s it was converted into, extended and modified for use as the community facility as part of estate changes to create the Kawaree Retirement Village.

== Heritage listing ==
Kawaree was listed on the New South Wales State Heritage Register on 2 April 1999.
