= Queanbeyan =

City in New South Wales, Australia

- City
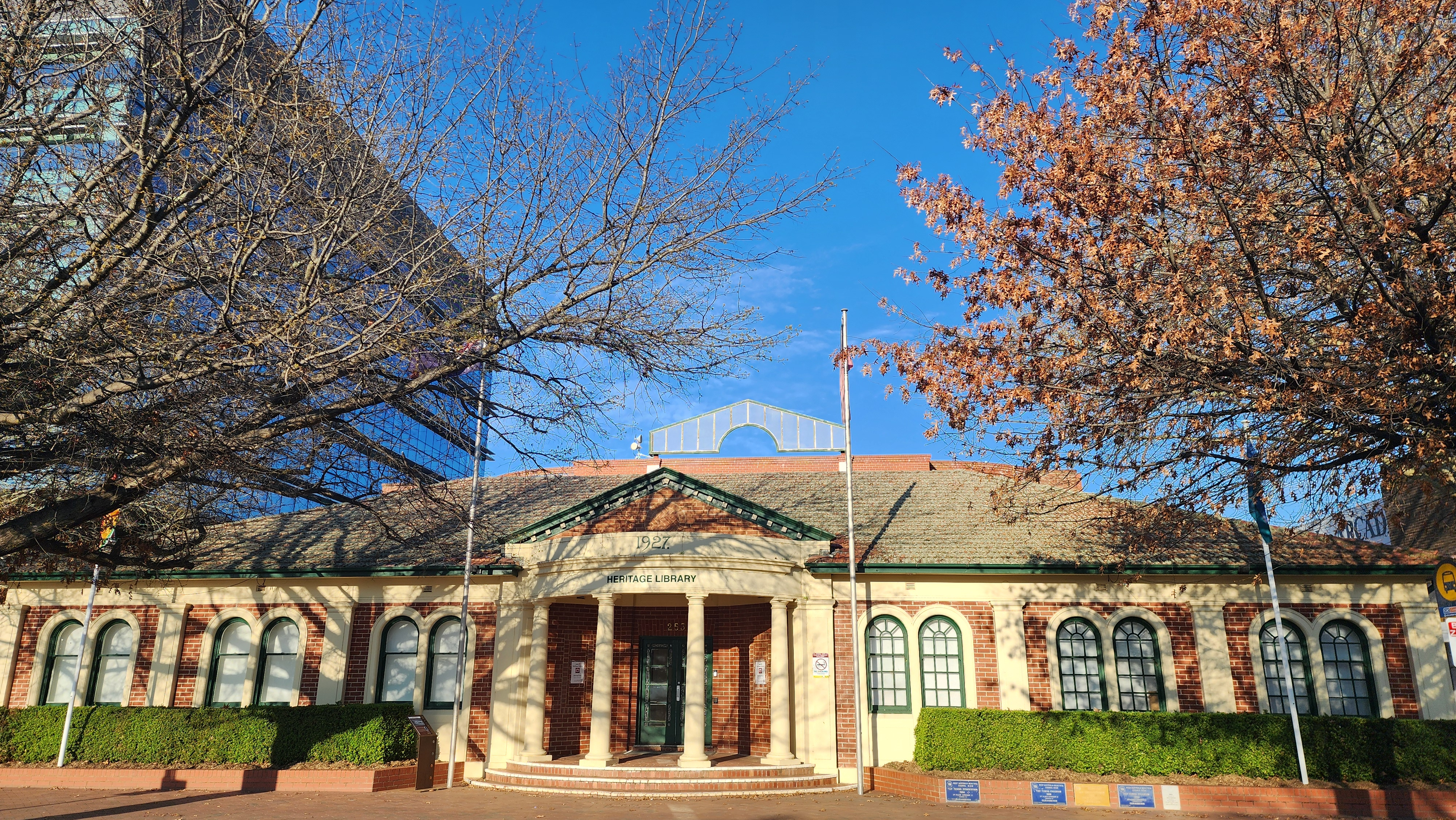
- Frank Pangallo Heritage Library

- Flag Coat of arms

- Coordinates: 35°21′12″S 149°14′03″E
- Country: Australia
- State: New South Wales
- LGA: Queanbeyan–Palerang Regional Council
- Location: 14.9 km (9.3 mi) SE of Canberra; 272 km (169 mi) SW of Sydney; 135 km (84 mi) NW of Batemans Bay
- Established: 1838

Government
  - State electorate: Monaro
  - Federal division: Eden-Monaro

Area
  - Total: 173 km^{2} (67 sq mi)
- Elevation: 576 m (1,890 ft)

Population
  - Total: 37,511 (2021 census)
  - Density: 210/km^{2} (540/sq mi)
- Time zone: UTC+10:00 (AEST)
  - Summer (DST): UTC+11:00 (AEDT)
- Postcode: 2620
- County: Murray
- Parish: Queanbeyan
- Mean max temp: 20.6 °C (69.1 °F)
- Mean min temp: 6.5 °C (43.7 °F)
- Annual rainfall: 593.8 mm (23.38 in)
Localities around Queanbeyan
Beard	Oaks Estate	Queanbeyan East
Crestwood	Queanbeyan	Queanbeyan East
Queanbeyan West	Karabar	Greenleigh

Queanbeyan (/ˈkwiːnbiən/ KWEEN-bee-ən) is a city in south-eastern New South Wales, Australia, located adjacent to the Australian Capital Territory in the Southern Tablelands region. Located on the Queanbeyan River, the city is the council seat of the Queanbeyan-Palerang Regional Council. At the 2021 census, the Queanbeyan part of the Canberra–Queanbeyan built-up area had a population of 37,511.

Queanbeyan's economy is based on light construction, manufacturing, service, retail and agriculture. Canberra, Australia's capital, is located 15 kilometres (9 miles) to the west, and Queanbeyan is a commuter town. The word Queanbeyan is the anglicised form of Quinbean or *Kuwinbiyan, a Ngarigo word meaning "clear waters".

== History ==
The first inhabitants of Queanbeyan were the Ngambri peoples of the Walgalu Nation.

The town grew from a squattage held by ex-convict and inn keeper, Timothy Beard, on the banks of the Molonglo River in what is now Oaks Estate. The town centre of Queanbeyan is located on the Queanbeyan River, a tributary of the Molonglo River and approximately 1.4 kilometres (0.87 mi) south-southeast of Oaks Estate.

Queanbeyan was officially proclaimed a township in 1838 when the population was about 50. The local parish was also known by that name and later still the member for the electorate of Queanbeyan held a seat in the legislative assembly of the colony of NSW. On 28 November 1837 the Colonial Secretary announced the appointment of Captain Alured Tasker Faunce as resident police magistrate at Queanbeyan. His homestead, called Dodsworth, was situated on the banks of the Queanbeyan river opposite the town. The town plan was laid out by surveyor James Larmer, in 1838.

Traces of gold were discovered in 1851 and lead and silver mines also flourished briefly. Settlers were harassed by bushrangers, of which James Shaw, William Millet, and John Rueben, John Tennant, Jacky Jacky, Frank Gardiner and Ben Hall were some of the more notorious. In 1836, a Post Office was established.

The Commercial Banking Company of Sydney Limited (CBC, now part of the National Australia Bank) opened in Queanbeyan on 19 September 1859. The Bank of New South Wales began service in Queanbeyan in 1878. The Golden Age (now The Queanbeyan Age) was Queanbeyan's first newspaper and was founded in 1860 by John Gale. In 1880 the residence of John James Wright, the first mayor of Queanbeyan, was constructed along the edge of the Queanbeyan River. In 1982 that building became the Queanbeyan Art Centre.

The Salvation Army claimed an outpost in Queanbeyan in 1884.

Queanbeyan became an increasingly successful primary producing district, and was proclaimed a Municipality in February 1885 incorporating an area of 5,700 acres (23 km^{2}). The railway reached Queanbeyan railway station in 1887 and it became the junction for the lines going to Canberra and Bombala. The town is served by the thrice-daily NSW TrainLink Xplorer service between Canberra and Sydney.

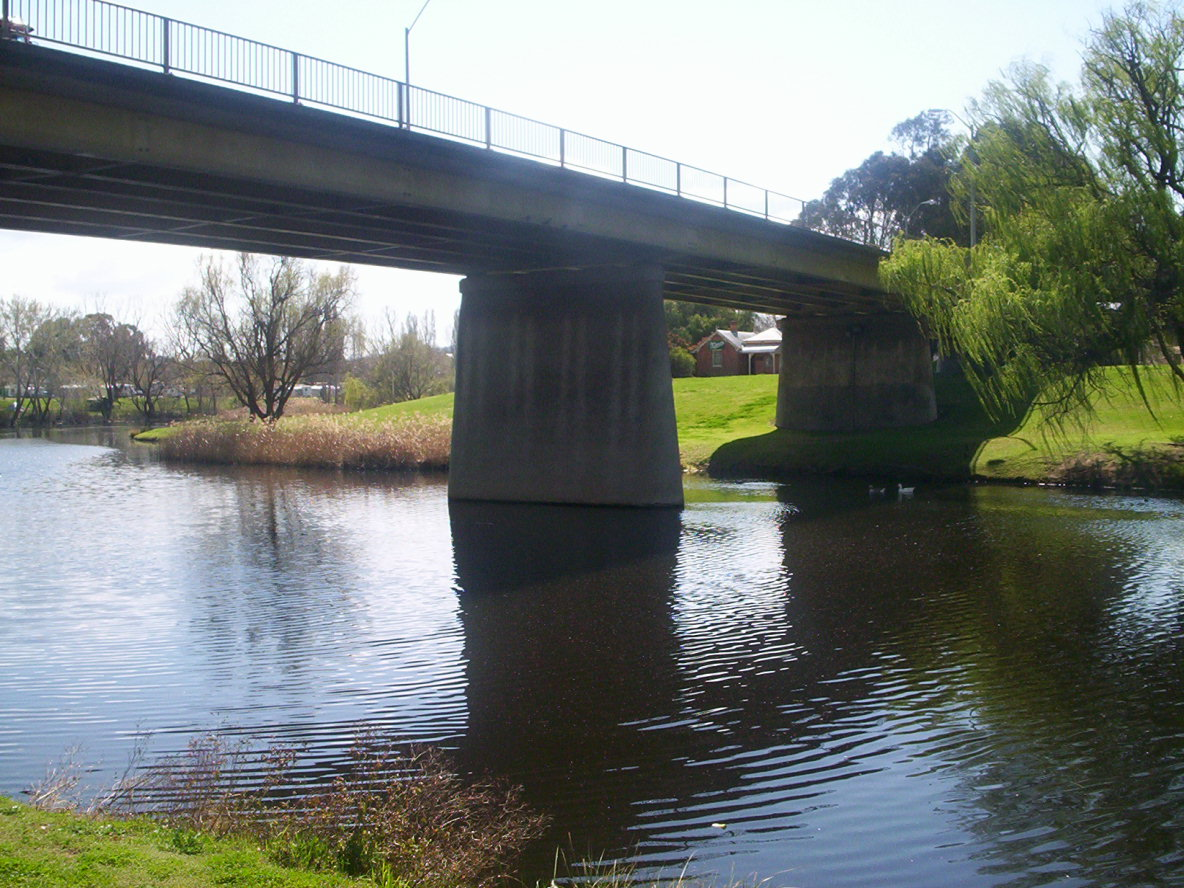
Bridge over the Queanbeyan River

William James Farrer, the wheat experimentalist, established Queanbeyan's reputation as an agricultural district with his famous "Federation" rust-free strain, developed on his property "Lambrigg" at Tharwa. Farrer's work was only slowly recognised elsewhere in Australia, but local farmers supported him, particularly in his development of "Blount's Lambrigg", another strain which in 1889 gave hope to farmers after the disastrous season of 1887 when crops had failed after heavy Christmas rains.

At the height of its rural prosperity Queanbeyan boasted sixteen public houses and six flourmills powered by wind, water, horse and steam. The Royal Hotel on Monaro Street opened in 1926. In Canberra alcohol was prohibited from 1911, at the time of the territory's foundation, until 1928, when Federal Parliament had relocated from Melbourne. In that period many of the capital's residents crossed the border to drink at one of Queanbeyan's hotels.

Queanbeyan was granted city status on 7 July 1972. On 21 July 1975 the Queen's Bridge was opened. This bridge took pressure off the existing bridge in linking Monaro Street directly to the east. From 1982 to 1989, the Canberra Raiders rugby league team played their home games in Queanbeyan, at Seiffert Oval.

Since December 2008, the Australian Defence Forces's HQ Joint Operations Command has been based adjacent to the Kowen district of the Australian Capital Territory, just south of the Kings Highway, about 15 km east of Queanbeyan, and 15 km south of Bungendore, New South Wales.

== Heritage listings ==
Queanbeyan has a number of heritage-listed sites, including:

- Antill Street: Rusten House
- 69 Collett Street: Hibernia Lodge
- 19–41 Farrer Place: Queanbeyan Showground
- Goulburn-Bombala railway: Queanbeyan railway bridge
- Henderson Road: Queanbeyan railway station
- Morrisett Street: Byrnes Mill and Millhouse
- 2 Morisset Street: St Stephen's Presbyterian Church and Manse
- Rutledge Street: Christ Church
- 3 Tharwa Road: Kawaree

== Today ==
Queanbeyan has three government high schools: Queanbeyan High, Karabar High and Jerrabomberra High. Queanbeyan primary schools include Queanbeyan South Public School, Queanbeyan West Public School, Queanbeyan East Public School, Queanbeyan Public School, Jerrabomberra Public School and St Gregory's Primary School.

The Queanbeyan District Hospital is a small but modern facility providing Maternity, Emergency and some Community Health services. Queanbeyan has an ambulance station, indoor and outdoor swimming pool, community centre, performing arts centre, a public library and several parks.

After police operations at 8 Farrer Place were moved to temporary accommodation in Morisset Street, the old station, opened in July 1978, was demolished starting in February 2019. Construction of the new A$24 million station began in November 2019, completion was due January 2021. The station became fully operational in March 2021, and was officially opened on 26 April 2021.

== Population ==
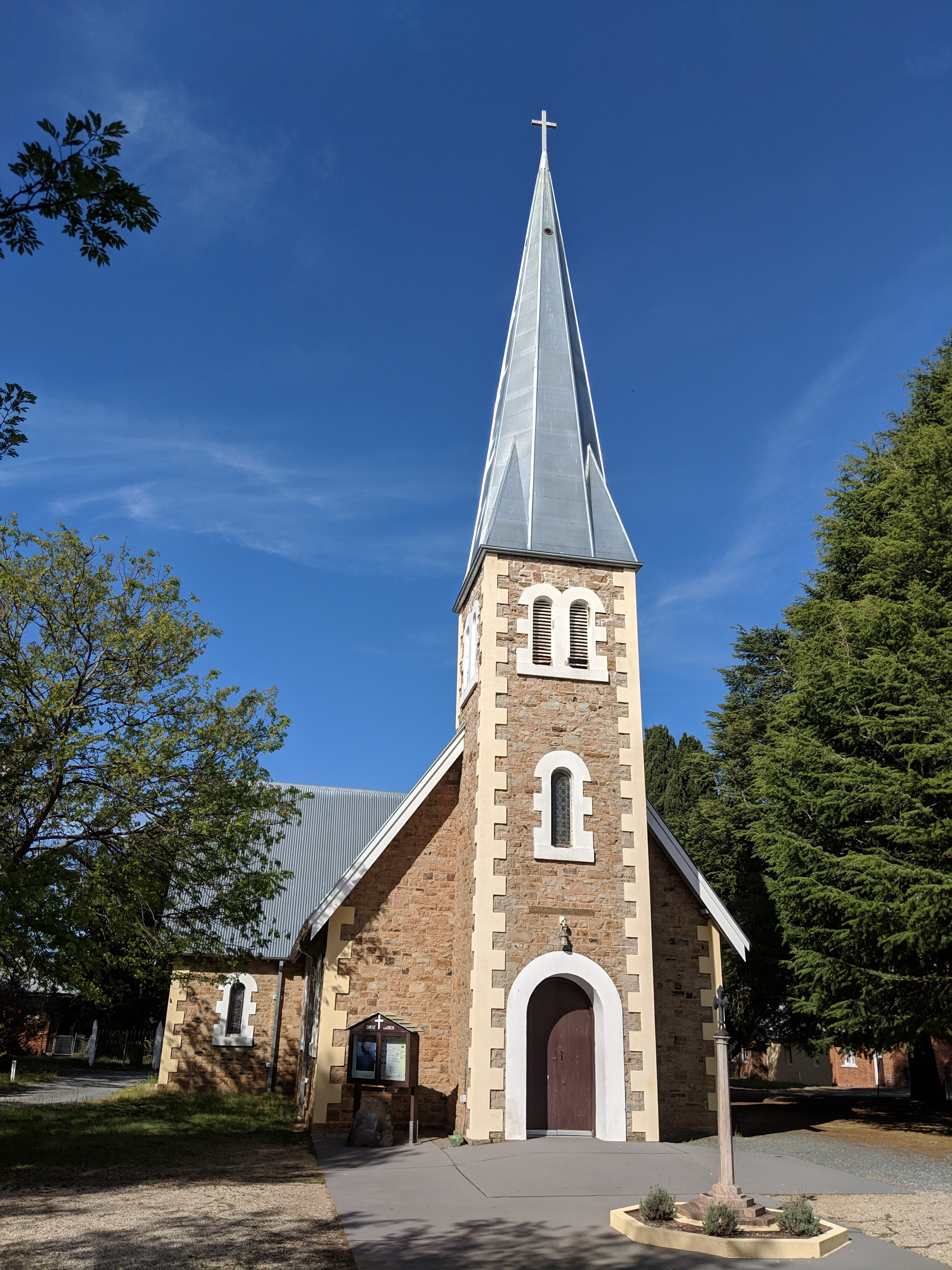
Christ Church

At the 2021 census, the Queanbeyan part of the Canberra–Queanbeyan built-up area had a population of 37,511 (this did not include Googong). At the 2011 census, the former city of Queanbeyan had a population of 37,991. The suburb of Queanbeyan (central Queanbeyan) had a population of 6,409 in 2021.

Historical population
Year	Pop.	±%
1921	1,825	—
1933	4,019	+120.2%
1947	5,033	+25.2%
1954	7,310	+45.2%
1961	9,448	+29.2%
1966		—
1971		—
1976	18,923	—
1981	19,383	+2.4%
1986	21,850	+12.7%
1991	23,714	+8.5%
1996	25,689	+8.3%
2001	29,752	+15.8%
2006	34,084	+14.6%
2011	35,878	+5.3%
2016	36,348	+1.3%
2021	37,511	+3.2%
Source: Australian Bureau of Statistics data.

== Commerce and industry ==
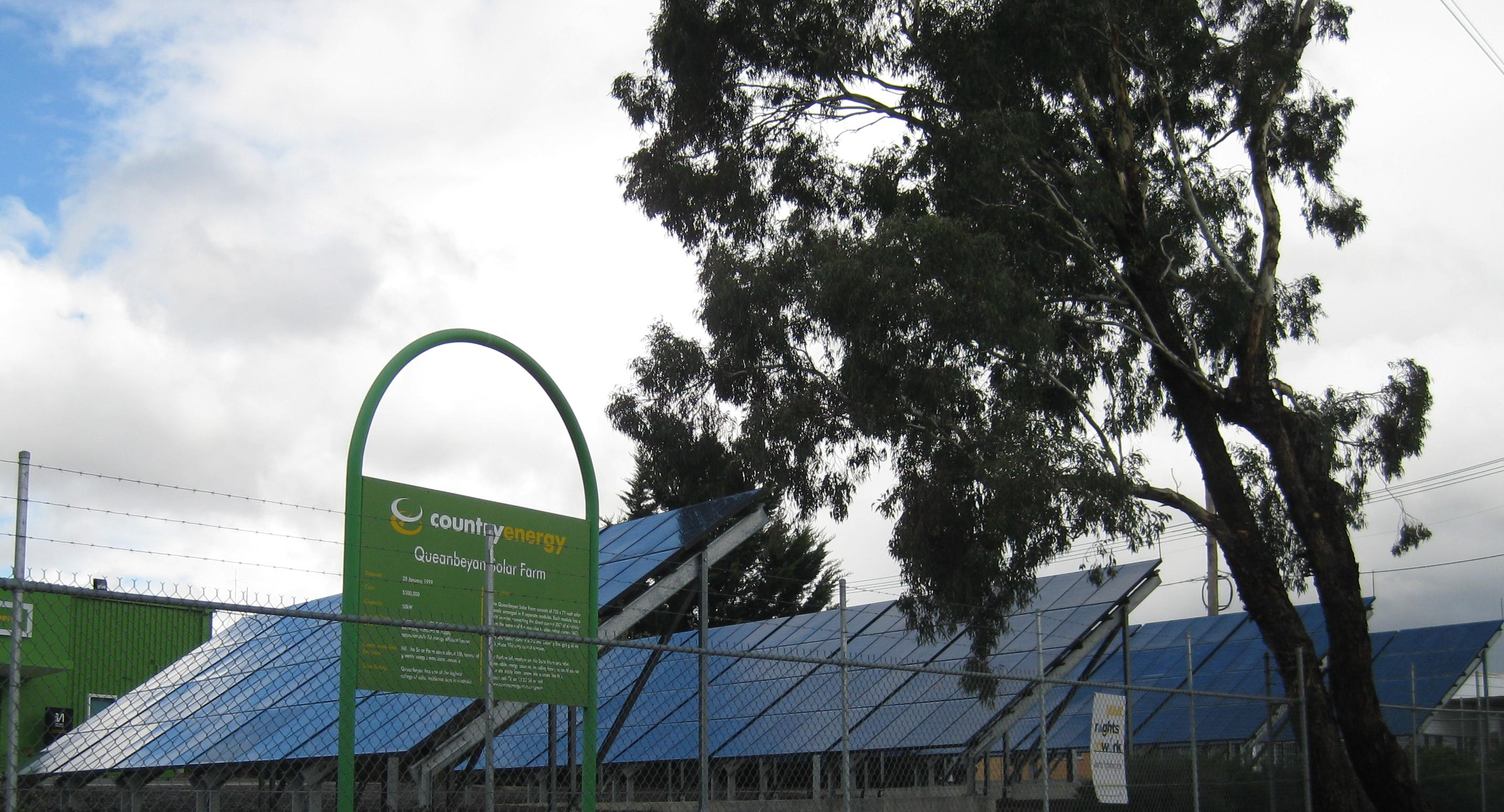
The Queanbeyan Solar Farm was established in 1999

Queanbeyan has two light manufacturing/industrial precincts centred on Gilmore Road and Yass Road. The Queanbeyan Solar Farm with 720 solar panels has a generating capacity of 50 kW, and is located in the Yass Road area. Queanbeyan has a large and significant retail market in roses, which are sourced from the local district.

== Transport ==
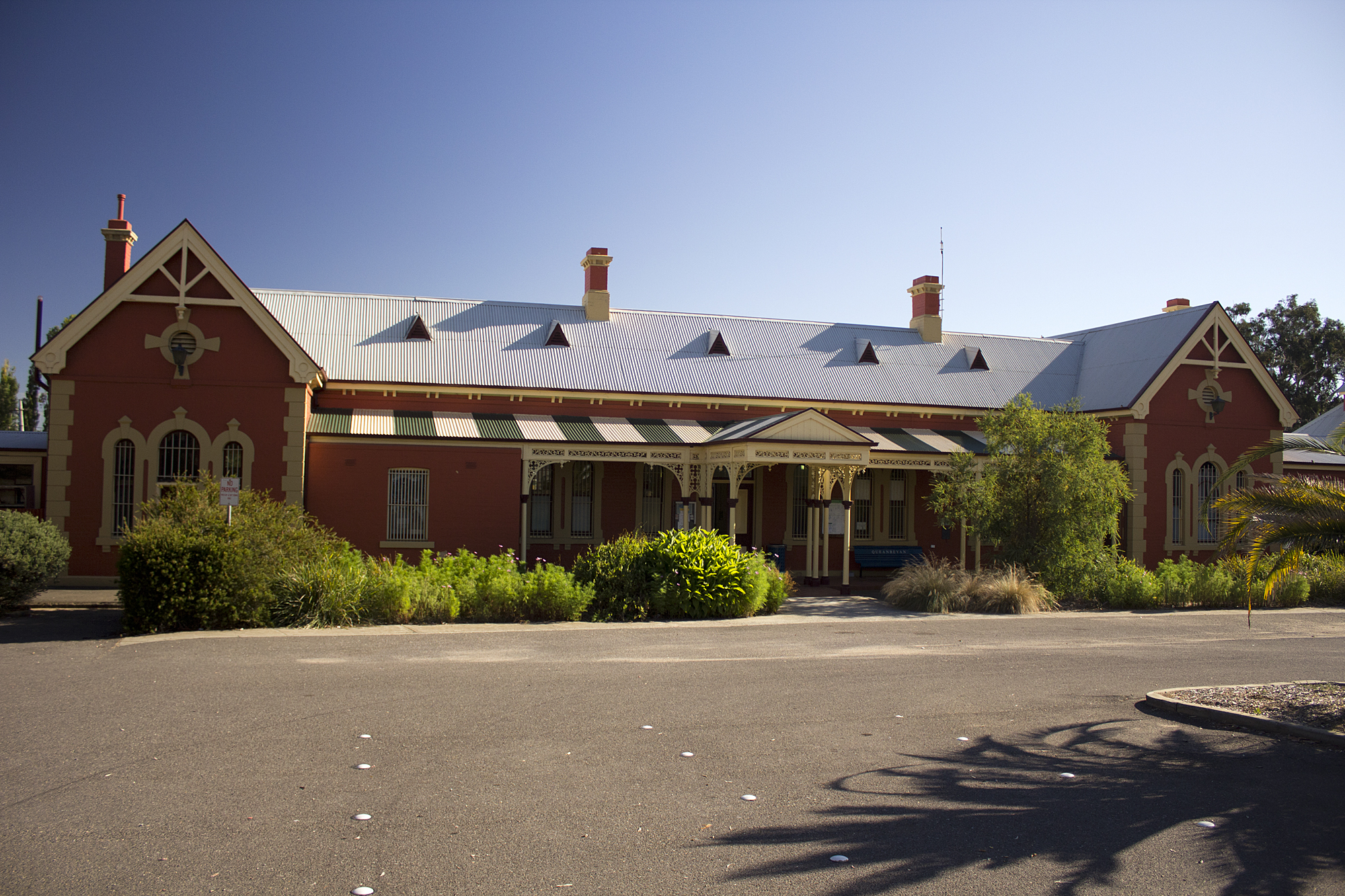
Queanbeyan railway station

Queanbeyan is served by NSW TrainLink Xplorer which runs several times each day between Canberra and Sydney, calling at heritage listed Queanbeyan railway station. NSW TrainLink also operates regional coaches via Queanbeyan city.

The city's local bus service is CDC Canberra, which connects Queanbeyan and its suburbs to City Interchange and Woden Interchange in Canberra, as well as other towns in NSW including Bungendore and Yass.

Regional coach services to the coast and Canberra are also provided by Rixons Buses and Murrays.

Air services are available at the nearby (10 km) Canberra Airport.

Local bus services (including cross border services to Canberra and Canberra Airport) are provided by CDC Canberra.

== Sport and culture ==
Queanbeyan has a number of sports teams that play in local sports competitions.

Team	Sport	Tournament
Queanbeyan Whites	Rugby Union	ACTRU Premier Division
Monaro Panthers FC	Association Football	NPL
Queanbeyan City FC	Association Football	NPL
Queanbeyan Blues	Rugby league	Canberra Rugby League
Queanbeyan Kangaroos	Rugby League	Canberra Rugby League
Queanbeyan Tigers	Australian rules football	AFL Canberra
Queanbeyan Cricket Club	Cricket	ACT Cricket Competition
Queanbeyan United Hockey Club	Field hockey	Hockey ACT

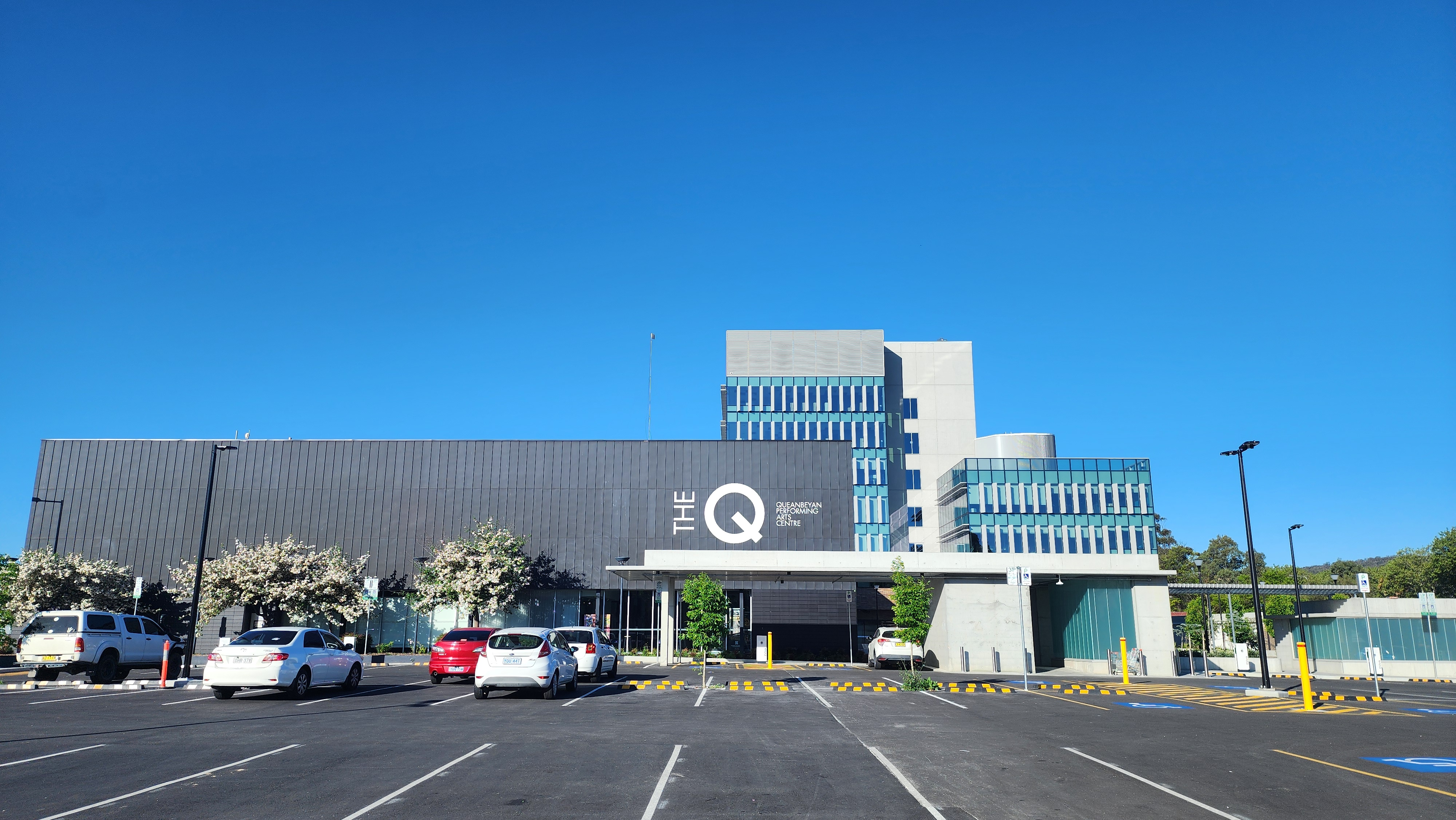
The "Q" – Queanbeyan Performing Arts Centre

The Queanbeyan Show, which started over 100 years ago, is held annually at the Queanbeyan Showground in November over two days. There are equestrian events, a sideshow alley, art and craft displays, cooking exhibits, an agricultural pavilion and livestock exhibitions. Also held is a Showgirl, Miss Junior Showgirl and Tiny Tots competition. Seiffert Oval is one of the largest stadia in the region.

In February, the Queanbeyan Showground plays host to the annual "Convoy for Kids" to aid cancer research. The event is widely supported by community groups, regional businesses and the emergency services. The event attracts hundreds of commercial vehicles, trucks, prime movers and bushfire brigade vehicles. The highlight of the afternoon is the sounding of horns, which can be heard for miles around. Other regular events throughout the year include the Rodeo in March which was in its 20th year in 2020, but was cancelled in 2021 due to the COVID-19 pandemic, Field Days, and a camping and off-road vehicle show. Queanbeyan Basketball Stadium is based on Southbar Road in the suburb of Karabar and is the main venue used for indoor sports like basketball and netball.

On 3 December, Queanbeyan hosts an annual Festival of Ability as part of the Don't DIS my ABILITY campaign, celebrating International Day of Persons with Disabilities. The event attracts more than 3,500 people and is a community celebration, acknowledging the strengths, skills and achievements of people with a disability in the Queanbeyan region.

Queanbeyan hosts several car shows through the year among them being Shannons Wheels in March 2020, and "Terribly British Day" in early December, a car and bike show that has been held in the Australian Capital Territory region since 1975. The show was in years past held on the lawns of Old Parliament House.

In March 2008, the Queanbeyan Performing Arts Centre – the Q – became the new home for the Queanbeyan Players who have provided over thirty years of live theatre and dramatic entertainment for the Queanbeyan community.

Canberra's Harmonie German Club holds an Oktoberfest over a three-day period every year in October. Previously held at Exhibition Park in Canberra (EPIC), in 2017 the event moved over the border to the Queanbeyan Showground on 27–29 October.

In 2021 a scaled-down, 2 day, version of the Canberra-based National Folk Festival, cancelled in 2020 due to the COVID-19 pandemic in Australia, titled "Good Folk", was held in Queanbeyan, across Saturday 3 April and Sunday 4 April.

== Media ==
=== Television ===
Queanbeyan receives five free-to-air television networks relayed from Canberra that broadcast from the Black Mountain.

- ABC
- SBS
- Seven
- WIN Television (Nine)
- 10

=== Radio ===
The city is served by these radio stations:

- ABC Radio Canberra on 666 AM (national)
- Hit 104.7 on 104.7 FM (commercial)
- 2CA on 1053 AM/105.7 FM (commercial)
- QBN FM on 96.7 FM (community)

=== Newspapers ===
The local newspaper is The Queanbeyan Age.

== Politics ==
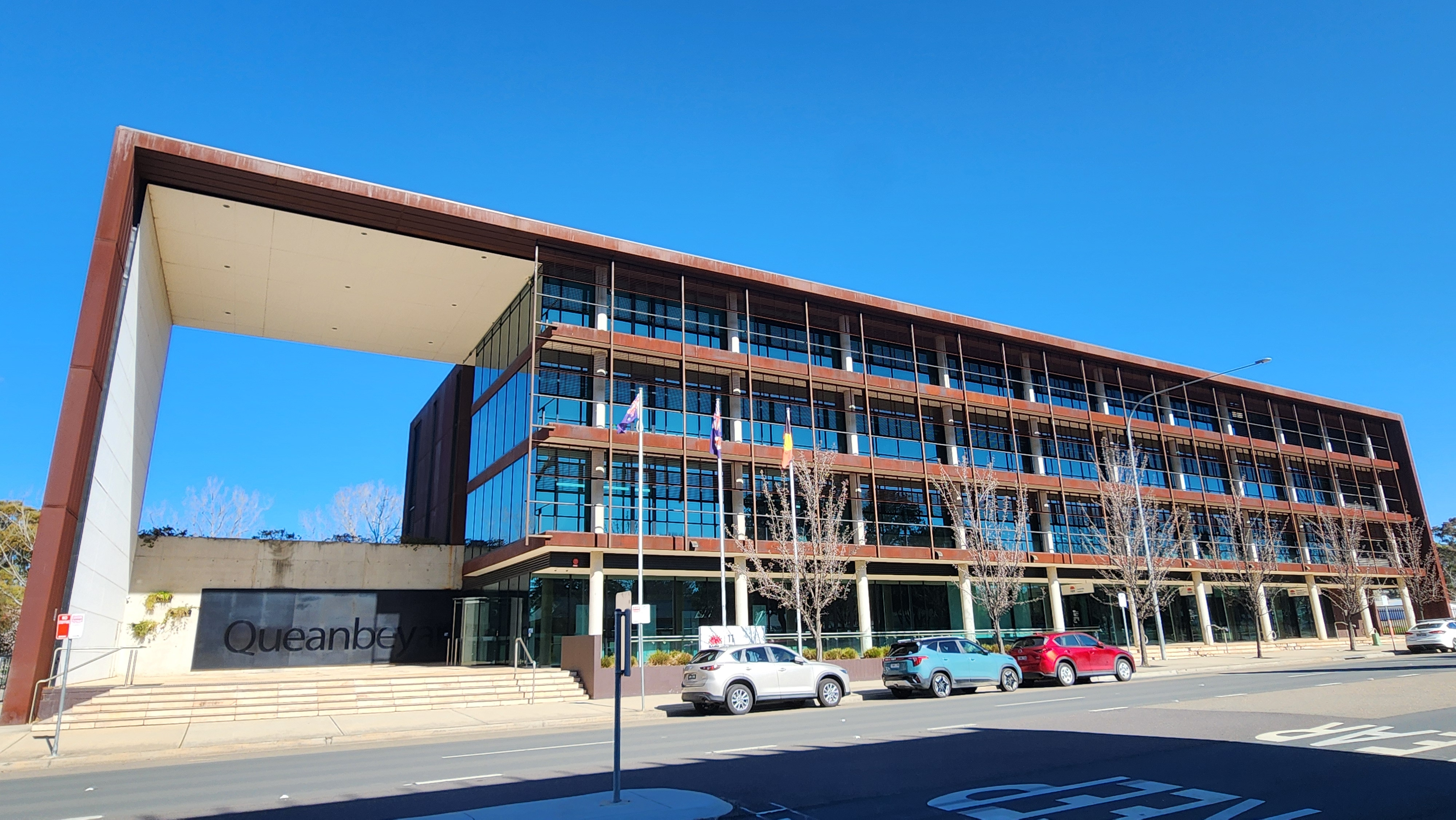
The Queanbeyan Government Service Centre building

Federally, Queanbeyan lies within the electorate of Eden-Monaro, currently held by Kristy McBain representing the Australian Labor Party.

At a state level, Queanbeyan is the major population centre in the seat of Monaro, held by Steve Whan of the New South Wales Labor Party since May 2023.

== Historic places and monuments ==
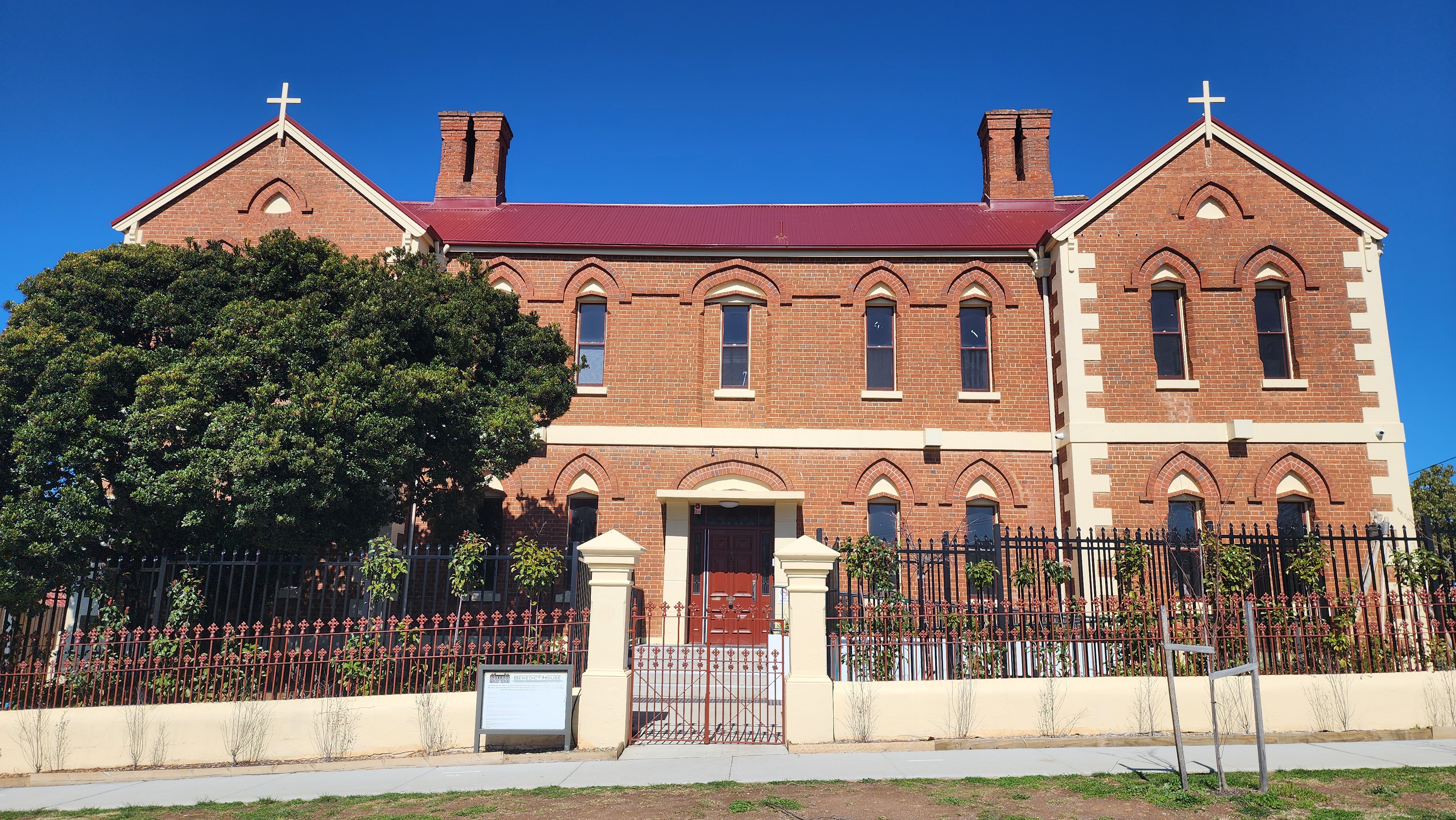
A former monastery, St Benedicts now houses a number of local businesses

- 1838 Anna Maria Faunce memorial: The oldest memorial grave-stone in existence in Queanbeyan was/is that of Anna Maria Faunce (born 30 November 1838), the eight-month-old daughter of Captain Allured Tasker Faunce. The Memorial had not been seen for many years and was rediscovered by the Wheeler family. The broken stone pieces were taken to the Queanbeyan Museum to arrange for repairs, sighted in broken pieces in a box at the Museum in the late 1990s, but the location now, is unknown.
- 1903 Queanbeyan Boer War memorial: Made of sandstone, the original memorial, had a gas light on top and was placed at the Monaro and Crawford Streets intersection in Queanbeyan, it was damaged when hit by a truck in the early 1950s and was repaired and re-erected on the same site. In 1955 the re-erected 1903 Boer War memorial was hit again by the same truck and same driver, Henry Ford, but this time it could not be repaired. As Veterans from the Boer War were still alive and wanted the 1903 Boer War memorial repaired/replaced, a public subscription was raised and a concrete replica memorial was cast and erected in 1964 in the centre-medium strip in Lowe Street, opposite the back of the Queanbeyan Courthouse. Although the memorial is a replica and although all the Boer War Veterans have since died, the remembrance, sentiment and respect for those who fought in the Boer War remains; Queanbeyan City Council undertakes regular conservation work, and the Queanbeyan RSL places a wreath on the Boer War Memorial each ANZAC DAY.
- 1923 Soldiers Memorial: Originally named the Soldiers Memorial, unveiled on 25 April 1923 Anzac Day but over time this memorial has had many local names such as the World War 1 memorial, World War 1 and 2 memorial and the World Wars memorial etc. but for many years has also been referred to as the Memorial for all Wars and all who served, be they men or women, who gave service in any capacity. General manager (now retired) Hugh Percy was the man who kicked the local Queanbeyan ANZAC Day ceremony off and got it growing and now every year the local Queanbeyan ANZAC Day ceremony grows bigger and better.
- 1936–1938 William Farrer memorial: Located on the central medium strip in Farrer Place, this sandstone and bronze memorial was unveiled in two ceremonies, 1936 and 1938. In 1936 the central sandstone column with the larger than life William Farrer bronze portrait bust at the top, with Raynor Hoff, the artist's signature on the bust and the large central plaque with "Farrer's quote" underneath the bust, were unveiled in 1936; The four smaller wheat-industry bronze-relief plaques (two on either side of the central sandstone column) were probably completed by other artists in Hoff's studio and were unveiled in 1938, during Queanbeyan's 1938 centenary celebrations.
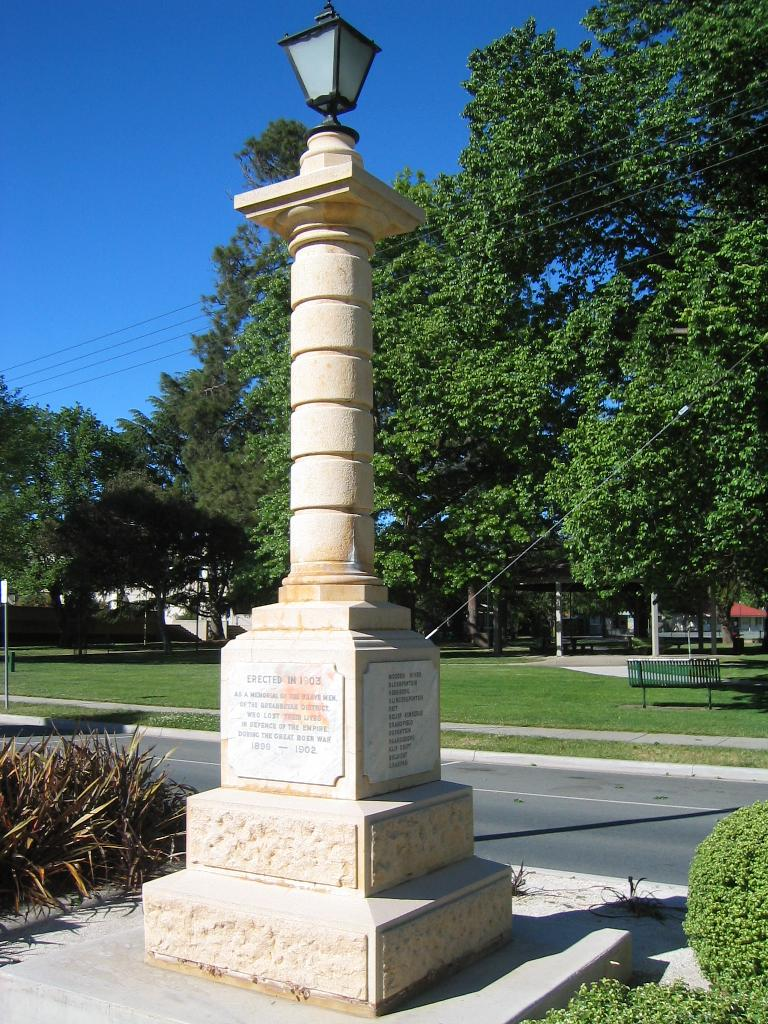
Second Boer War memorial

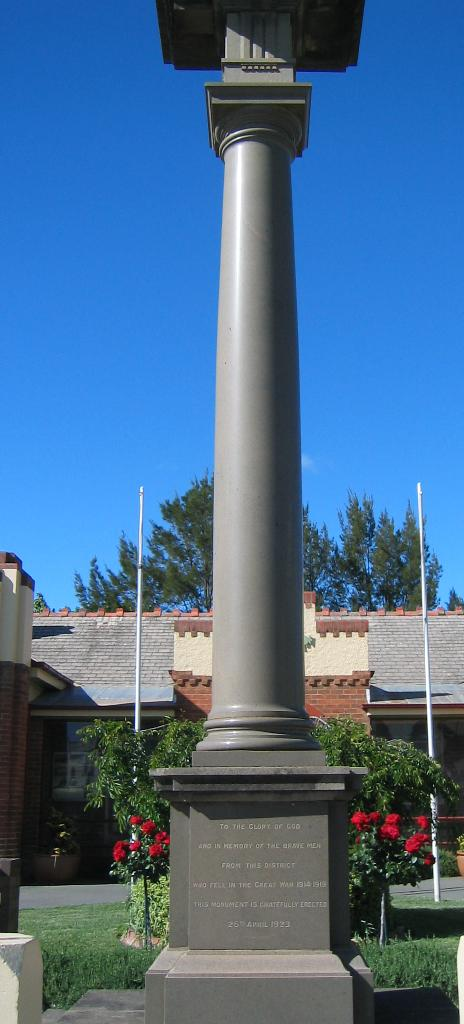
World War I memorial

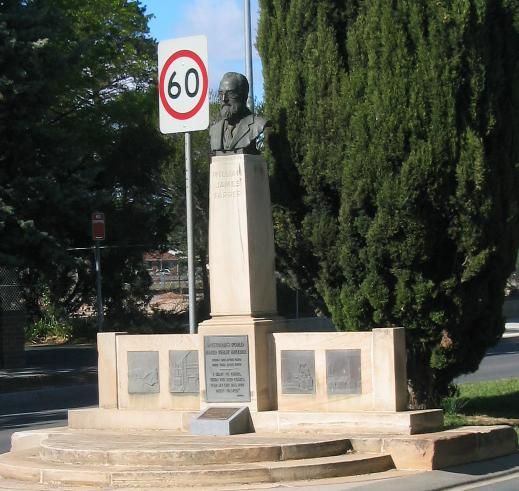
William Farrer memorial

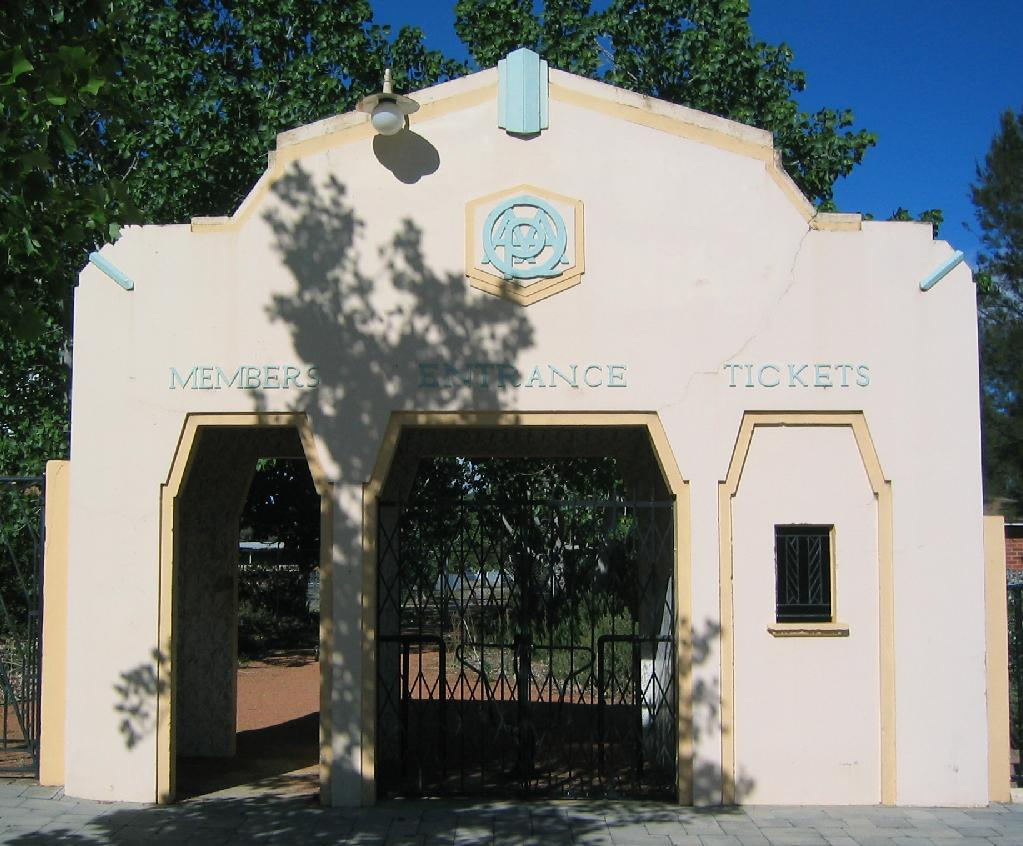
Memorial Gates - Queanbeyan Showgrounds

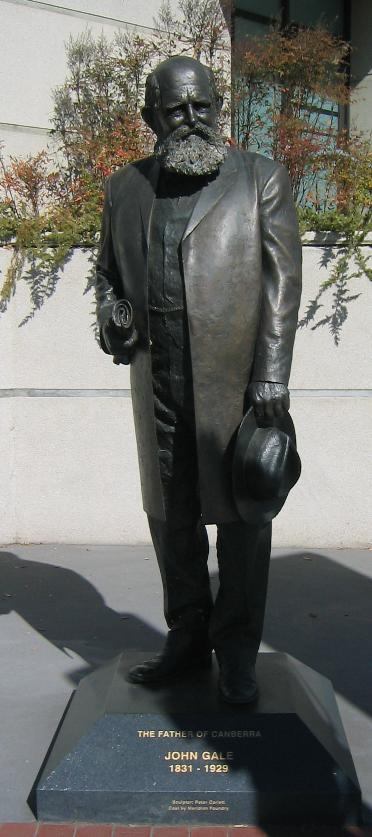
John Gale (journalist) "The Father of Canberra"

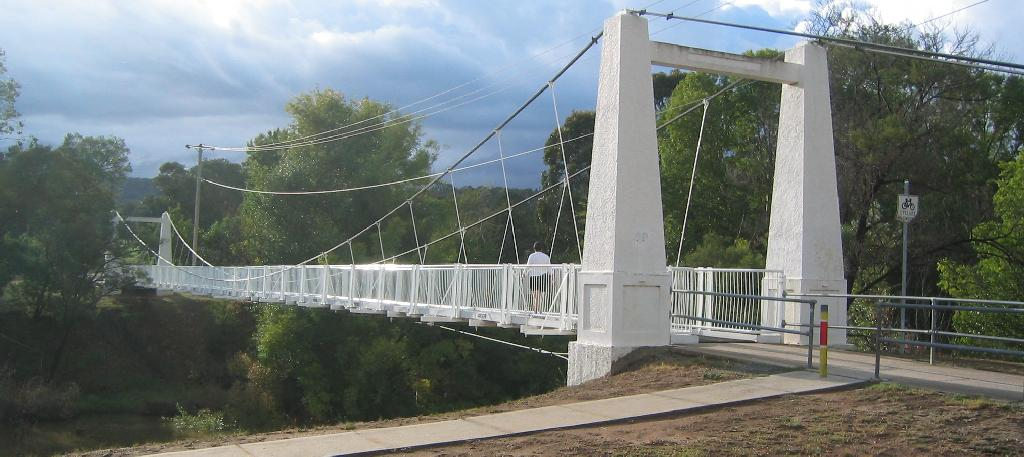
Historical Queanbeyan suspension foot bridge

== Notable residents ==
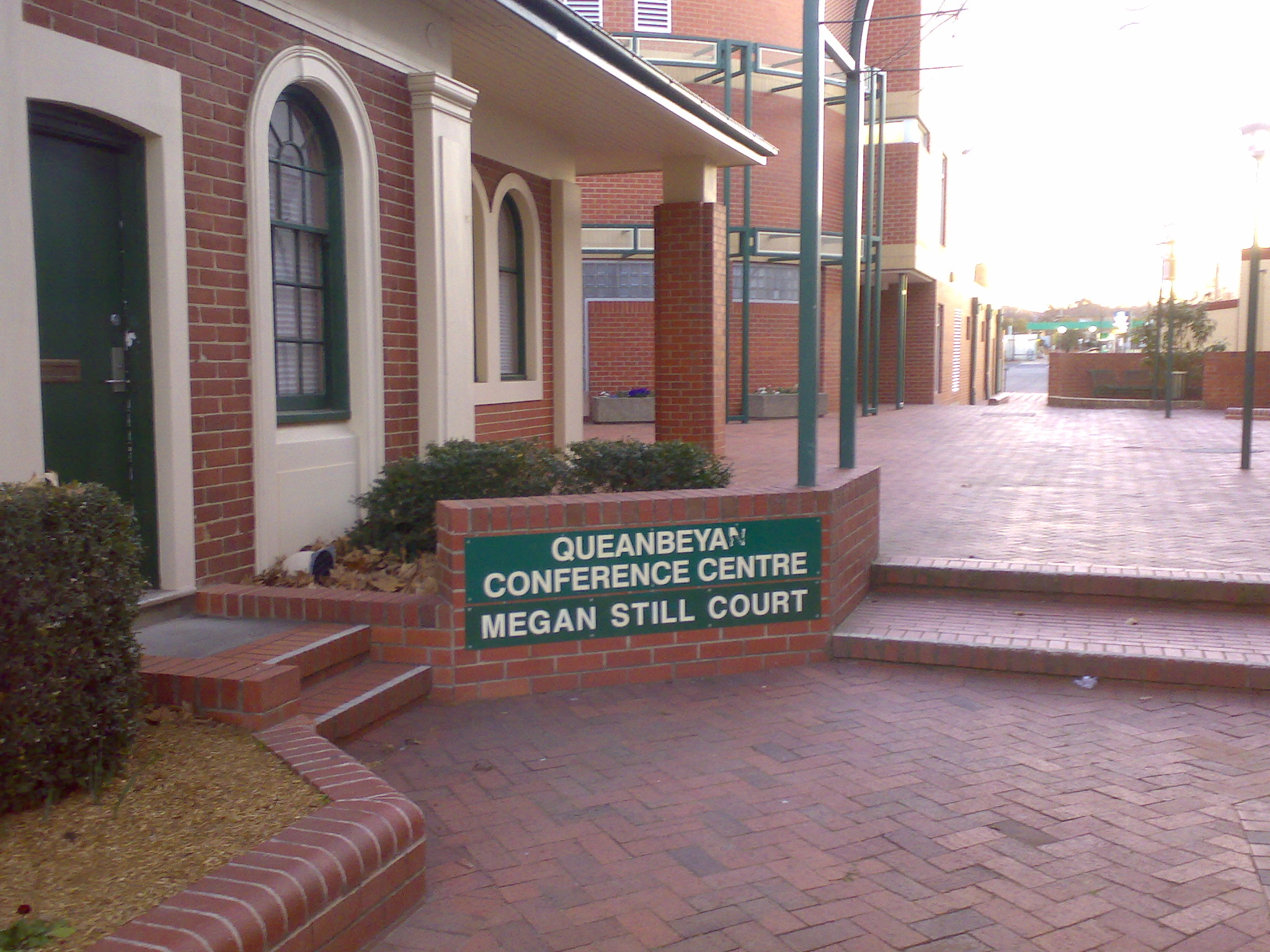
Queanbeyan's "Megan Still Court" immediately adjacent the City Council Chambers, named in honour of Queanbeyan's former olympic women's rowing pair gold medalist

- Mark Asbock − Rugby League player, Canberra Raiders
- Suzanne Balogh – Sport Shooter & Olympic Gold Medal winner
- David Campese – Rugby Union player, Wallaby winger & 1991 Rugby World Cup winner
- Terry Campese – Rugby League player, Kangaroos, NSW, Canberra Raiders captain, nephew of David Campese
- Anthony Fainga'a – Rugby Union player, Queensland Reds and Wallaby centre
- Saia Fainga'a – Rugby Union player, Queensland Reds and Wallaby hooker
- David Furner – Rugby League player, Kangaroos, NSW, Canberra Raiders player and coach
- Sebastian Giampaolo – former Male soccer player, Socceroos, Inter Monaro and APIA
- Matt Giteau – Rugby Union player for Australian Wallabies, RC Toulonnais and formerly Brumbies and Western Force
- Brad Haddin – Cricketer for NSW and Australia
- Matt Henjak – Rugby Union player, Wallaby and Western Force halfback
- Joe Janiak – Horse trainer and owner of gelding racehorse Takeover Target, a Group One winner in each Australian State
- Harry Holland – Politician and leader of the New Zealand Labour Party
- Brent Kite – Rugby League player for NSW and Australia
- Hau Latukefu – ARIA award-winning MC & triple j radio and TV presenter
- Glenn Lazarus – Former Senator for Palmer United Party, Kangaroos, NSW, Canberra Raiders, Brisbane Broncos and Melbourne Storm rugby league player
- George Lazenby – Actor and only Australian to play James Bond, in On Her Majesty's Secret Service
- Megan Marcks (née Still) – Olympic women's (pairs) rowing gold medalist
- Heather McKay AM, MBE – Australian squash champion
- Lawrence Mooney – Australian comedian
- Tommy Murphy – award-winning playwright
- Omar Musa – Australian poet, hip-hop artist and author
- Fergus Pragnell – Member of the Australian rowing team
- Karly Roestbakken – Women's Soccer Player, Canberra United FC player
- Ben Snow – Academy Award nominee for visual effects
- Ricky Stuart – Rugby League player, Kangaroo, NSW & Canberra Raiders player, Kangaroos and NSW Coach
- Mark Webber – FIA World Endurance Championship for Porsche and former Formula 1 driver for Red Bull Racing

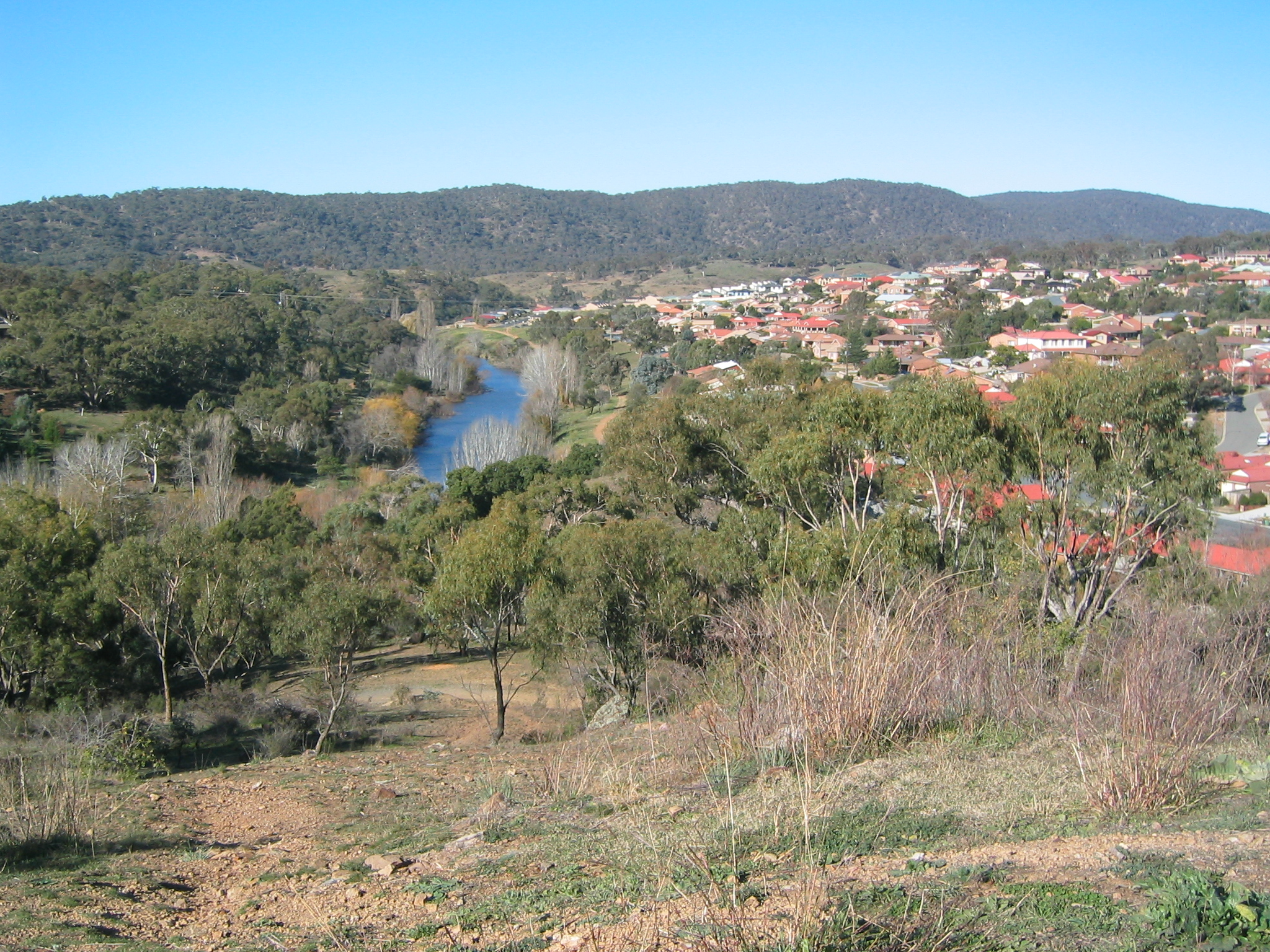
Overlooking Karabar and the Queanbeyan River

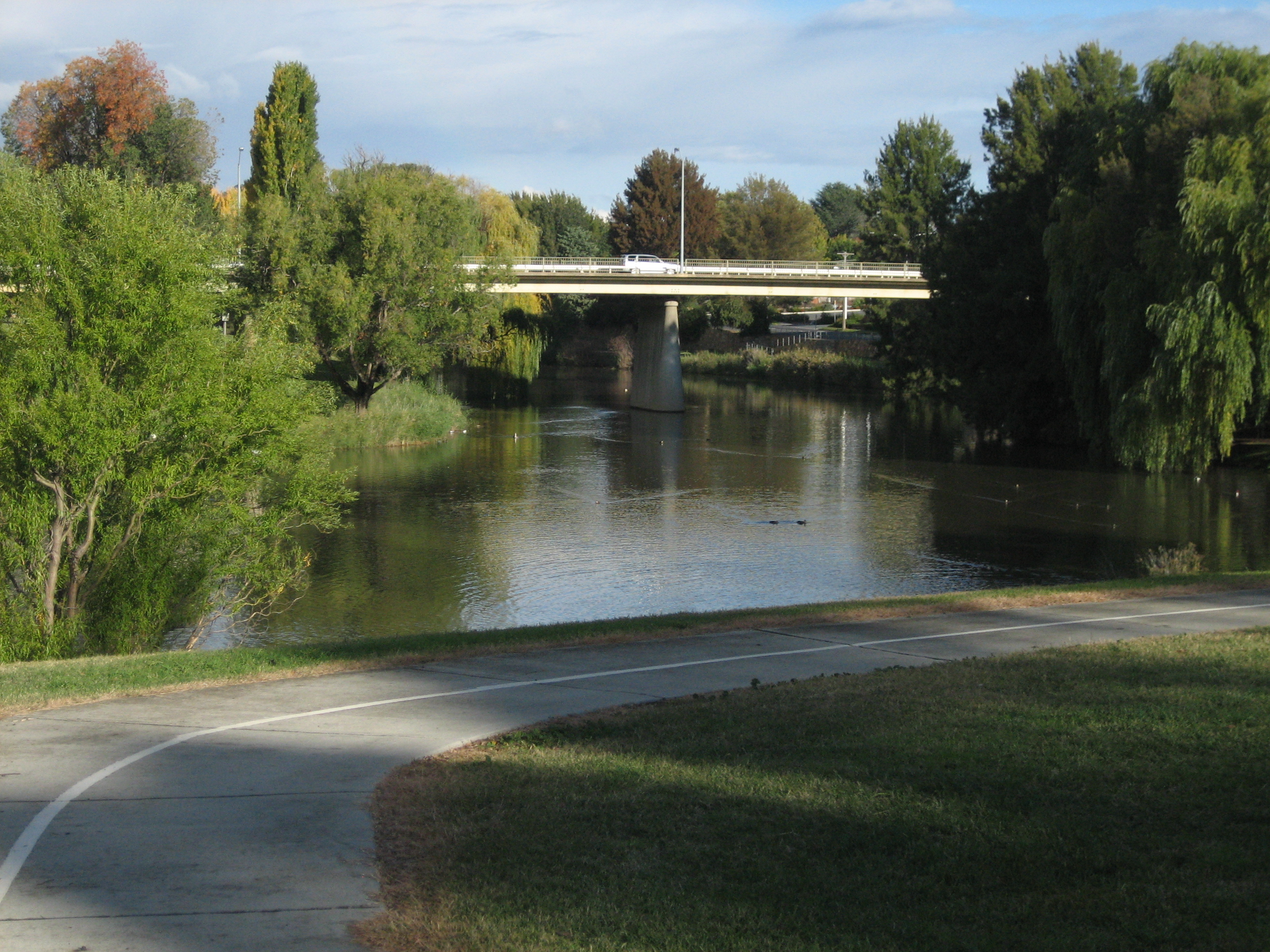
Bike paths connect the Queanbeyan CBD to Canberra

== Suburbs ==
- Carwoola
- Crestwood
- Environa
- Googong
- Greenleigh
- Jerrabomberra
- Karabar
- Queanbeyan East
- Queanbeyan West
- Queanbeyan
- The Ridgeway
- Royalla
- Tralee
- (Oaks Estate is sometimes mistakenly assumed to be part of Queanbeyan but is in fact located in the Australian Capital Territory.)

== Popular culture ==
The Choirboys song 'Struggle Town' was written about Queanbeyan after lead singer Mark Gable heard the reference to the town from the band's drummer Lindsay Tebbutt's father called Queanbeyan "Struggle Town".

== Climate ==
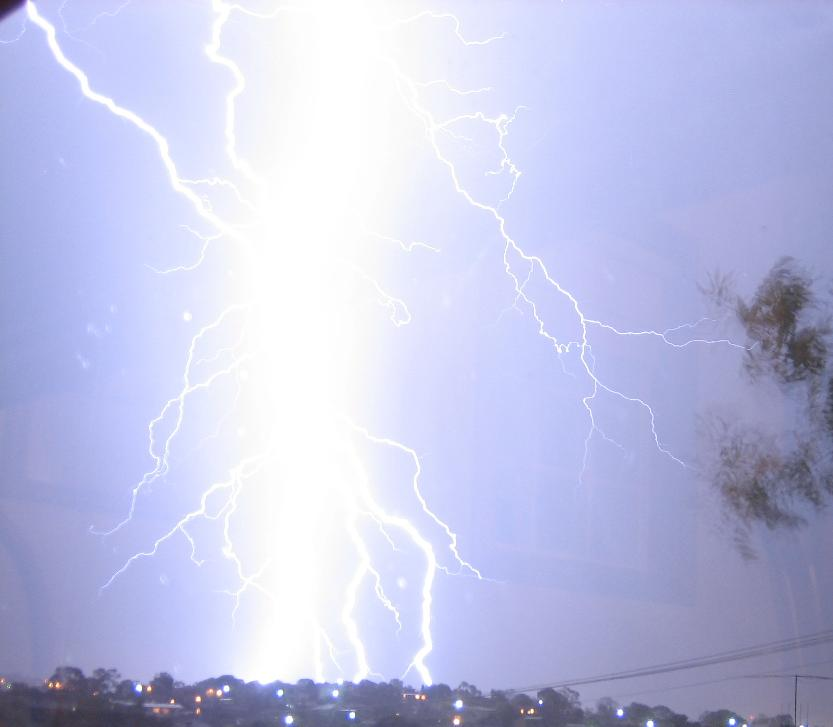
Lightning storms over Queanbeyan, 21 February 2007

Queanbeyan has an oceanic climate (Cfb) with warm summers and cool winters, similar to Canberra.

Climate data for Queanbeyan Bowling Club (1909–1956, rainfall 1870–2019); 580 m AMSL
Month	Jan	Feb	Mar	Apr	May	Jun	Jul	Aug	Sep	Oct	Nov	Dec	Year
Mean daily maximum °C (°F)	29.0 (84.2)	28.5 (83.3)	25.6 (78.1)	20.6 (69.1)	15.9 (60.6)	12.5 (54.5)	11.8 (53.2)	13.7 (56.7)	17.3 (63.1)	20.7 (69.3)	24.4 (75.9)	27.6 (81.7)	20.6 (69.1)
Mean daily minimum °C (°F)	12.7 (54.9)	12.9 (55.2)	10.7 (51.3)	6.6 (43.9)	3.3 (37.9)	0.9 (33.6)	−0.2 (31.6)	0.9 (33.6)	3.3 (37.9)	6.0 (42.8)	8.9 (48.0)	11.4 (52.5)	6.5 (43.6)
Average rainfall mm (inches)	55.3 (2.18)	51.5 (2.03)	51.2 (2.02)	43.8 (1.72)	42.9 (1.69)	44.4 (1.75)	39.2 (1.54)	43.9 (1.73)	47.7 (1.88)	59.0 (2.32)	58.9 (2.32)	56.0 (2.20)	593.8 (23.38)
Average rainy days (≥ 1.0 mm)	4.7	4.4	4.3	4.3	4.5	5.5	5.4	6.0	6.2	6.6	6.1	5.3	63.3
Source: Australian Bureau of Meteorology (1909–1956 temperatures, rainfall 1870–2019)
