= Hibernia Lodge =

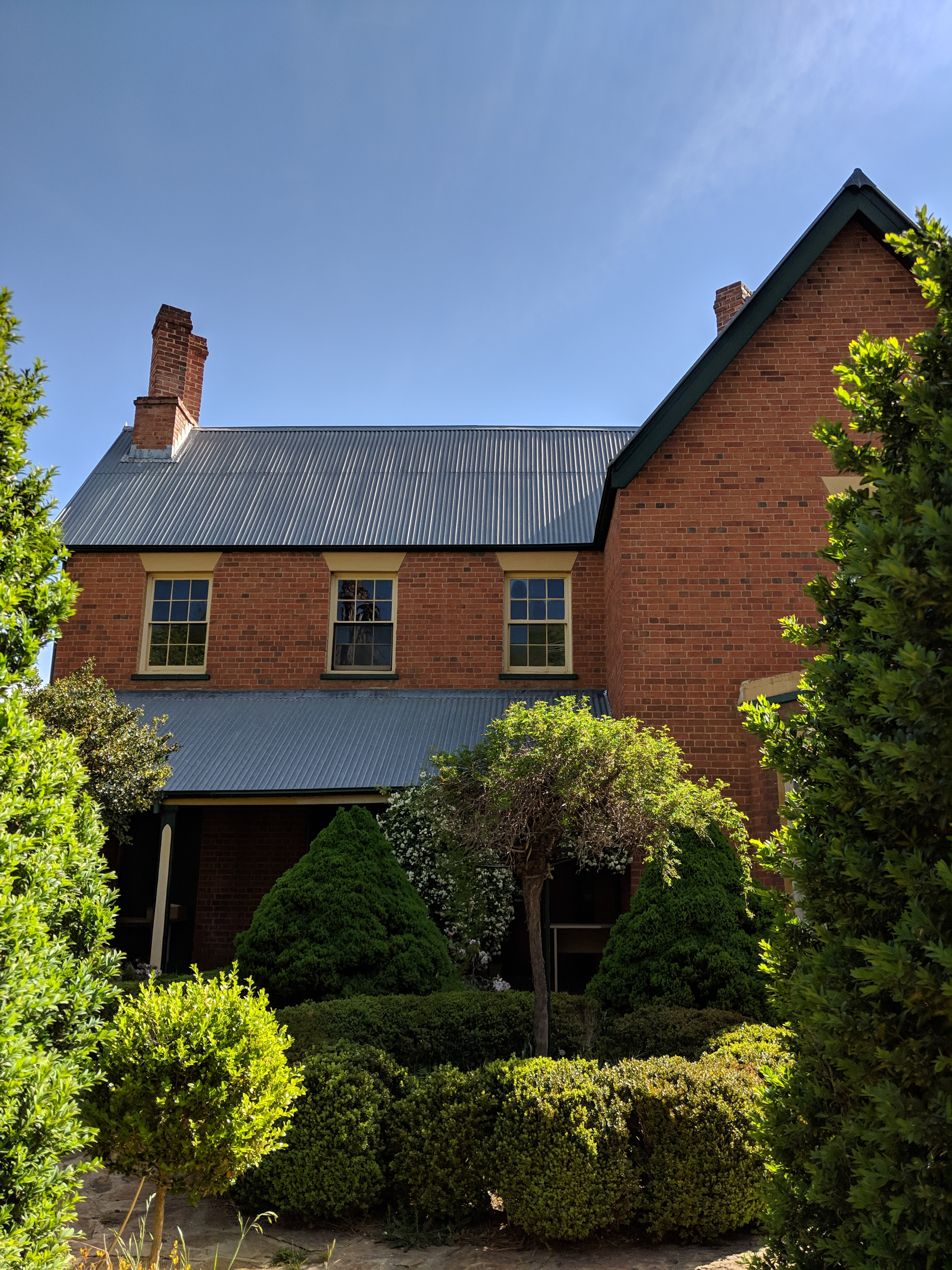

- Location within New South Wales Location within Australia
- 35.3496°S 149.2342°E
- Location: 69 Collett Street, Queanbeyan, Queanbeyan-Palerang Region, New South Wales, Australia

New South Wales Heritage Register
- Official name: Hibernia Lodge
- Type: state heritage (built)
- Designated: 2 April 1999
- Reference no.: 514
- Type: historic site

Hibernia Lodge is a heritage-listed residence at 69 Collett Street, Queanbeyan, in the Southern Tablelands region of New South Wales, Australia. It was added to the New South Wales State Heritage Register on 2 April 1999 and the former Register of the National Estate on 28 May 1996.

== History ==
It was built in 1865 as a residence for Obadiah Willans, the Queanbeyan Clerk of Petty Sessions. It was designed by architect Alberto Soares, most known for his work on churches in the region. During Willans' tenure, the house was described as the "social and cultural centre for the upper stratum of Queanbeyan society".

After Willans' ownership ended, it was a family home until 1950, then divided up into flats, restored in the early 1980s and operated as an antique shop and tea shop, and returned to a private residence in the late 1980s.

== Description ==
Hibernia Lodge is a two-storey cottage in the Victorian Gothic style made of handmade bricks with a high gabled roof. It has three additions, a single-storey addition probably from the late nineteenth century, a later single-storey timber addition, and a two-storey addition added in recent decades. The name stems from the Irish origins of Willans' wife, Mary.

== Heritage listing ==
Hibernia Lodge was listed on the New South Wales State Heritage Register on 2 April 1999.
