= Rusten House =

Old Queanbeyan Hospital
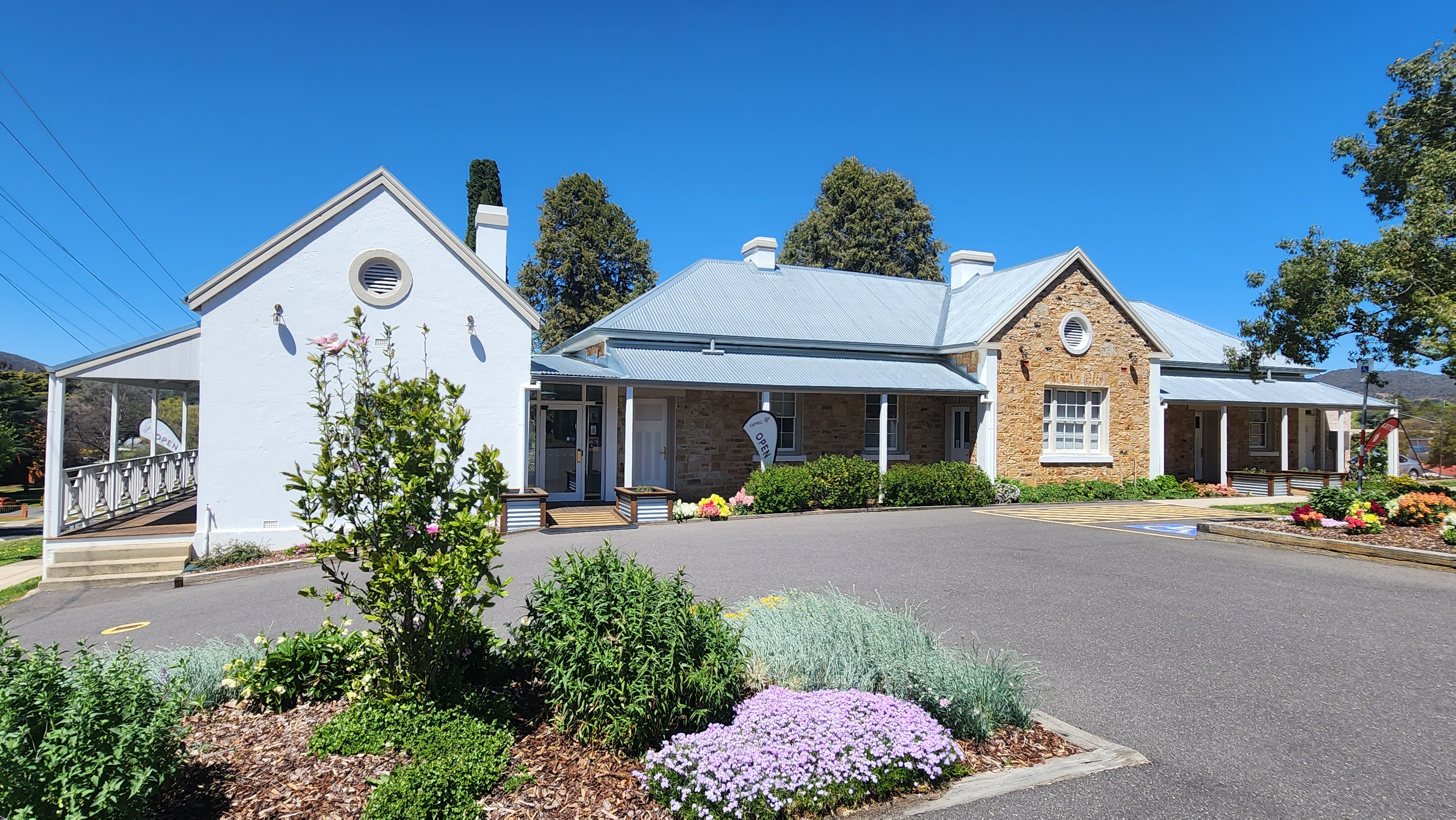

- Location within New South Wales Location within Australia
- 35.3485°S 149.2333°E
- Location: Antill Street, Queanbeyan, Queanbeyan-Palerang Region, New South Wales, Australia

History
- Built: 1859–1862

Site notes
- Architect: W. H.Downey (1859-61 sections)
- Owner: Queanbeyan-Palerang Regional Council

New South Wales Heritage Register
- Official name: Old Queanbeyan Hospital - Rusten House; Rusten House; Queanbeyan General Hospital; Old Queanbeyan Hospital; Nurses Dormitory
- Type: state heritage (built)
- Designated: 2 April 1999
- Reference no.: 552
- Type: Hospital
- Category: Health Services
- Builders: Daniel, Jordan and Gibson

Rusten House, now known as Rusten House Art Centre, is a heritage-listed former hospital and nurses' dormitory at Antill Street, Queanbeyan, Queanbeyan-Palerang Region, New South Wales, Australia. It was designed by W. H. Downey and built from 1859 to 1862 by Daniel Jordan and Gibson. It is the Old Queanbeyan Hospital and the Nurses Dormitory. It now hosts local and touring exhibitions as well as community and private events. The Queanbeyan-Palerang Regional Council owns it. It was added to the New South Wales State Heritage Register on 2 April 1999.

== History ==
Queanbeyan town was around long before nearby Canberra and up until 1838 was called Quinbean, which means "clear waters". The Queanbeyan area is part of the traditional lands of the Ngunnawal Aboriginal people. Diseases and viruses brought by colonial settlers, such as smallpox and influenza, had a disastrous effect on local Aboriginal populations by the mid-19th century.

Europeans first arrived in the area on 8 December 1820. The area became a natural halting place for travellers crossing the (Molonglo) river into the Monaro (to the south) and by 1824 prospective settlers were establishing "stock stations" around the region. Old maps of 1833 show no fewer than 12 stations in the Molonglo, Gundaroo, Lake George and Bungendore area. The first Post Office was established in Crawford Street to service settlers in 1836, and in 1837 Cptn. Alured Tasker Faunce of the 4th (King's own) Regiment was appointed resident Police Magistrate.

Queanbeyan was officially proclaimed a township in 1838 with a population at that time of about 50. Traces of gold were discovered in 1851 and lead and silver mines also flourished briefly. Settlers were harassed by bushrangers, of which John Tennant, Jacky Jacky, Frank Gardiner and Ben Hall were some of the more notorious.

Queanbeyan District Hospital began as an initiative of local citizens who formed a Benevolent Society in 1847 to operate a hospital for the indigent sick and injured. MaryAnn Rusten was the foundation matron of the institution and the hospital initially operated in a rented cottage in "Irishtown".

Rusten House was built to replace the Benevolent Asylum, to serve the more affluent community.

In 1847 there was the foundation meeting of the Queanbeyan District Hospital.

In 1859 W. H. Downey was appointed to draw up plans for a hospital building. He submitted a design for a stone building 74' long by 32' wide, to accommodate up to 16 patients. Tenders were submitted to erect the building. Local builders Daniel, Jordan and Gibson started construction. The building was completed in 1861.

In 1862 a ball was held to celebrate opening the new hospital. The Rusten family moved in to the new hospital.

In 1865 the hospital received its first subsidy from the Government of New South Wales.

In 1868 George Campbell became President of the Hospital Committee, marking the beginning the Campbell family's association with the hospital. In 1870 oaks (Quercus sp.), elms (Ulmus procera) and pine (Pinus sp.) trees were planted in the grounds.

In 1871 Thomas Jordan was commissioned to build a kitchen with a brick floor. In 1875 Matron Rusten died in office and a wash house and covered passageway were erected. In 1876 two iron ships' tanks were installed to serve as rainwater tanks for the building. In 1877 Dr. Sidney Longden Richardson started his association with the hospital, which lasted 41 years. In 1878 the Committee called for tenders to erect guttering and pipes to run water from the roof to the tanks.

In 1884 the hospital treated 42 patients. In 1885 Thomas Jordan erected a large ward at the eastern end of the building as a fever ward. The hospital treated 98 patients.

In 1886 the authorities increased the fee payable by the railway contractor. As a result, the contractor started his own hospital in the Kent House Hotel to treat his workers. In 1887 the hospital treated 35 patients and in 1889 18 patients.

In 1890 the Committee decided not to admit pauper patients, except those sent by the police. In 1891 the Committee decided to only admit patients recommended by a subscriber to the hospital. Dr Patrick Blackall commenced a long association with the hospital. Dr Blackall later became the foundation President of the Queanbeyan-Canberra Medical Society.

In 1892 the NSW Government applied the 1880 Hospital Act to Queanbeyan Hospital. This Act obliged the institution to accept all patients regardless of whether they could pay, or had been recommended by a subscriber. The hospital's land was enclosed by a fence and the buildings re-roofed with galvanised iron, and a skylight installed in the boardroom.

In 1895 hospital buildings were roofed with galvanised iron. There was also a mortuary in use, the site of which is now unknown. A skylight was installed in the board room.

Changing social attitudes saw the hospital's role change, and by the early 20th century it was a community hospital. Replaced by present hospital during the 1930s, it became a nurses' dormitory. It has been renamed after Matron Mary Rusten.

In 1924 plans for a new building on the site were drawn up. In 1933 the new hospital opened and Rusten House was converted for use as a nurses' dormitory. It was later used for ancillary purposes over the decades. The addition of internal partition walls and bathrooms presumably date to the time of its adaptation as a dormitory. At some stage the northern verandah was enclosed, and the southern verandahs rebuilt in wider form and enclosed to provide greater workspace and better internal circulation. The space between Rusten House and the Fever Ward was enclosed and subdivided to provide spaces for an office, bathroom and tea room. A doorway was cut through the stone wall to provide access from part of Rusten House to the bathroom, and a large opening cut through the brick wall of the Fever Ward to enable access to the tea room.

In 1988 a permanent conservation order was placed on Rusten House. Rusten House the original hospital building and its landscape setting was included on the NSW State Heritage Register in 1999.

In 2005 the Greater Southern Area Health Service finalised a project definition plan for redevelopment of Queanbeyan Hospital site. HSPC (NSW) was engaged to prepare plans for new works.

At the time of decommissioning, internal access between the Fever Ward and the east and west sections of Rusten House was provided by the wide enclosed verandah on the southern side of Rusten House, and by the enclosure of the western of the two northern verandahs.

In 2007 the Main Hospital building was under construction and a conservation plan for the building was prepared. In January 2007 a major project application for redevelopment of the hospital site was approved.

In 2012 the conservation management plan was updated by Godden Mackay Logan. In 2014 asbestos was removed from the building and some basic internal works done to arrest structural failings and make minor improvements for prospective users. A number of walls, cladding and pipework were removed and as a consequence it has not been possible to use the building since.

In 2014 the verandah enclosures were removed stopping internal access to the building.

The building was subsequently transferred from NSW Health to the Queanbeyan City Council.

In November 2016 the state government gave funding of $250,000 to the former Queanbeyan City Council to upgrade Rusten House and create an arts and cultural hub for the region. The amount was matched by Queanbeyan-Palerang Regional Council, and was expected to take at least two years to complete. It will be known as the Rusten House Arts Centre.

In April 2021 Rusten House Art Centre was formally opened to the public with multiple exhibitions. A historical display, showcasing the former hospitals history, was one of the key exhibits.

== Description ==
Site

The site is within the block dominated by the existing and new Queanbeyan Hospital between Antill, Collett and Erin Streets. Its urban context is residential with a combination of two storey units on Collett Street to the west, a single storey residential building opposite on Collett Street and a two-storey residential building opposite on Antill Street.

The Avenue street planting is generally random with well-spaced street trees remaining only along Collett Street south-east of the Antill Street intersection.

Rusten House is on rising ground on the north-eastern corner of the block at the junction of Collett and Antill Streets. The building is close to Collett Street. The building faces a mature and extensive terraced garden consisting of two clumps of trees at the upper level and a clump at the lower level near Antill Street. The building's main facade faces Antill Street although the slope of the land means that the building is barely visible from that street.

There are gardens to the north-west of the building and to the south-east. The garden to the north-west is on the site of part of the former 1905 Nurses' residence which extended from the 1885 wing parallel with Collett Street. The area consists of lawn and paths to the perimeter today. This forms part of the landscape curtilage of the building.

The garden to the south-east forms the address to the main 1859-61 building and consists of an upper forecourt, stepped middle garden and lower grassed slope. There is a semi-formal spatial axis between the two tree groups and the building.

The 1920s terraced gardens to Antill Street are well maintained and still intact in form and detail.

The 1885 wing is prominent on Collett Street being on the front site boundary. Minor planting on each side of the north-east elevation provides a good setting for its symmetrical design. There are no street trees on the south-western side of Collett Street and the setting is dominated by a flagstone clad cutting between the gutter and grass verge. The fence to the property on the Antill and Collett Street sides is a cyclone mesh fence between galvanised steel posts and rails.

The spatial curtilage is defined in the north-west by the two elevations of the red brick Mental Health building - Block R and the small lawn area and mature tree within that space. This curtilage is currently defined by Antill and Collett Streets to the nominal south and east. On the west a driveway with entry on Antill Street separates Rusten House from other hospital facilities. East of the driveway there remains a tennis court currently used for car parking. The landform indicates that the natural levels were altered to extend the court surface level out towards Antill Street. The car parking area serves staff and visitors to the hospital facilities which are generally west of the Rusten House area. The car parking area is generally screened by mature trees.

Rusten House

There are two main parts to the building, namely the larger stone section built in 1861 that is back from the road and known formally as Rusten House.

In 1885 a separate Fever Ward was built between Rusten House and Collet Street, facing directly onto that street. There was no direct internal connection between the two buildings, however the narrow space between them has been enclosed and now both buildings are collectively referred to as Rusten House.

Rusten House is a single storey mid-Victorian building divided into two main wards; one for males and one for females.

Original buildings have had many additions and changes, but the original form and character is still apparent. Stone quarried locally, timber verandas, corrugated iron roof.

Other buildings

According to the 2012 GML conservation management plan, a wash house and covered passageway were erected in 1875 and although not clear, it may be that the small brick addition at the western end of Rusten House is the wash house as its detailing is consistent with the period. The location of the covered passageway may have been a covered link to other buildings on the site that have since been demolished.

=== Modifications and dates ===
- 1870: oaks (Quercus sp.), elms (Ulmus procera) and pine (Pinus sp.) trees were planted in the grounds.
- 1871: Thomas Jordan commissioned to build a kitchen with a brick floor
- 1875: a wash house and covered passageway were erected.
- 1876: 2 iron ships' tanks installed to serve as rainwater tanks.
- 1878: tenders to erect guttering and pipes to run water from the roof to the tanks.
- 1885: erected a large ward at the eastern end of the building as a fever ward.
- 1892: hospital land was enclosed by a fence.
- 1895: buildings re-roofed with galvanised iron (the 1861 Rusten House seems to have had a shingled roof prior to re-roofing) and a skylight was installed in the board room.
- 1905: a telephone was installed
- 1907: acetylene gas was installed
- 1921: electricity was installed.
- 1924: plans for a new building drawn up
- 1933: the new hospital opened.
- 2014: asbestos removed from the building and some basic internal works done to arrest structural failings and make minor improvements for prospective users. A number of walls, cladding and pipework were removed.
- 2015: proposal for exterior conservation and repair works, replacement of roofing iron, verandah flooring, minor internal adaptation and remediation works to make it more usable and attractive to a new user.
- 2016-18: refurbishment for the Rusten House Arts Centre
- 2021: Rusten House Art Centre opens to the public

== Heritage listing ==
Rusten House and its surrounding landscape is of considerable historical and architectural significance. It is one of the oldest extant public buildings in Queanbeyan. Rusten house is historically significant as Queanbeyan's second hospital and one that served as the town's public hospital for a period of seventy two years from 1861. The building is also significant for the fact that, from 1911, it was the de facto original hospital for the nation's new federal capital at Canberra. It was the only hospital serving the federal territory for most of the period up to early 1921 and continued to treat patients from Canberra up into the 1930s. As an important public building solidly constructed in stone, the hospital was also a significant early indication of, and contribution to Queanbeyan's development as a major regional centre. The building is an important physical manifestation of the ideology of hospitals and public health in the mid nineteenth century.

- the site has the potential to demonstrate the evolution of a landscape from Late Victorian times to the present, through interpretation of the landscape, planting and archaeological discovery;
- the site has the ability to demonstrate a number of significant social and environmental changes relating to the last 145 years of occupation and use;
- the site has links to the early settlement and development of the Queanbeyan district through the development and use as the second hospital;
- the site has significance by association with Mary Rusten, the first Matron;
- the site has strong links with the local community, particularly with the use of the site for the general hospital: 1861-1933;
- the buildings have aesthetic significance as a distinctive architectural composition in contrasting styles with associated landscape layout and planting.

Old Queanbeyan Hospital was listed on the New South Wales State Heritage Register on 2 April 1999 having satisfied the following criteria.

The place is important in demonstrating the course, or pattern, of cultural or natural history in New South Wales.

Rusten House and its surrounding landscape is of considerable historical and architectural significance. It is one of the oldest extant public buildings in Queanbeyan. Rusten house is historically significant as Queanbeyan's second hospital and one that served as the town's public hospital for a period of seventy two years from 1861. The building is also significant for the fact that, from 1911, it was the de facto original hospital for the nation's new federal capital at Canberra. It was the only hospital serving the federal territory for most of the period up to early 1921 and continued to treat patients from Canberra up into the 1930s.

The place has a strong or special association with a person, or group of persons, of importance of cultural or natural history of New South Wales's history.

Associated with a local historical figure, Mary Rusten, the first matron.

The place is important in demonstrating aesthetic characteristics and/or a high degree of creative or technical achievement in New South Wales.

The building makes a high contribution to the streetscape and is of moderate aesthetic significance.

The place has strong or special association with a particular community or cultural group in New South Wales for social, cultural or spiritual reasons.

The building has special value for the community associated with staffing and the Hospital auxiliary and this is reflected in the multiple voluntary and statutory heritage listings.

The place has potential to yield information that will contribute to an understanding of the cultural or natural history of New South Wales.

The site has the potential to provide relics through archaeological review and assessment.

The place possesses uncommon, rare or endangered aspects of the cultural or natural history of New South Wales.

Rare as one of the oldest extant public buildings in Queanbeyan.

The place is important in demonstrating the principal characteristics of a class of cultural or natural places/environments in New South Wales.

The building has the capacity to demonstrate an intact example of one of the earliest public hospitals in regional NSW.
