= Platinum Jubilee of Elizabeth II =

70th anniversary of the monarch's accession

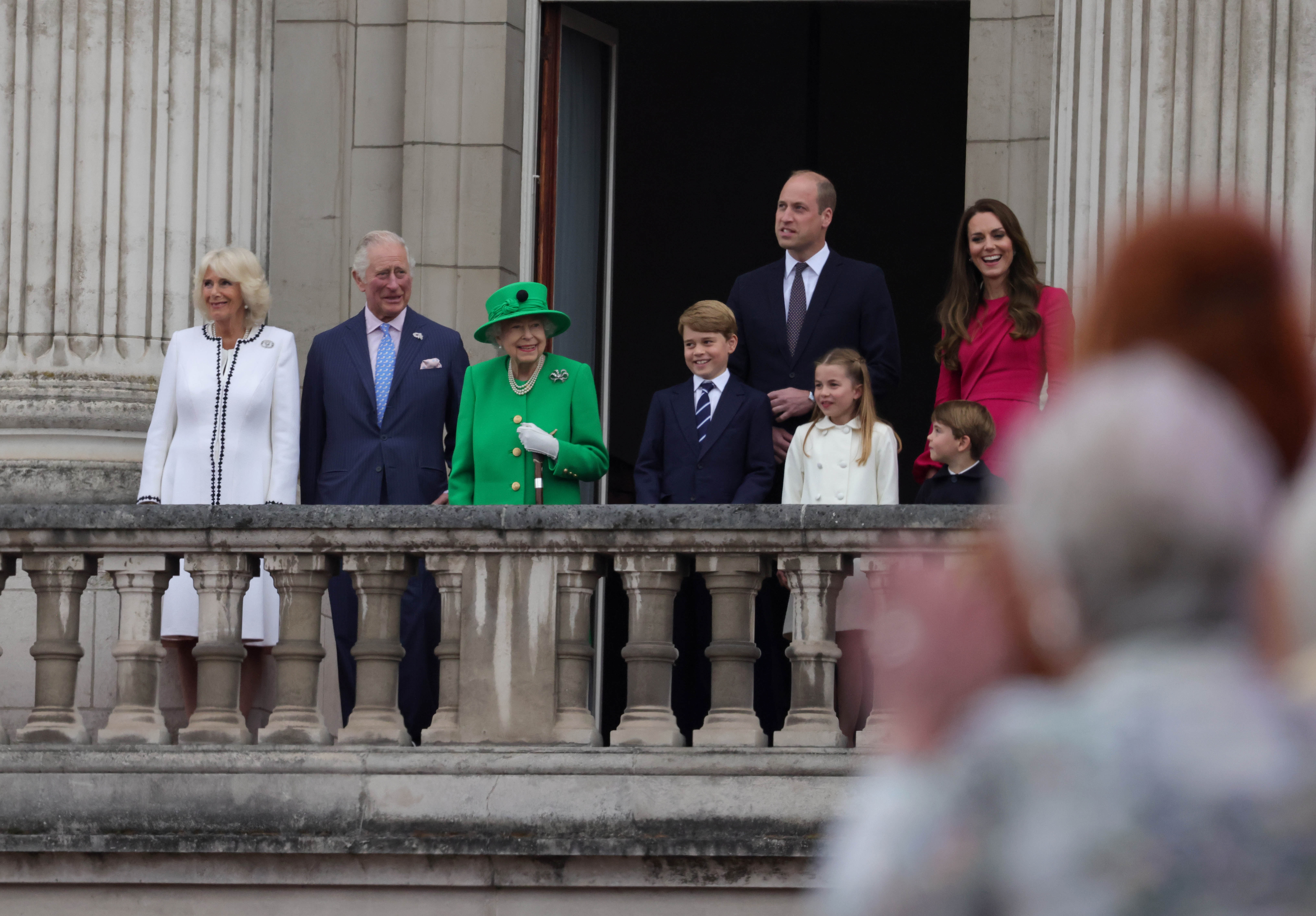
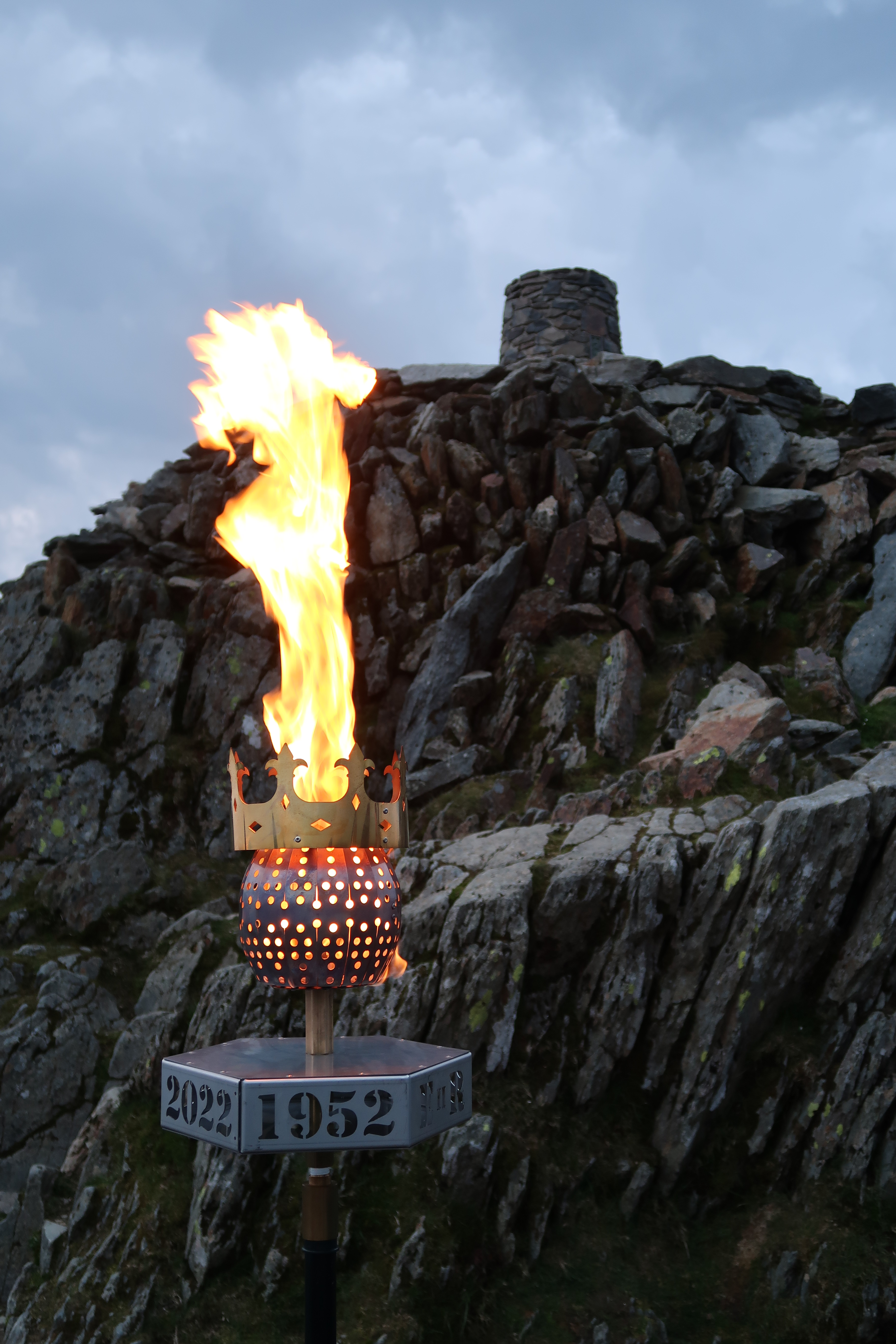
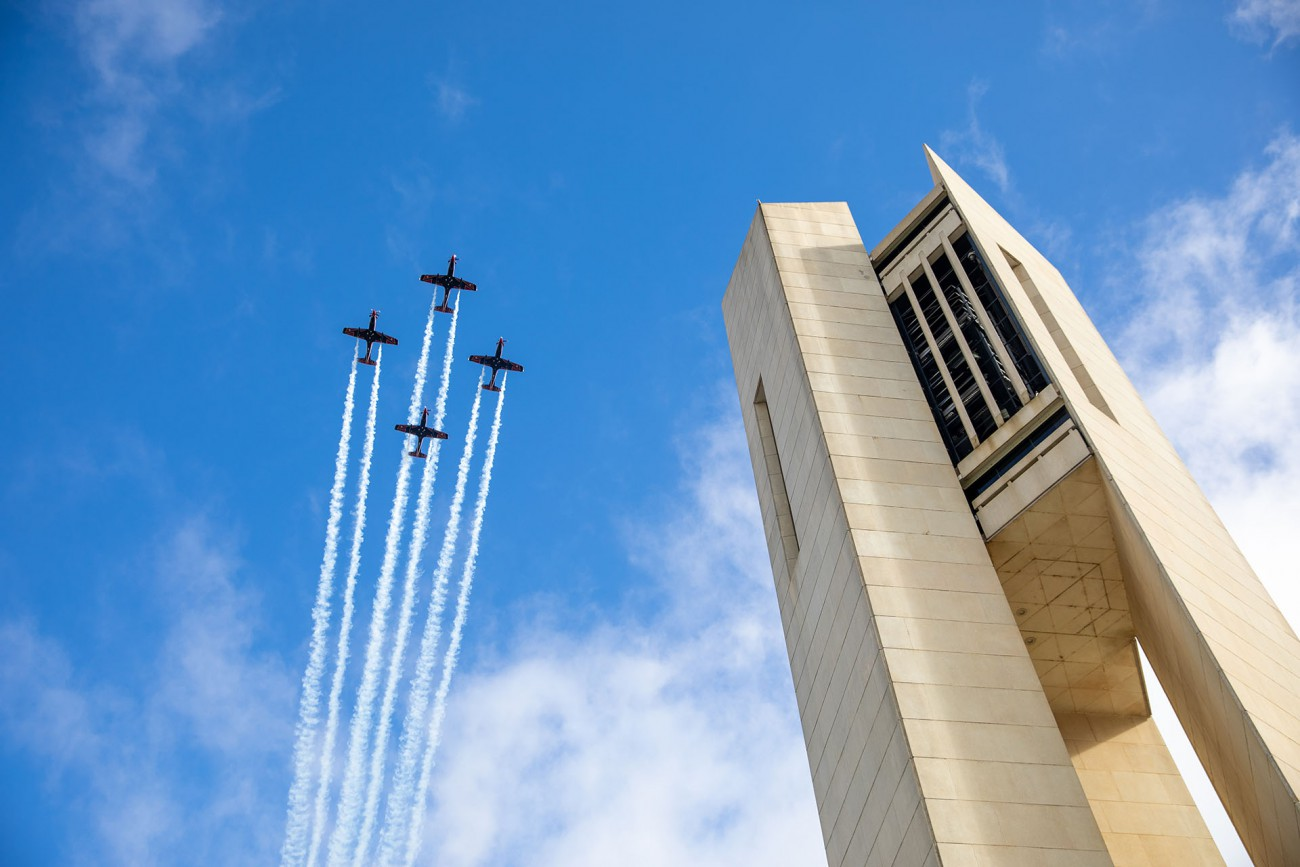
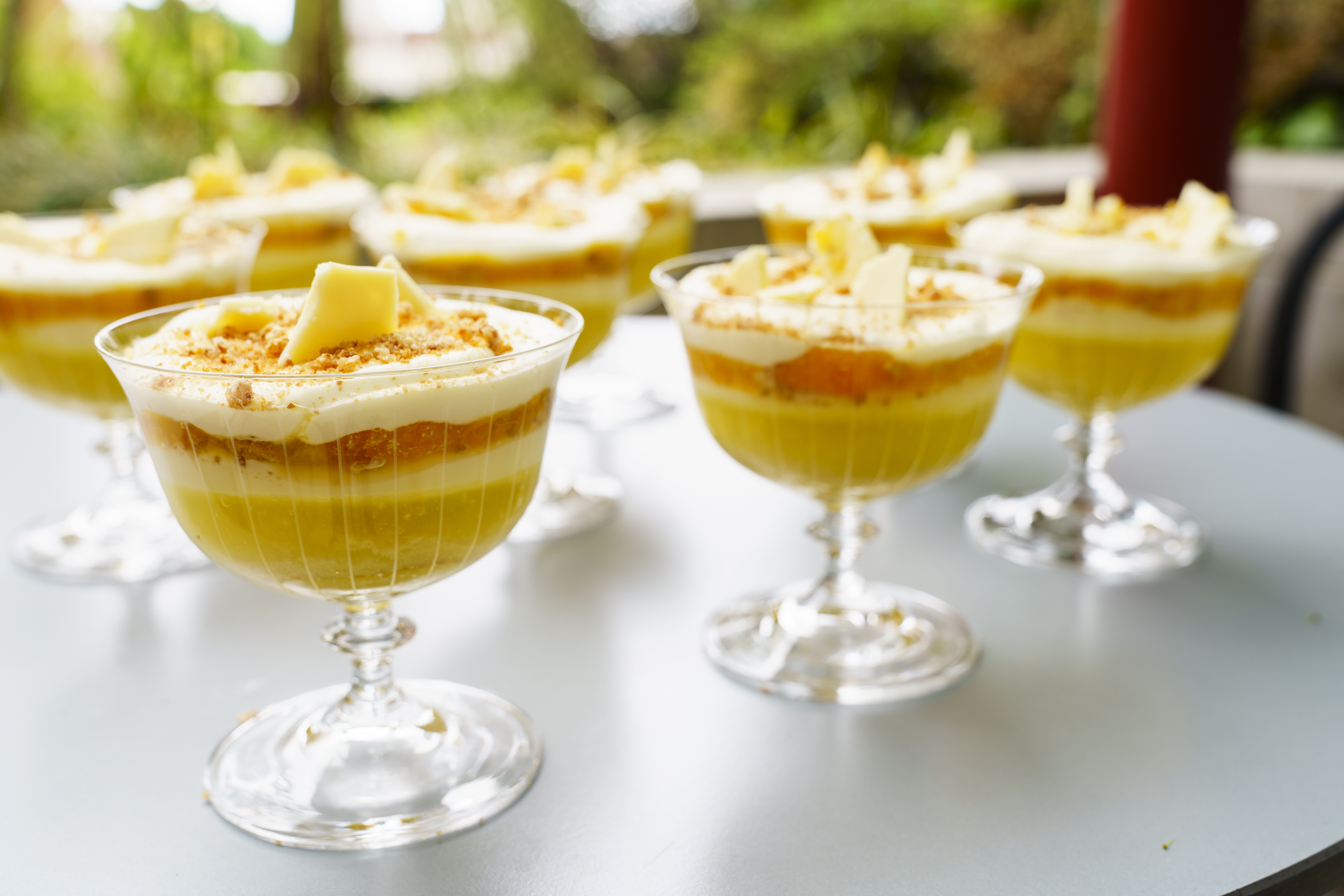
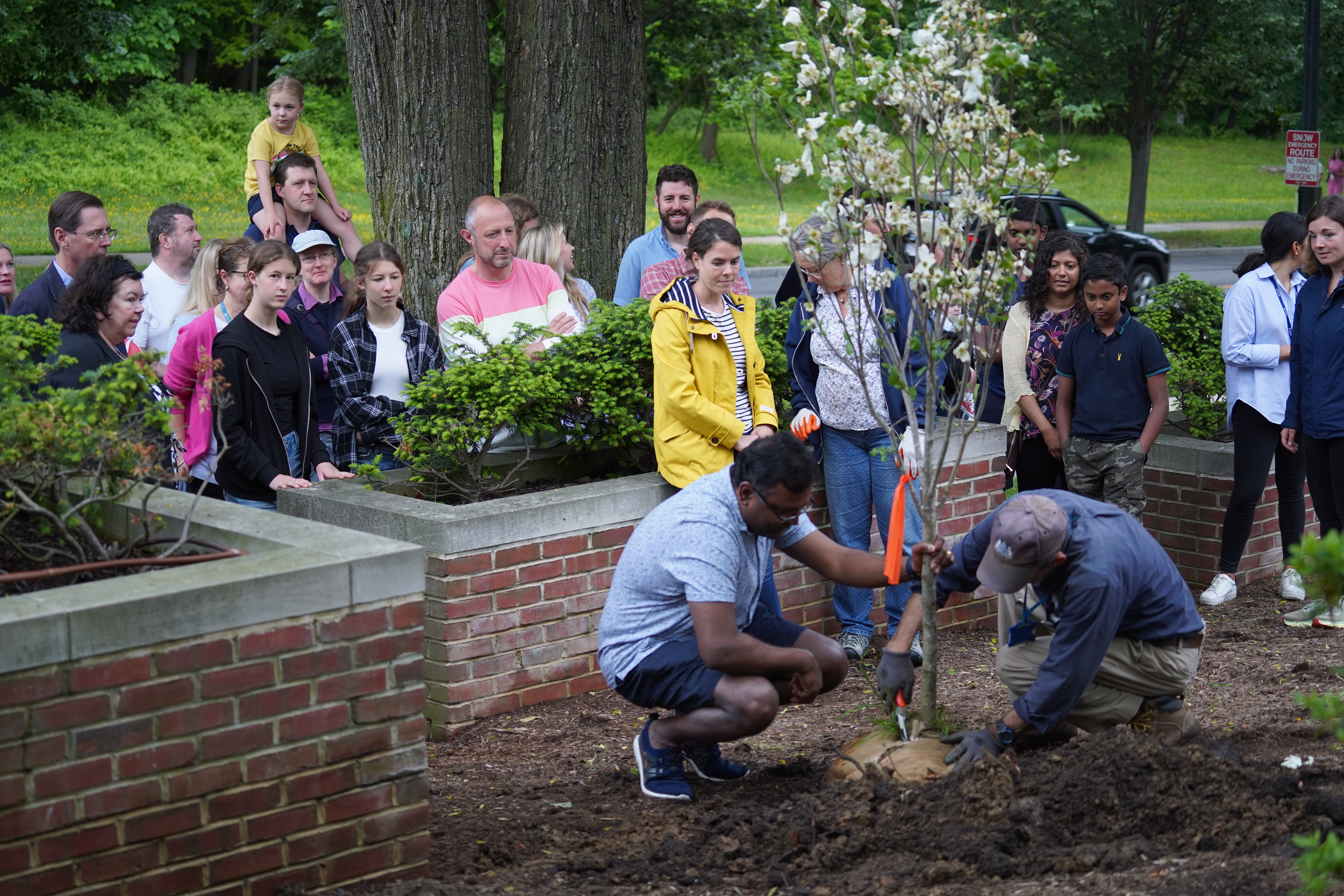
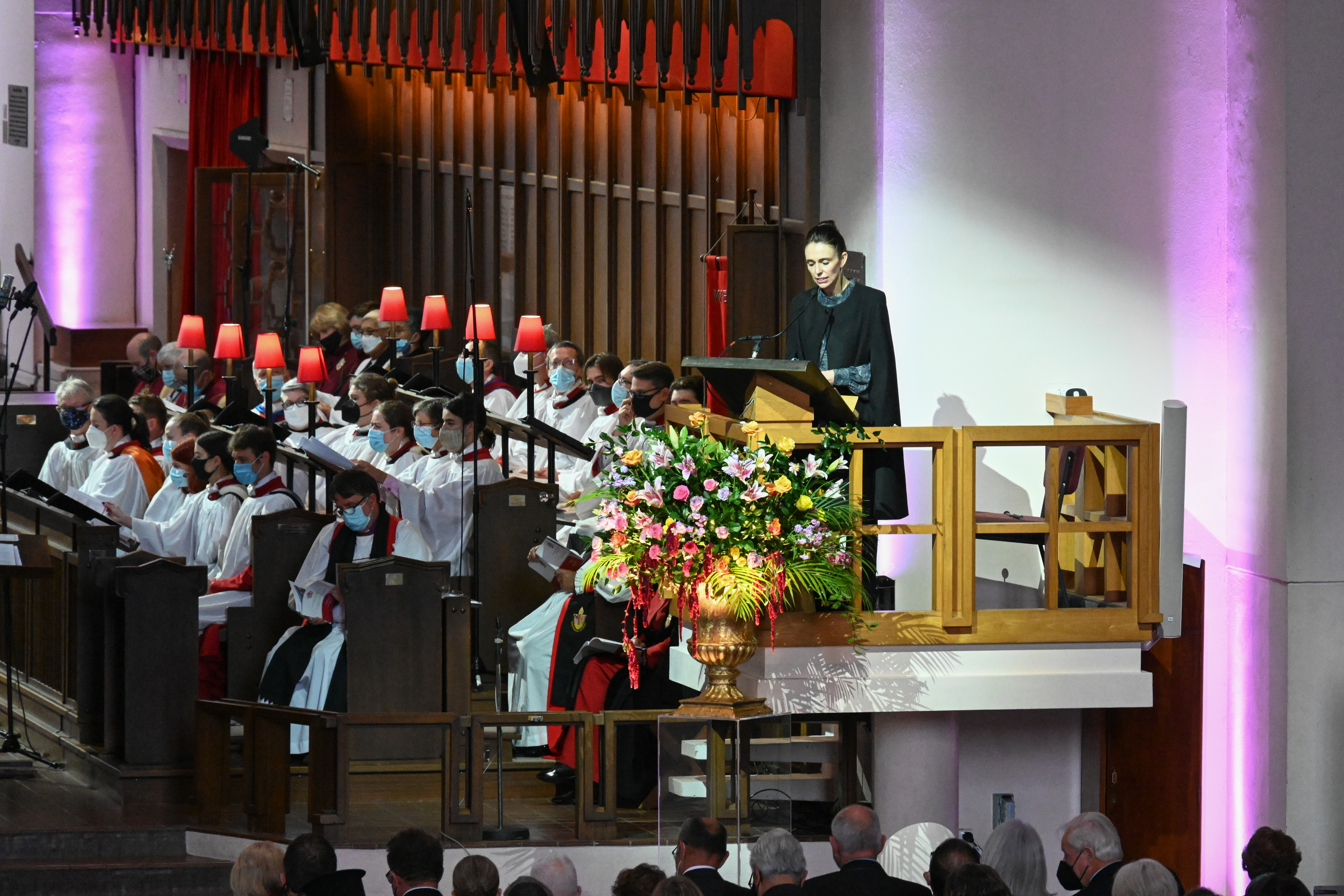
- From top, left to right: Elizabeth II on the balcony of Buckingham Palace; Jubilee beacon at Mount Snowdon, Wales; flyover at renaming ceremony of Queen Elizabeth II Island, Australia; the Platinum Pudding; Families from the British Embassy Washington planting jubilee trees along Massachusetts Avenue; Prime Minister Jacinda Ardern speaking at a Service of Celebration in Wellington, New Zealand
- Genre: Jubilee of the monarch of the United Kingdom and the other Commonwealth realms and Head of the Commonwealth
- Date: 6 February 2022
- Country: United Kingdom; Canada; Australia; New Zealand; Jamaica; The Bahamas; Grenada; Papua New Guinea; Solomon Islands; Tuvalu; Saint Lucia; Saint Vincent and the Grenadines; Belize; Antigua and Barbuda; Saint Kitts and Nevis; Crown Dependencies; British Overseas Territories; Commonwealth of Nations
- Previous event: Sapphire Jubilee of Elizabeth II
- Website: See list

The Platinum Jubilee of Elizabeth II was the international celebration in 2022 marking the 70th and final anniversary of the accession of Queen Elizabeth II on 6 February 1952. It was the first time that any monarch in British history or the other Commonwealth realms celebrated a platinum jubilee. (Note: King Louis XIV reigned for more than 70 years over areas that are today within Canada, but did not celebrate a platinum jubilee.)

Initiatives to commemorate the jubilee were announced by the governments of many realms—including Australia, Canada, New Zealand, Papua New Guinea, and the United Kingdom—and territories, such as the Cayman Islands and Gibraltar, and celebrations were also held in other Commonwealth member states, like the Gambia, Malaysia, Malta, Pakistan, and Samoa. Leaders from across the world, including from China, North Korea, France, Germany, Israel, and the United States, sent messages of congratulations to the Queen on reaching the milestone. In the United Kingdom, there was an extra bank holiday on 3 June and the usual spring bank holiday was moved from the end of May to 2 June to create the four-day Platinum Jubilee Central Weekend from Thursday, 2 June, to Sunday, 5 June. Commemorative stamps and coins were issued by several Commonwealth nations and beacons were lit in every Commonwealth capital for the first time. In many places, trees were planted in the Queen's honour.

The Queen died in her Platinum Jubilee year, on 8 September 2022, at the age of 96. Her funeral took place at Westminster Abbey in London on 19 September 2022 and she was buried at the King George VI Memorial Chapel in Windsor Castle later that day.

== Accession Day 2022 ==
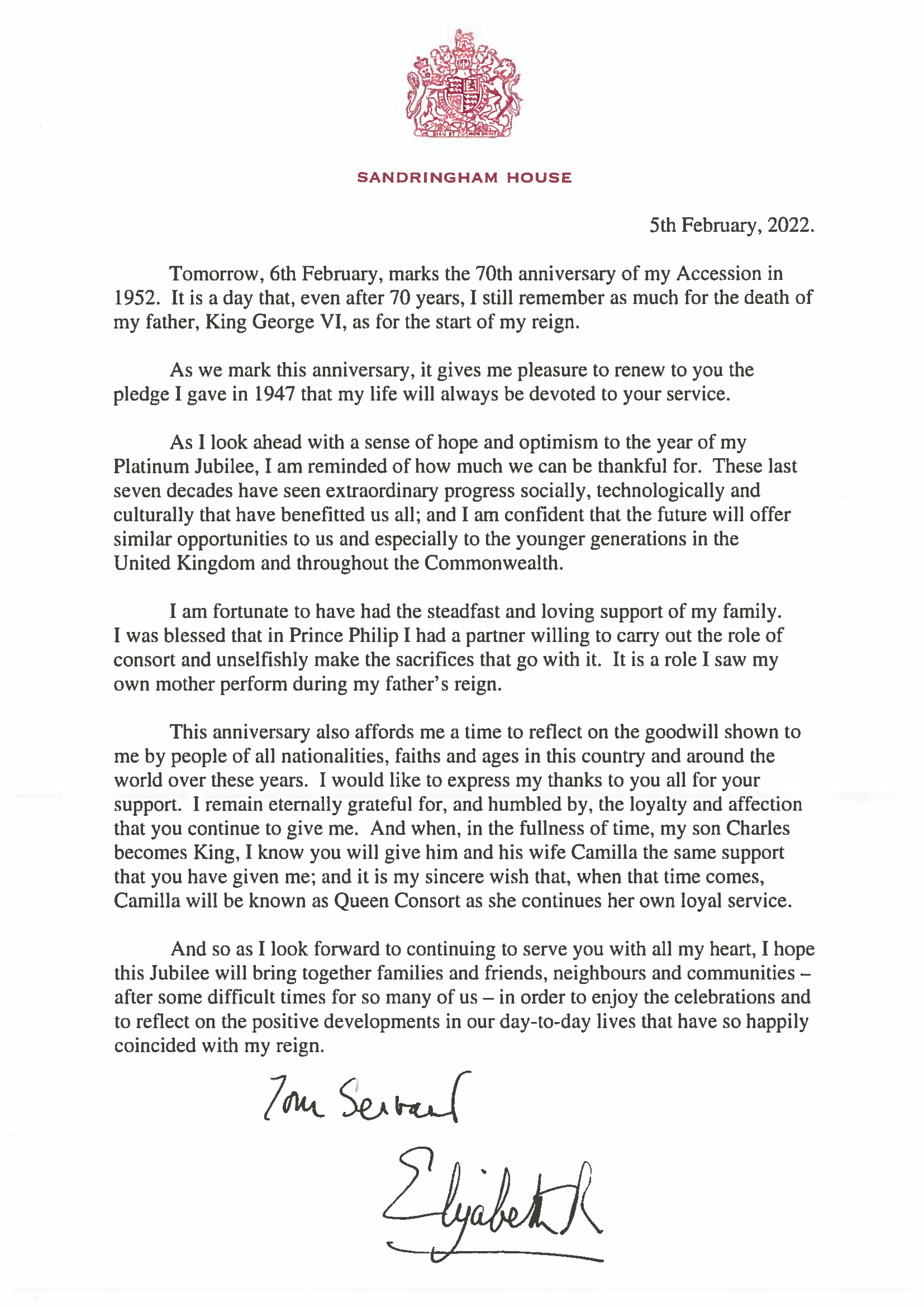
The Queen's Accession Day message released on 5 February 2022

The Jubilee marked the 70th anniversary of the accession of Queen Elizabeth II on 6 February 1952.

In her 2022 Accession Day message, the Queen said that she hoped the platinum jubilee would bring together families and friends, neighbours, and communities. She said that the jubilee "affords me a time to reflect on the goodwill shown to me by people of all nationalities, faiths and ages in this country and around the world over these years". She thanked everyone for their support, loyalty and affection, and signed the message "Your Servant". She said of her 70-year reign and the future:

As I look ahead with a sense of hope and optimism to the year of my platinum jubilee, I am reminded of how much we can be thankful for. These last seven decades have seen extraordinary progress socially, technologically and culturally that have benefitted us all; and I am confident that the future will offer similar opportunities to us and especially to the younger generations in the United Kingdom and throughout the Commonwealth.

Pictures and footage of the Queen working from her red boxes at Sandringham House were released. The then-Prince of Wales said that the Queen's devotion to the welfare of all her people inspired still greater admiration with each passing year.

Tributes and messages of congratulations came from foreign leaders, including United States president Joe Biden, Chinese leader Xi Jinping, German chancellor Olaf Scholz, King of Sweden Carl XVI Gustaf, Israeli president Isaac Herzog, UAE president Sheikh Khalifa bin Zayed Al Nahyan, King of Thailand Vajiralongkorn, King of Morocco Mohammed VI, and Vietnamese president Nguyễn Xuân Phúc. A congratulatory message was also sent from Margareta, Custodian of the Crown of Romania.

== Jubilee emblems ==
Emblem in the United Kingdom

Canadian emblem

Australian emblem

Emblem in New Zealand

=== United Kingdom ===
The emblem for the platinum jubilee in the United Kingdom was announced in August 2021, following a competition which was judged by industry experts. The winning design was created by 19-year-old graphic design student Edward Roberts from Nottinghamshire.

The regal purple used in the emblem has been closely matched to the purple in the Queen's Robe of Estate, worn by her at the Coronation in 1953. A continuous platinum line in the shape of St Edward's Crown features the number "70" at the top of the Crown, signifying the Queen's 70-year reign and her platinum jubilee. Roberts included a circle to border the Crown, to create the impression of a royal seal. The emblem's typeface is Perpetua, which means "forever", and is similar to the font style that appeared on the Queen's Coronation Order of Service in 1953.

=== Canada ===
The Canadian platinum jubilee emblem includes Elizabeth II's royal cypher above a numeral 70 in light-grey, the colour alluding to platinum. The cypher and numeral are surrounded by a seven-sided figure, adorned with seven maple leaves and pearls, representing each decade of the Queen's reign. Multiple elements also symbolise celebration, with the rounded edges being shaped like a flower petal and the maple leaves being positioned in a manner that resembles fireworks.

=== Australia ===
The Australian Platinum Jubilee Emblem was unveiled by the Australian Government in March 2022. The emblem can be used for official and recognised events in Australia to celebrate the jubilee. The design is a stylised representation of the Queen's Wattle Spray Brooch, which was gifted to the Queen during her first visit to Australia in 1954. The emblem contains three colours – platinum, gold and purple. The platinum colour represents the Queen's 70 years on the throne, and the purple colour symbolises royalty. The gold is drawn from the golden wattle, Australia's national floral emblem. The font used is Perpetua, which means 'forever', which acknowledges that the Queen was Australia's "first platinum" monarch.

=== New Zealand ===
On Accession Day, the New Zealand platinum jubilee emblem was unveiled. The emblem, approved by the Queen, was prepared by Phillip O'Shea, New Zealand Herald of Arms. Within a platinum five-sided frame is the Queen's royal cypher, with the Māori inscription "Te Hokotoru Mā Ngahuru", which means "three twenties plus ten", an allusion to the Queen's 70-year reign. In the base, the years 1952 and 2022 are in gold and placed on the poutama (step) design in the traditional colours of red-ochre and white. The design represents "steps of service", namely, the seven decades of public service by the Queen.

== Celebrations throughout the Commonwealth ==
The celebration plans were announced by Buckingham Palace on 10 January 2022.

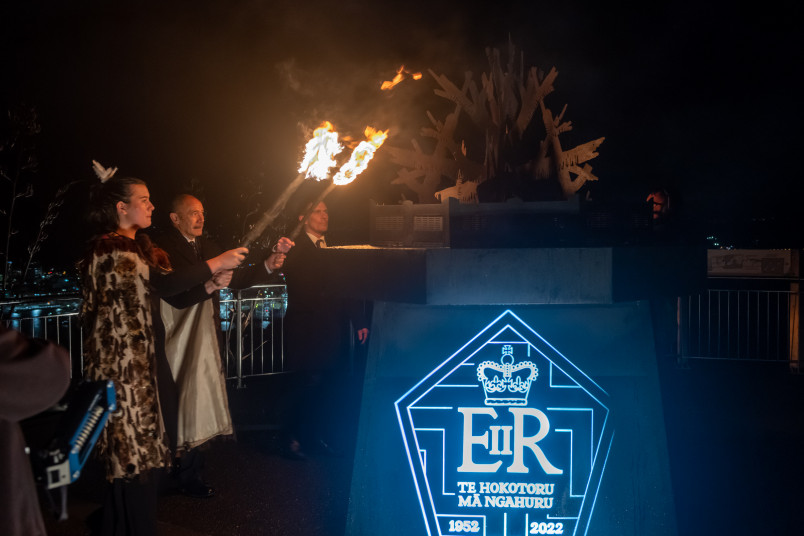
Jubilee beacon lit in New Zealand

For the first time, jubilee beacons were lit in every capital city of each Commonwealth country.

The Royal Mint and the Royal Canadian Mint partnered to create a two-coin set, with each mint designing a coin for the set. The silver coin designed by the Royal Mint has an equestrian portrait of the Queen on the reverse and a royal mantle on the obverse. The silver coin designed by the Royal Canadian Mint has a reverse design that depicts the Queen in 1952, while the obverse has the effigy of the Queen used on Canadian coins since 2003.

The Commonwealth Day Service at Westminster Abbey on 14 March reflected the jubilee with a special focus on the role that service plays in the lives of people and communities across the Commonwealth.

Members of the Royal Family undertook a series of royal tours of Commonwealth countries. The governors-general of Antigua and Barbuda, Australia, Belize, Canada, Grenada, Jamaica, New Zealand, Papua New Guinea, and Saint Lucia travelled to the United Kingdom in June to represent their respective countries at jubilee festivities.

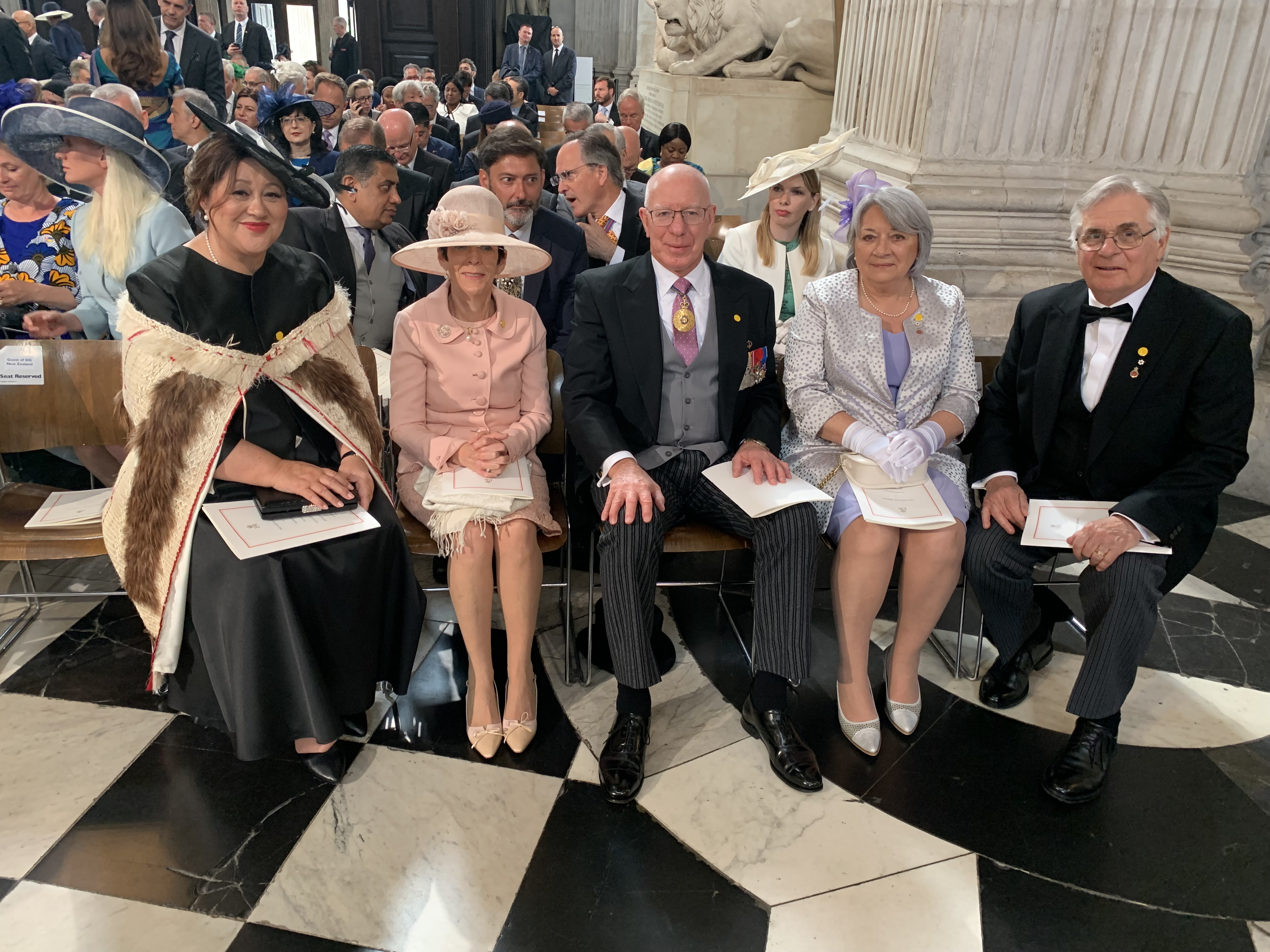
Left to right: Governor-General of New Zealand Dame Cindy Kiro; Linda McMartin, spouse of David Hurley; Governor-General of Australia David Hurley; Governor General of Canada Mary Simon, and Simon's spouse, Whit Fraser at St Paul's Cathedral, London, for the Service of Thanksgiving for the Platinum Jubilee of Queen Elizabeth II on 3 June 2022

In the evening of 1 June, the official jubilee photograph of the Queen was released. The portrait, by Ranald Mackechnie, was taken in the Victoria Vestibule at Windsor Castle on 25 May. The photo shows the Queen in a blue dress, with the statue of Charles II seen behind a window in the background.

In a special message, the Queen said "many happy memories will be created" over the next four days. She thanked everyone involved in convening communities, families, neighbours and friends to mark the Jubilee.

Following the platinum jubilee weekend, the Queen released a thank you message in which she said:

When it comes to how to mark seventy years as your Queen, there is no guidebook to follow. It really is a first. But I have been humbled and deeply touched that so many people have taken to the streets to celebrate my platinum jubilee. While I may not have attended every event in person, my heart has been with you all; and I remain committed to serving you to the best of my ability, supported by my family.

The Queen's Baton for the 2022 Commonwealth Games featured a platinum strand along its length.

=== United Kingdom ===
This is the first time that any British monarch has celebrated a platinum jubilee.

There was an extra bank holiday on 3 June and the usual Spring bank holiday was moved from the end of May to 2 June, to create the platinum jubilee bank holiday weekend from 2 to 5 June. The British government promised a "once-in-a-generation show" that would "mix the best of British ceremonial splendour and pageantry with cutting-edge artistic and technological displays". The March 2021 budget allocated £28 million to fund Jubilee celebrations, which did not include the cost of the extra bank holiday. In an August 2021 impact assessment report, the British government estimated a £2.39 billion loss in GDP due to business closures during the extra bank holiday.

The jubilee was expected to bring a £1.2 billion boost to the UK economy. The Centre for Retail Research estimated that consumers in the United Kingdom would spend $356 million on Platinum Jubilee memorabilia. In July 2022, it was reported that retail sales dipped by 0.1% in June despite jubilee celebrations, which was less than what was expected amid the economic crisis, but still showed a downward trajectory. The food sector was the only sector that saw sales volumes spike by 3.1%.

==== Queen's Green Canopy ====
The Queen's Green Canopy campaign was launched in May 2021. The campaign invites people from the United Kingdom to plant a tree to make the local environment greener, and serve as a "special gift" to the Queen. By March 2022 more than one million trees had been planted.

A 70 ft (21 m) sculpture called 'Tree of Trees' was erected outside Buckingham Palace for the June celebrations. The sculpture, which contains 350 native British trees in the form of one giant tree, reflects the more than one million trees planted during the Green Canopy initiative. The trees were gifted to selected community groups for planting after the celebrations.

==== Jubilee stamps and coins ====
The Royal Mint released one of the largest ever commemorative collections, including commemorative £5 crowns and 50p coins; the first time a royal event has been commemorated on a 50p coin. The 50p coin is designed to feature the Queen's royal cypher within the 0 of the number 70 on the reverse. The £5 crown features the quartered shield of the Royal Arms on the reverse. Both coins show the Queen on horseback on the obverse.

The Royal Mint also produced a 220 mm (8.7 in) diameter 15 kg (33 lb) coin, which was commissioned by a private UK collector. It is the largest coin the Mint has ever produced. The £15,000 denomination coin was designed by coinage artist John Bergdahl and took nearly 400 hours to make. The obverse features a commemorative design depicting the Queen on horseback, while the reverse depicts the Queen's cypher surrounded by floral emblems of the four nations of the United Kingdom.

The Mint also released a new series of three coins, titled The Queen's Reign. The first coin focuses on the Queen's role as the 'fountain of honour'. The second coin highlights the Queen's role as patron of numerous charities. The third coin celebrates the Queen's role as Head of the Commonwealth, an organisation that she calls her "family of nations". Each coin in the collection features the Queen's signature in the centre; the first time that her signature has been featured on UK coinage. The coins were designed by Irish artist and illustrator P. J. Lynch, who was "inspired by the Queen's hands and the work they represent".

In February 2022, the Royal Mail released eight new stamps. The new set of stamps features photographs of the Queen throughout her reign, which commemorate different aspects of her royal duties, from the Trooping the Colour to worldwide tours.

==== Events leading up to June ====
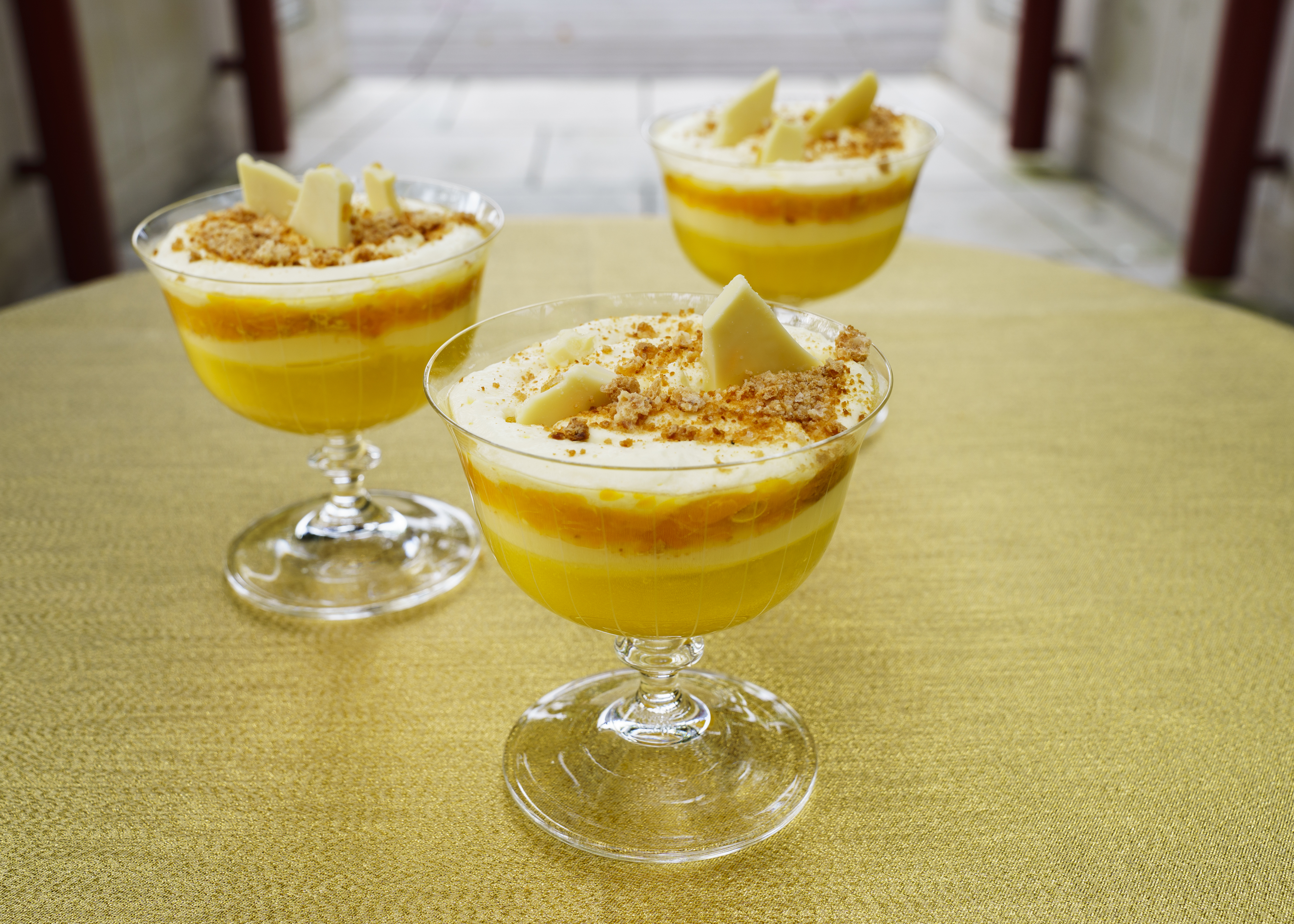
Platinum Puddings displayed at a British Library event in May 2022

The Platinum Pudding competition was launched on 10 January 2022 by The Big Jubilee Lunch and Fortnum & Mason throughout the United Kingdom to find a pudding to celebrate the Jubilee. Five finalists were selected to prepare their creations for a judging panel, with the winning recipe being made available to the public at Big Jubilee Lunches during the Jubilee weekend. The winning recipe, by Jemma Melvin from Southport, is a lemon Swiss roll and Amaretti trifle. The winner was announced on 12 May in the BBC One documentary The Jubilee Pudding: 70 Years in the Baking, with the Duchess of Cornwall in attendance.

On 4 February, pictures and footage taken two weeks earlier in Windsor Castle's Oak Room were released, featuring the Queen viewing memorabilia from this and prior jubilees. The display included a golden jubilee letter from a nine-year-old boy named Chris, titled A Recipe for a Perfect Queen, which includes ingredients of "jewels, posh gowns, loyalty, hard work, healthiness, and courage". On 5 February, the Queen hosted a reception at Sandringham House for volunteer groups, pensioners and members of the local Women's Institute group. At the reception, the Queen met Angela Wood, a former cookery student who helped create the original recipe for Coronation chicken in 1953. The Queen's Accession Day message was released later that evening.

On Accession Day, Prime Minister Boris Johnson, the Leader of the Opposition Sir Keir Starmer, and the Archbishop of Canterbury Justin Welby were among notable figures releasing statements congratulating the Queen. Tributes were also paid by former British prime ministers. Outdoor billboards across the United Kingdom, including Piccadilly Circus, were lit up. Special services were held in cathedrals. In Exeter Cathedral, the choir sang an anthem written for Queen Elizabeth I by the 16th century English composer William Byrd.

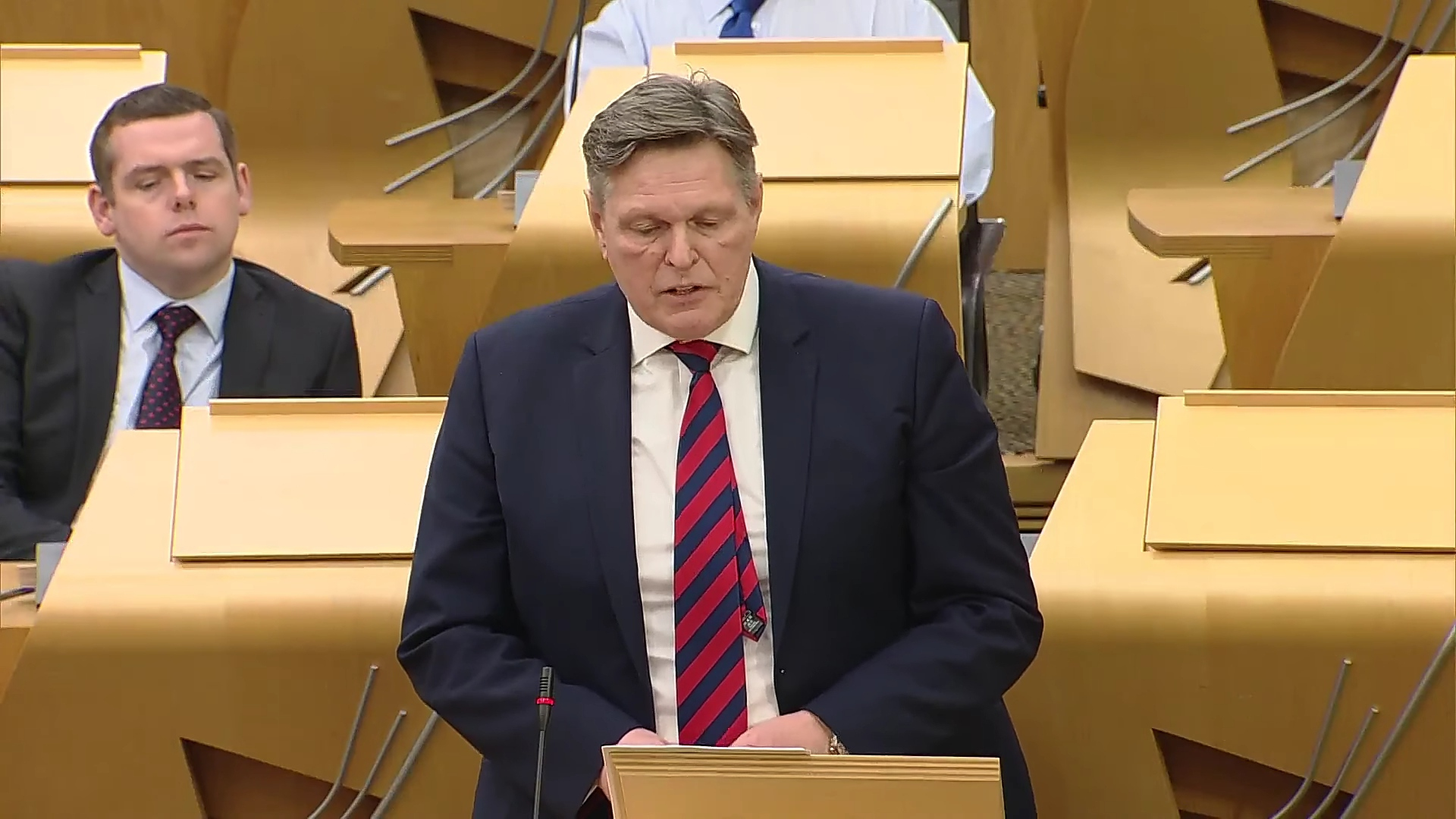
Stephen Kerr congratulating the Queen at the Scottish parliament, 9 February 2022

Gun salutes were held on 7 February, the anniversary of the accession. A 41-gun salute was fired by the King's Troop, Royal Horse Artillery in London's Green Park. At the Tower of London, the Honourable Artillery Company fired 62 rounds. A 21-gun salute was fired at Edinburgh Castle by 105th Regiment Royal Artillery. In Wales, a gun-salute was fired in the grounds of Cardiff Castle, organised by 160th (Welsh) Brigade. In Northern Ireland, the Reservists of 206 (Ulster) Battery Royal Artillery fired a 21-gun salute at Hillsborough Castle.

On 16 March, a concert titled The Queen's Platinum Jubilee – 70 Years took place at the Royal Albert Hall. The event featured music from the Queen's coronation and other key moments of her reign, performed by the Royal Philharmonic Orchestra. Prince and Princess Michael of Kent were in attendance.

The Lord Mayor's Platinum Jubilee Big Curry Lunch took place at the Guildhall, London, on 7 April. Princesses Beatrice and Eugenie attended the event.

On four evenings from 12 to 15 May, the 2022 Royal Windsor Horse Show at Windsor Castle, titled A Gallop Through History, concluded with a 90-minute celebration in tribute to the Queen, featuring 500 horses and 1,000 dancers, with various members of the Royal Family, including Duke and Duchess of Gloucester, the Earl and Countess of Wessex and Forfar, and the Princess Royal in attendance. Princess Beatrice and her husband, Edoardo Mapelli Mozzi, also attended the charity preview of the event. The Queen attended on 15 May. The Queen's youngest granddaughter, Lady Louise Mountbatten-Windsor, drove in the carriage that once belonged to her grandfather, the Duke of Edinburgh, and had been featured in his funeral. Actors Helen Mirren and Tom Cruise were involved, with Mirren playing Queen Elizabeth I.

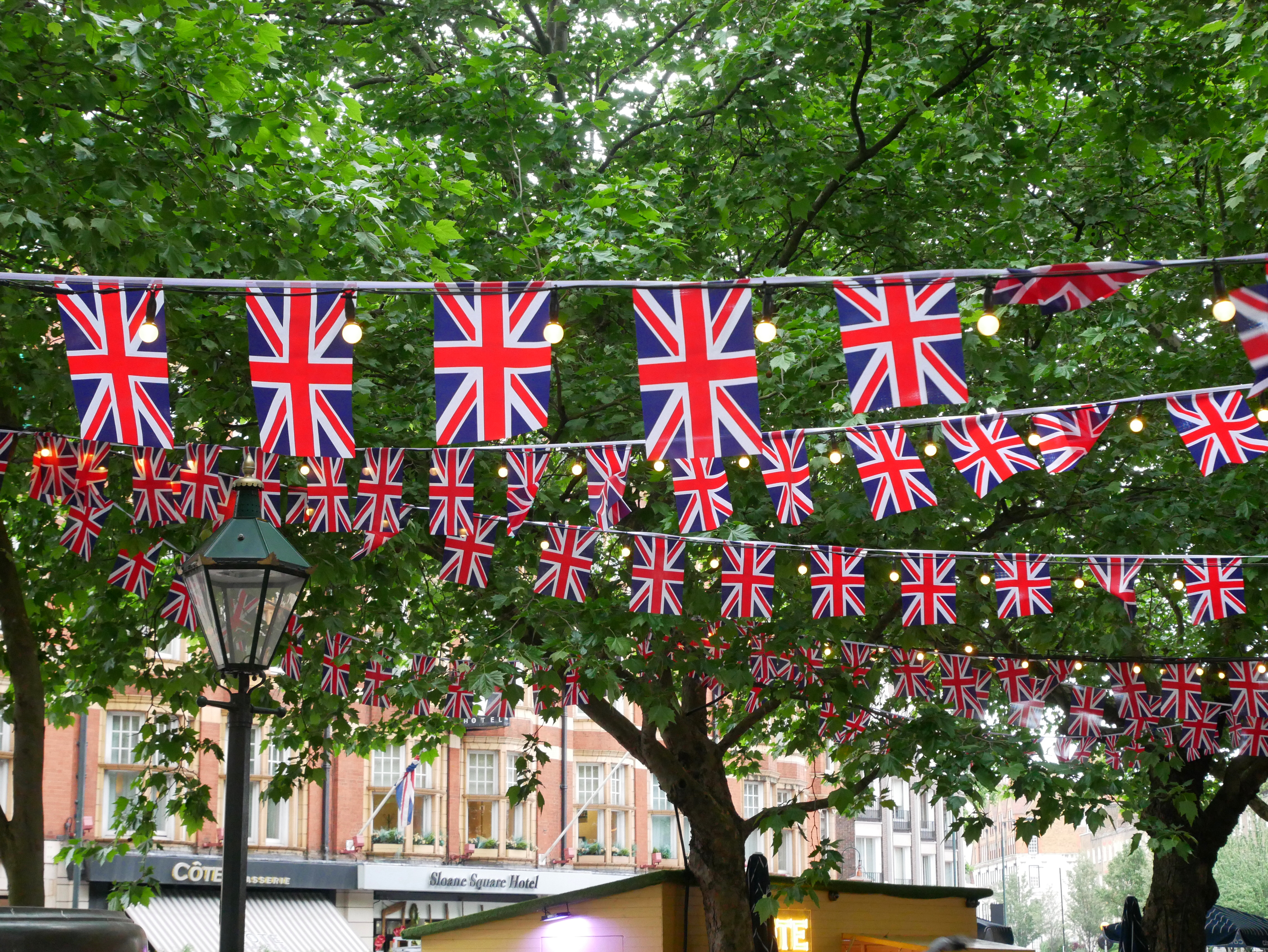
Union flag buntings in Sloane Square, May 2022

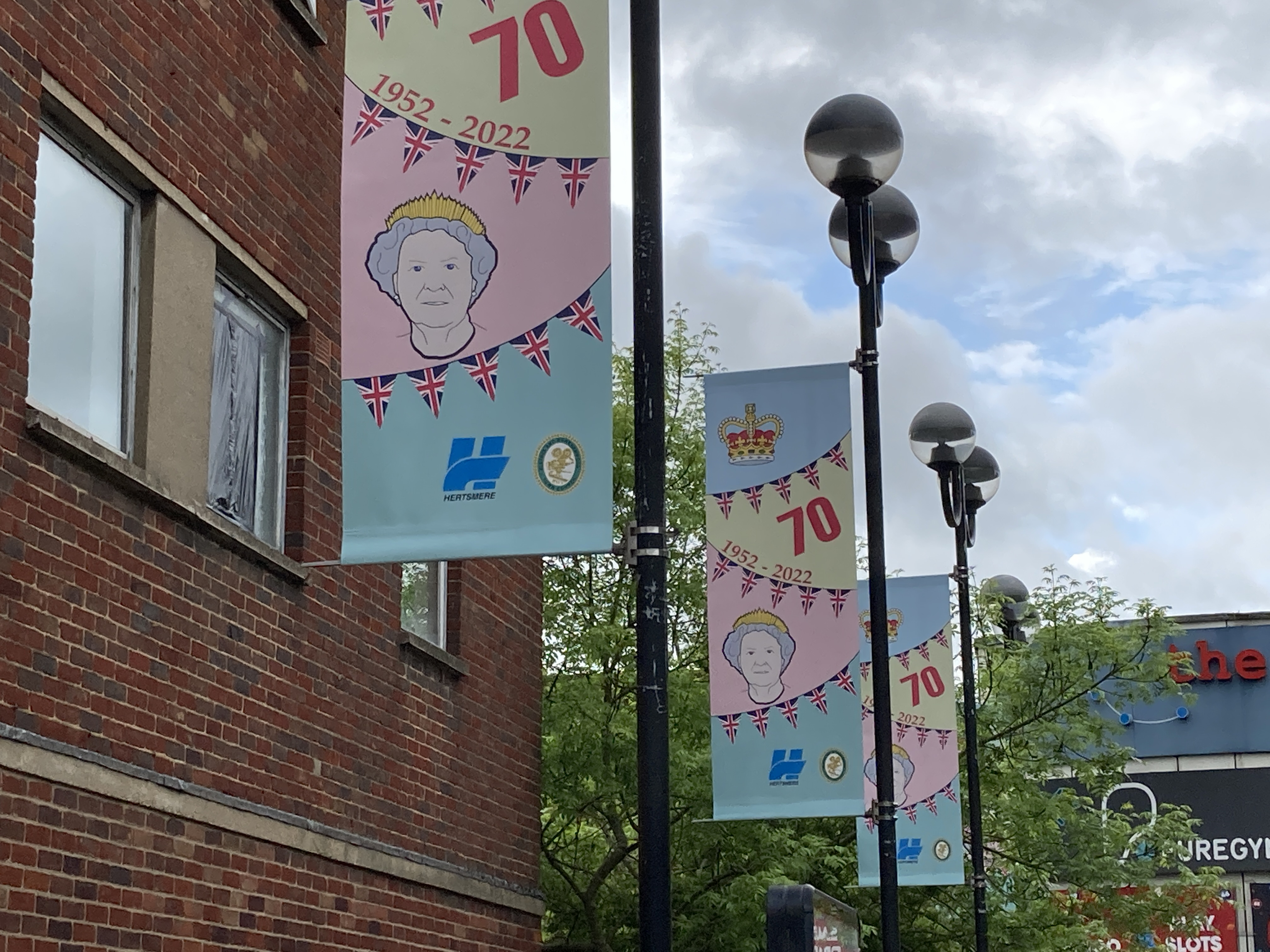
Platinum jubilee banners in Borehamwood, May 2022

On 13 May, a 550-mile (890 km) torch relay across Suffolk began. Starting in Brandon, The relay travelled 250 towns and villages, ending at the Suffolk Show in Ipswich on 1 June.

On 23 May, the Queen visited the Chelsea Flower Show, which featured four commemorative installations. In The Queen's Platinum Jubilee Garden, laser-cut steel silhouettes of the Queen were featured, surrounded by 70 planted terracotta pots planted with Lily of the valley, the Queen's favourite flower. At the show, display of roses, featuring new cultivars created to mark the jubilee, won a gold medal. The exhibit, by Shropshire-based grower David Austin Roses, featured pink-apricot roses named Elizabeth.

On 24 May, the Senedd passed a motion to congratulate the Queen. First Minister Mark Drakeford said the jubilee events in Wales would be "an indication of the deep respect in which the Queen is held, and an expression of the gratitude for her many years of selfless service". Conservative leader Andrew RT Davies said she had held Wales "deeply in her heart" over her 70-year reign. Plaid Cymru leader Adam Price praised the "empathy" the Queen had shown after the 1966 Aberfan disaster.

On 26 May, both Houses of Parliament debated a Humble Address to congratulate the Queen. Prime Minister Boris Johnson said the United Kingdom would "show with every bonfire, every concert and street party, and every aerobatic display a love and devotion to reciprocate the love, devotion and leadership she has shown to the whole country over seven decades". He said:

She has seen an empire transformed into a happy Commonwealth that countries are now bidding to join. In the thousand-year history of this place, no monarch has seen such an increase in the longevity, prosperity or opportunity — or the freedom — of the British people. No monarch has seen such technical advances, in many of which British scientists have played a leading part, from the dawn of the internet to the use of the world's first approved covid vaccine. No monarch, by their efforts, dedication and achievement, better deserves the attribute of greatness. For me, she is already Elizabeth the Great.

A new BBC documentary, Elizabeth: The Unseen Queen, aired on 29 May. The film includes unseen footage from the Queen's archive, and is narrated by the Queen herself.

In late May, the Reading-based Republic group put on posters with the slogan "Make Elizabeth the Last" in different regions within the UK, using £43,000 garnered from crowdfunding.

From 30 May to 3 June, HMY Britannia hosted 65 former crew members for Yotties Week. Celebrations included celebratory dishes and cocktails in the Royal Deck Tea Room, musical entertainment for visitors in the State Apartments on 2 June, and a city-wide Corgi Treasure Hunt.

Nicola Sturgeon speaking in the Scottish Parliament, 1 June 2022

On 1 June, the First Minister of Scotland Nicola Sturgeon moved a motion in the Scottish Parliament congratulating the Queen. She said that the Scottish Government would present the Queen with a limited edition Johnnie Walker whisky, with a special design to celebrate the beauty of Scotland's flora and fauna, and a throw made from the tartan commissioned in honour of the three bridges across the River Forth.

Schools and nurseries across the UK organised events and parties. St Paul's C.E Primary School in Oldham organised a re-enactment of the Queen's coronation in 1953.

==== Central weekend ====
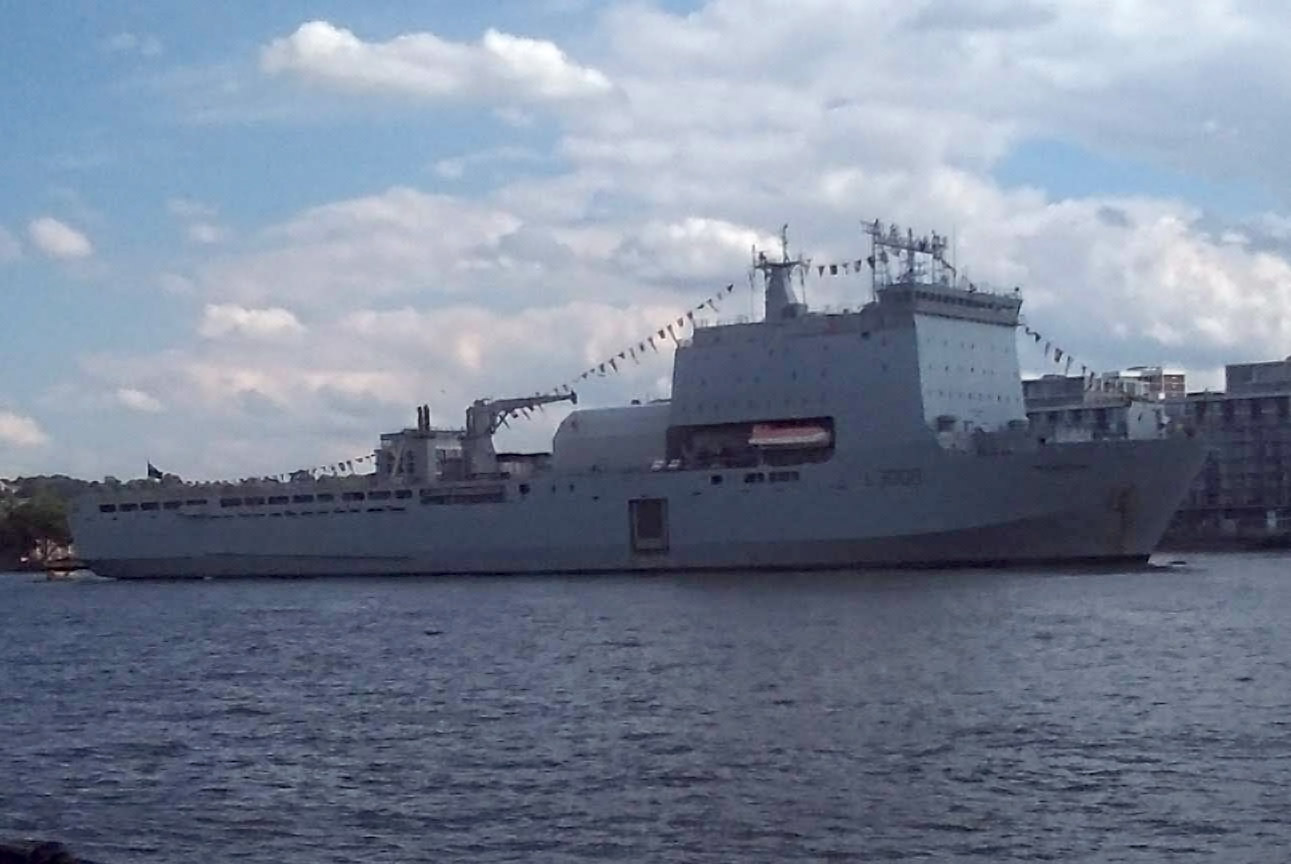
RFA Mounts Bay moored at Greenwich in London during the jubilee weekend

The late May bank holiday was moved to Thursday 2 June with an additional bank holiday on Friday 3 June, making a four-day weekend.

Big screens were placed in The Mall, London, Edinburgh's Princes Street Gardens and in Cardiff's Bute Park for members of the public to watch the events taking place across the bank holiday weekend. Members of the Royal Family also carried out engagements across the UK during the bank holiday weekend, however, the Prince of Wales and the Duchess of Cornwall were expected to remain in England.

More than 16,000 street parties were expected to be held over the weekend.

In England and Wales, pubs, clubs and bars were allowed to stay open for extra two hours each day from Thursday to Saturday. During the weekend, Sandringham House and Balmoral Castle were open to visitors, and the Manchester Flower Show featured royal-themed displays.

===== 2 June =====
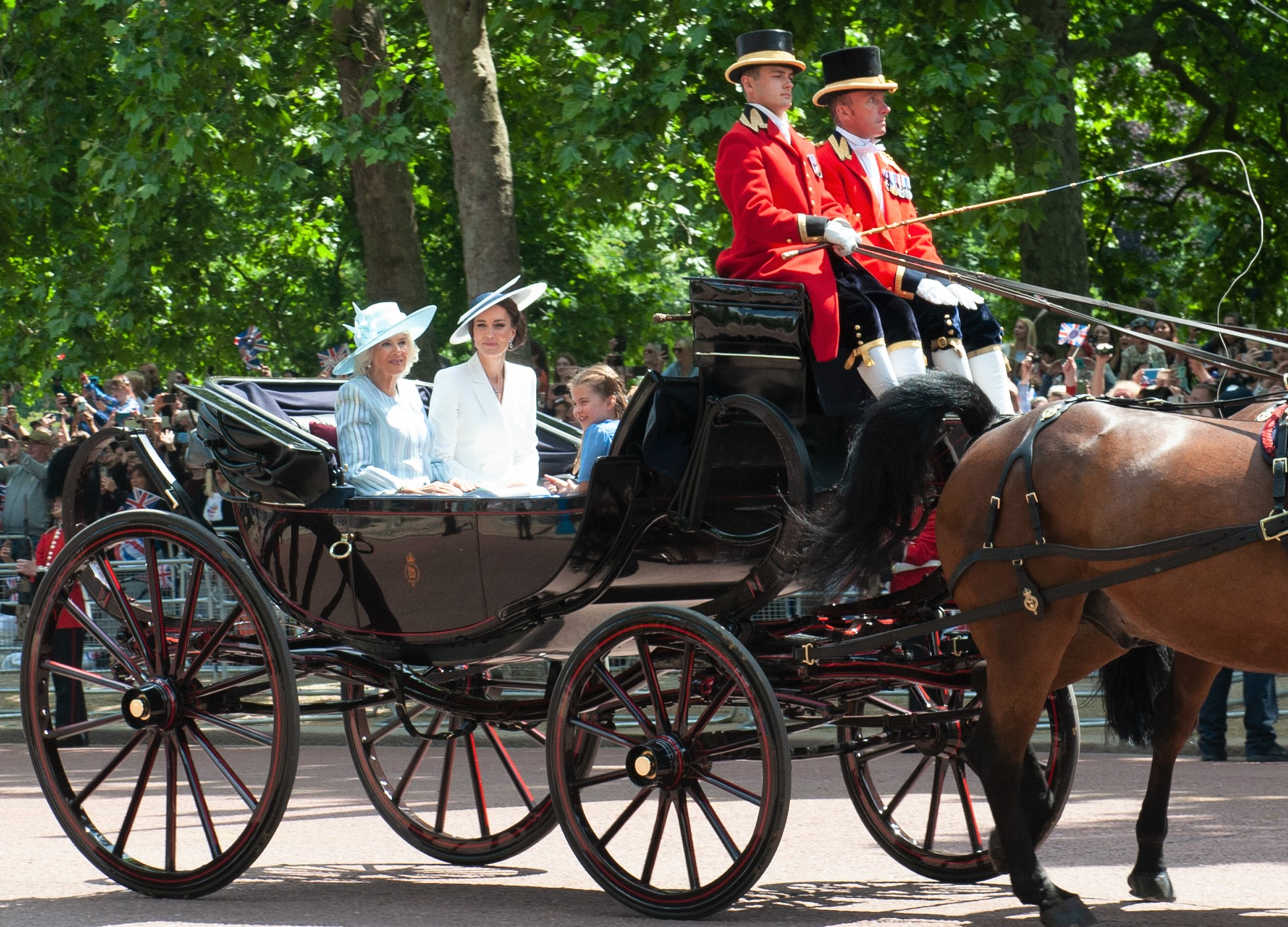
The Duchess of Cornwall and the Duchess of Cambridge riding in a carriage at Trooping the Colour

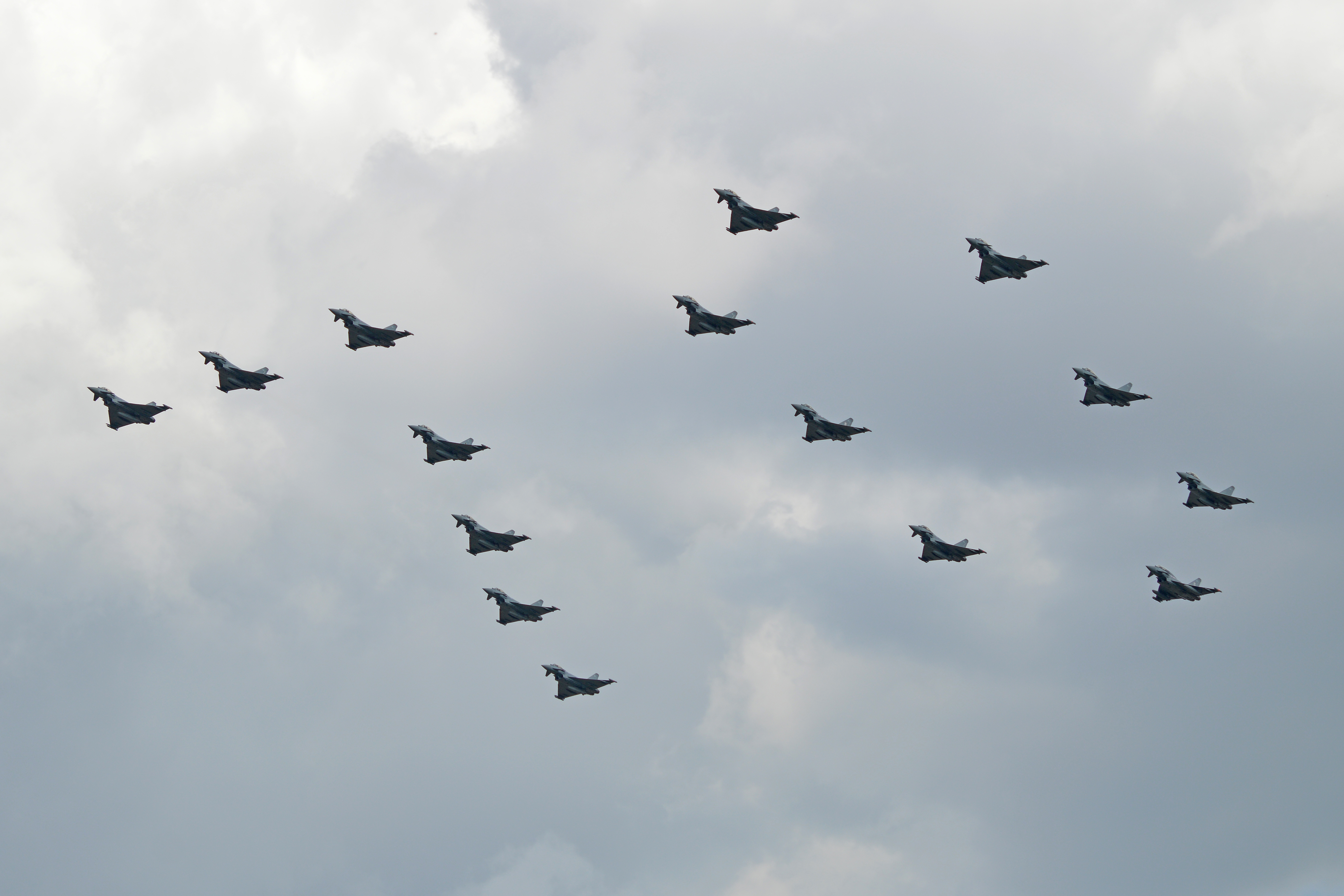
The Platinum Jubilee Flypast; fifteen RAF Eurofighter Typhoons making the figure "70".

The Queen's birthday parade, also known as Trooping the Colour, which usually takes place on the second Saturday of June, was held on Thursday, 2 June. Over 1,400 parading soldiers, 200 horses and 400 musicians came together in the traditional parade. The event closed with the Queen and Royal Family observing a flypast from the balcony of Buckingham Palace. The balcony was "limited to Her Majesty and those members of the royal family who are currently undertaking official public duties on behalf of the Queen". The flypast consisted of more than 70 aircraft of the Royal Air Force, Fleet Air Arm and Army Air Corps, including the Battle of Britain Memorial Flight, the Red Arrows and fifteen Typhoon fighters forming the number "70".

A flotilla of 70 vessels, comprising sloops, trawlers, tugs, patrol boats and more, sailed from Hull Marina to the Humber Bridge. The event re-enacted the Humber flotilla of 60 boats in 2012 for the Queen's diamond jubilee, and the occasion in 1897 when watermen gathered their boats on the Humber in celebration of Queen Victoria's 60 years on the throne. In Herefordshire, a giant lion puppet was paraded during Leominster Festival.

The tradition of lighting beacons was repeated across the Commonwealth. At Windsor Castle, the Queen lit the principal beacon by touching a glittering globe. At Buckingham Palace, the Duke of Cambridge represented the Queen as the "Tree of Trees" was lit. More than 3,500 beacons were lit around the world.

===== 3 June =====
On 3 June, a service of thanksgiving for the Queen's reign was held at St Paul's Cathedral. The Archbishop of York Stephen Cottrell praised the Queen for being "still in the saddle" and thanked her "for staying the course". After the service, members of the royal family attended a reception at London's Guildhall, hosted by the Lord Mayor. The Queen did not attend these events, after having experienced "discomfort" at Trooping the Colour on 2 June.

Princess Anne visited Edinburgh Zoo, where she met Ukrainian orphans. She visited HMS Albion and inspected a guard of honour before boarding the ship, where she met members of the ship's company and representatives from charities across Scotland supported by the Queen and Anne as patrons.

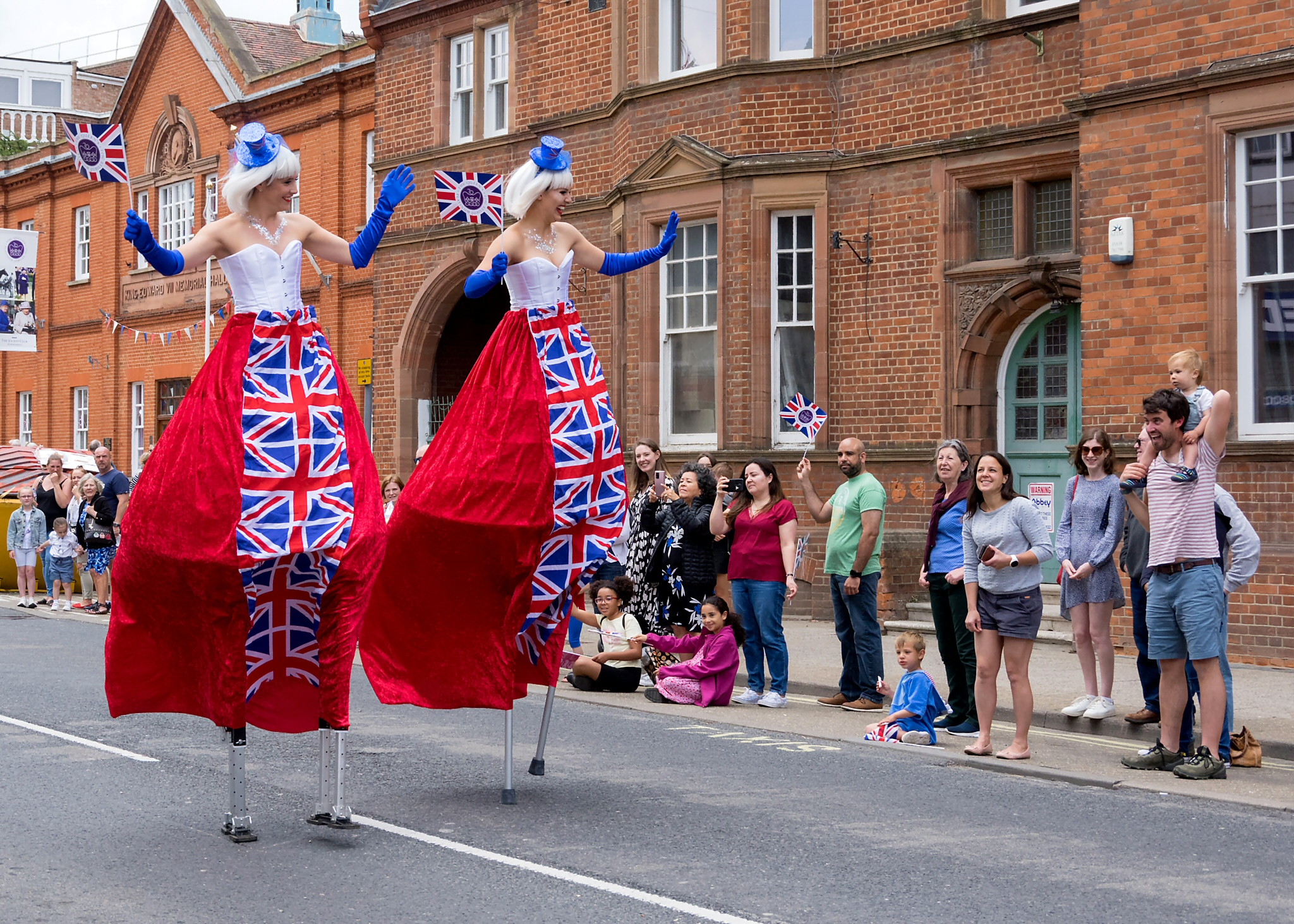
Platinum jubilee parade in Newmarket on 3 June

The Corby Pole Fair was held to coincide with the jubilee. In Newmarket, a parade was held. In central London, more than 100 corgis took part in a parade organised by the UK Corgi Club and Great Corgi Club of Britain.

===== 4 June =====
On 4 June, the Princess Royal attended the Derby at Epsom Downs. The Queen watched the Derby on television.

The Royal Forth Yacht Club organised a Parade of Sail with about 20 boats sailing between Newhaven and Granton Harbour in Edinburgh. At Kelso, Scottish Borders, the celebrations involved a parade and re-enactment of the coronation.

The Earl and Countess of Wessex and Forfar visited Northern Ireland. At Royal Avenue in Belfast, they attended a 1950s-themed celebration. The couple met groups of performers, and learnt about the city's diverse communities, which were explored through fashion, photography, music and dance. The Earl also met older members of the local community, brought together by Age-friendly Belfast, while the Countess joined in with craft activities, making crowns and toy corgis with school children. In Bangor, the Countess danced in the new Platinum Ballroom while the Earl pulled a pint in a 1950s-themed bar.

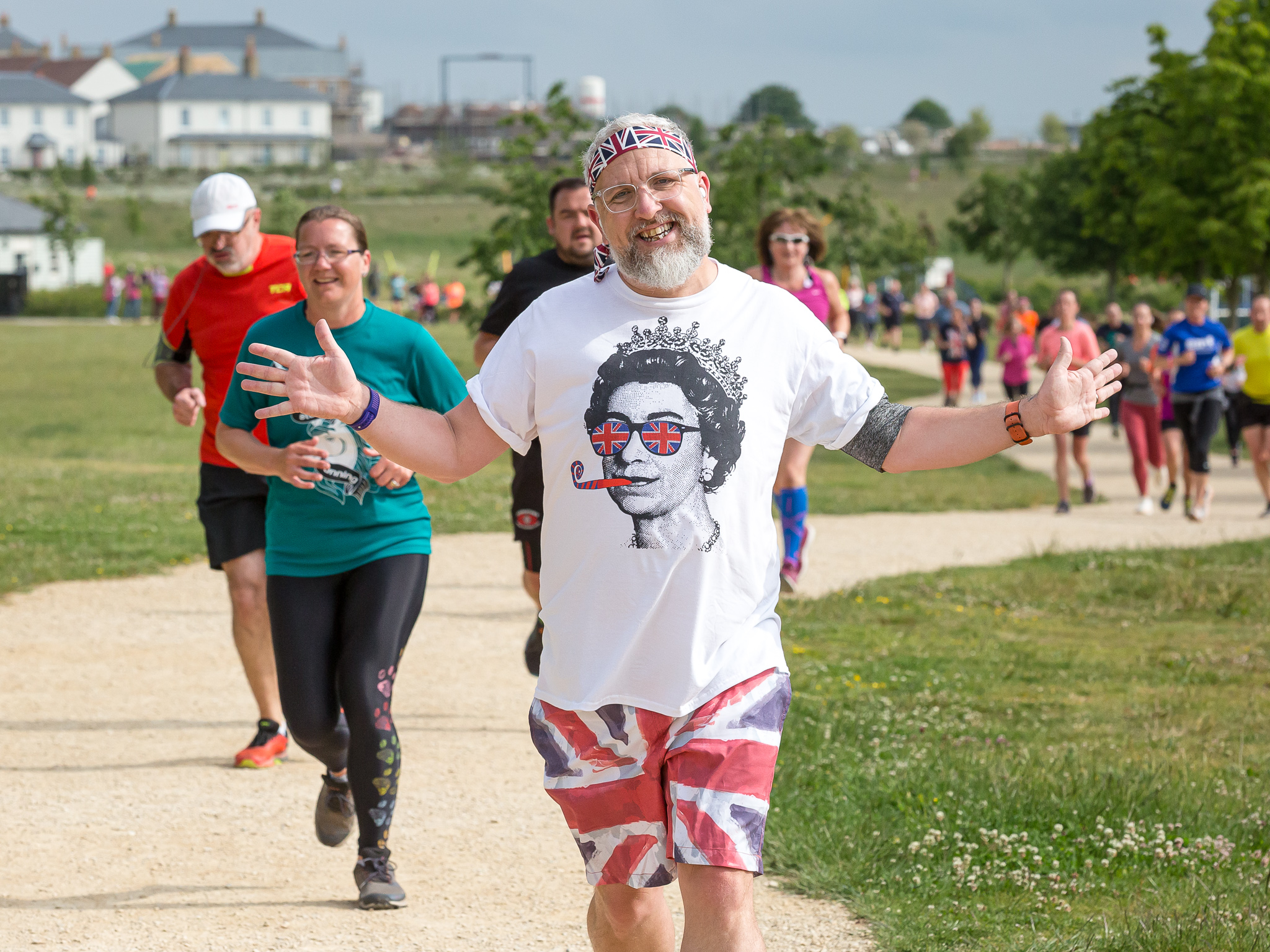
The Great Field platinum jubilee parkrun, Poundbury, Dorchester

In the evening, a concert, 'Platinum Party at the Palace', took place at Buckingham Palace. The BBC produced and broadcast it, and distributed it via the European Broadcasting Union's Eurovision network, like the Diamond Jubilee Concert. The public were invited to apply to attend the event. The event opened with a short two-minute film, produced by Buckingham Palace, BBC Studios, and Heyday Films/StudioCanal UK. The short film featured the Queen having tea with Paddington Bear, based on the 2014 film, and voiced by Ben Whishaw. It is one of the few times that the Queen has appeared in an acting role.

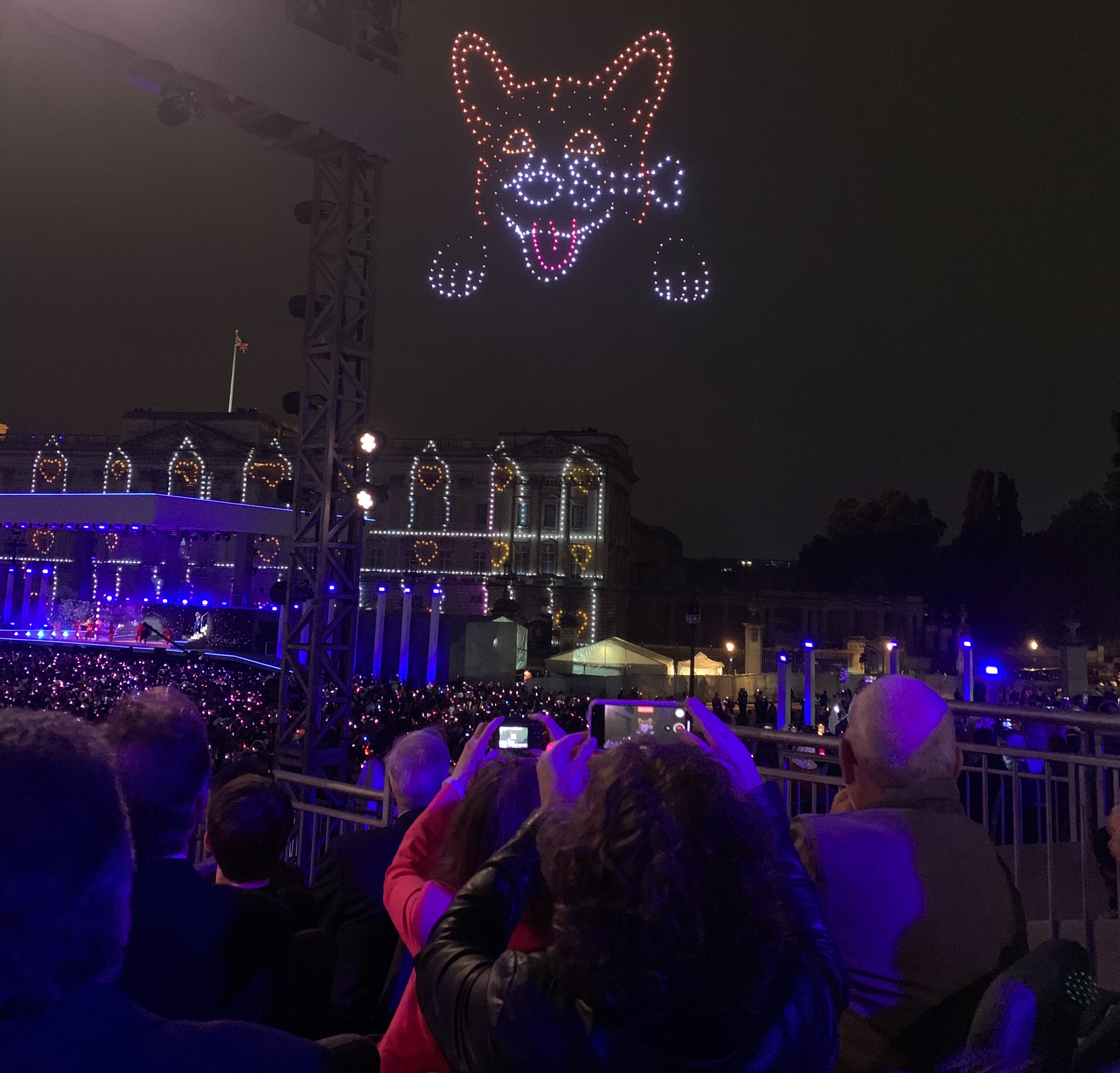
Drones forming a corgi above Buckingham Palace during the jubilee concert

Cardiff Castle hosted a concert featuring Welsh performers including Aled Jones, Bonnie Tyler, the Pendyrus Male Voice Choir, and "drumming weatherman" Owain Wyn Evans. The concert concluded with a specially produced "Singing in the Reign" programme celebrating Welsh hits from the past 70 years. The Duke and Duchess of Cambridge, along with Prince George and Princess Charlotte of Cambridge, attended concert rehearsals earlier in the day.

A vegan festival took place at Bath Pavilion.

===== 5 June =====
People were encouraged to have a Big Jubilee Lunch on 5 June, the last day of the extended bank holiday, to enable communities to celebrate their connections and get to know each other better. More than 85,000 people signed up to host Big Lunches and 16,000 street parties were held across the United Kingdom. A platinum jubilee picnic in Windsor was expected to become the longest ever held, breaking a record set in Memphis, Tennessee, in 2019. The organiser said the party would involve a 500-metre-long (550 yd) table – 100 yards (91 m) longer than the previous record, set at the Memphis in May International Festival. The UK's longest ever street party was held in Morecambe, where 500 tables were set up over the length of 1.6 miles (2.6 km). The Prince of Wales and the Duchess of Cornwall attended a lunch at The Oval cricket ground in south London, where a 12-metre-long (39 ft) cake prepared by the National Bakery School was served. The Duke and Duchess of Cambridge joined a lunch in Ladbroke Grove, and earlier the Duchess and her three children had baked cakes for a street party in Cardiff. The Earl and Countess of Wessex and Forfar joined a lunch near Windsor Castle. Princess Beatrice and Princess Eugenie attended a lunch organised by Westminster City Council for local volunteer and community groups who responded to the crisis caused by the COVID-19 pandemic.

A pageant featuring approximately 5,000 people from across the UK and the Commonwealth took place, with circus, carniva, costumed performers and 11 James Bond vehicles parading along The Mall through an array of over 200 silk flags, decorated with images drawn by children, as a 'River of Hope'. Actors, singers, presenters and sports stars rode on open-top buses. The Queen and her heirs appeared on the balcony of the Buckingham Palace for the finale of the pageant, and she later thanked everyone for their "good wishes" in a statement. The 2022 Thank You Day was also held, so people could thank the Queen, and their communities. 4.7 million people took part in organising jubilee events, while about 8.7 million attended a Thank You Day event and 3.3 million helped to organise one.

A platinum jubilee Corgi Derby took place at Musselburgh Racecourse in Scotland with a number of the Queen's favourite dogs take part in a novelty race in front of the crowd.

==== Displays and exhibitions ====
There were special displays and exhibitions at the official royal residences, including Buckingham Palace, Windsor Castle, and the Palace of Holyroodhouse. The Queen's portraits, jewellery and tiaras, and carriages were on display at Buckingham Palace from 22 July to 8 September. At Windsor Castle, the Queen's coronation robe was shown to visitors from 7 July to 8 September. The Palace of Holyroodhouse displayed the outfits worn by the Queen for her silver, golden, and diamond jubilees from 3 July to 8 September.

Balmoral Castle hosted the exhibition Life at Balmoral, which opened on 1 April and ran until 2 August. Set in the ballroom of Balmoral Castle, the exhibition had a collection of the Queen's clothing, including kilts, coats, hats and dresses.

At St Paul's Cathedral, there was a special exhibition from 25 May 2022 to 7 January 2023, titled Jubilee: St. Paul's, The Monarch and the Changing World, which explored the jubilees of four British monarchs: George III, Victoria, George V and Elizabeth II.

Between 28 May and 15 June, Sotheby's hosted the exhibition Power & Image: Royal & Aristocratic Tiaras that featured royal portraits, rare manuscripts, and tiaras, including Queen Victoria's emerald and diamond tiara, which was given to her by Prince Albert, and the Spencer tiara, a family heirloom which was frequently worn by Diana, Princess of Wales.

An exhibition was held at the Royal Mint Experience during the Bank Holiday weekend, which explored the Queen's reign through coins.

At the Imperial War Museum, London, the Queen's relationship with the Armed Forces was celebrated in an exhibition of photographs.

The Royal Borough of Windsor and Maidenhead encouraged people to send photos of street parties or memorabilia of the Queen's past jubilees as part of an exhibition, titled 70 Years 70 Photos. They were displayed in libraries, ahead of the jubilee weekend.

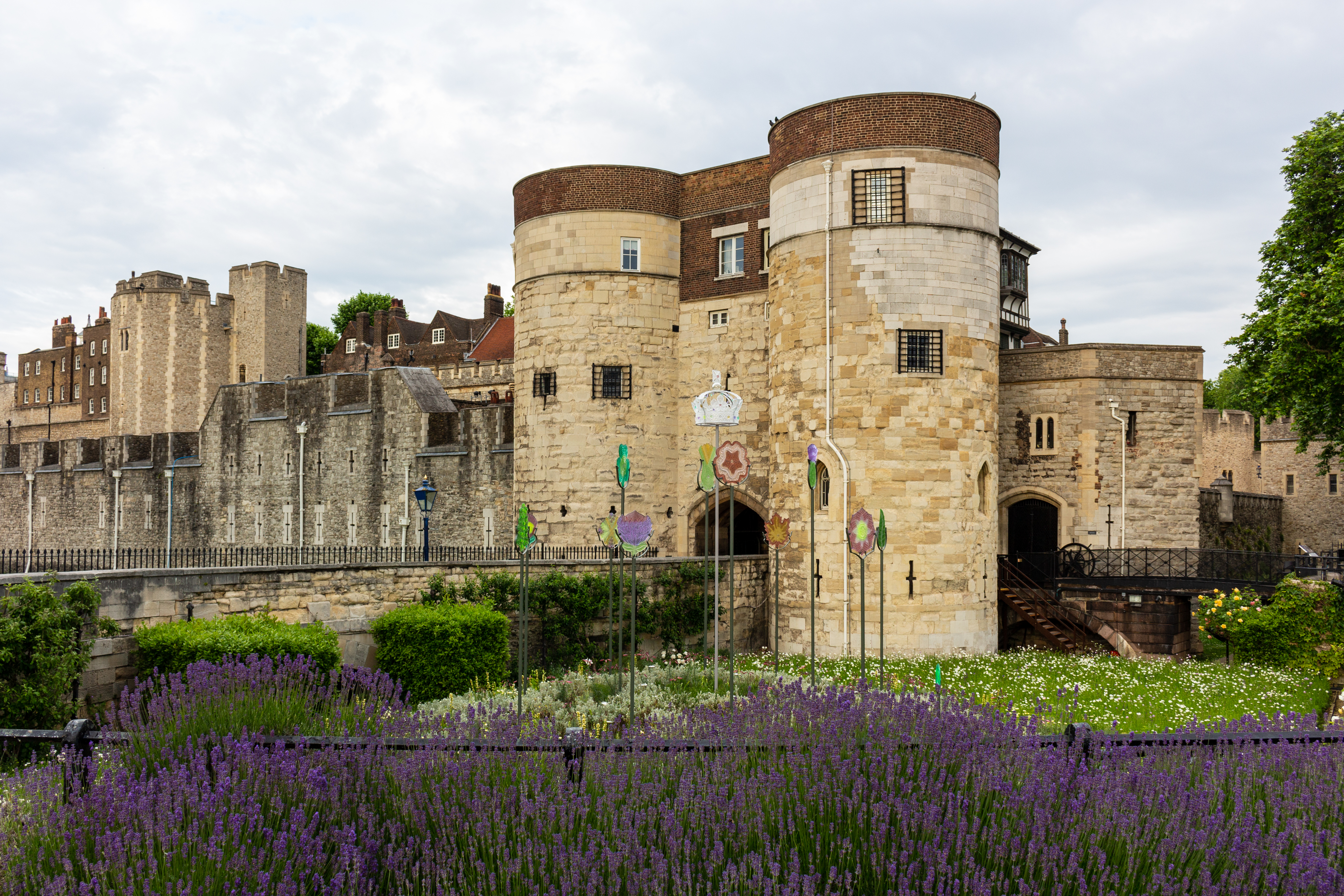
A garden was created in the moat to celebrate the jubilee on 30 May 2022.

Historic Royal Palaces planned for a Commonwealth-themed garden in the historic moat of the Tower of London. The display, titled Superbloom, was held from 1 June to 18 September. More than 20 million seeds were sown in spring 2022. The Commonwealth of Nations Globe, a platinum, diamond, gold and silver blue globe set within a silver crown on a blue and gold cushion, was unveiled at the Tower of London. The piece was sent to the site accompanied by a 70-piece military band and was featured during the beacon-lighting ceremony in June.

Titled Art Save The Queen, portraits of the Queen by artists ranging from graffitist musician Goldie to ballpoint specialist James Mylne were exhibited at GALLERY@OXO on London's South Bank, from 2 to 12 June.

Westminster Abbey roof were opened to public for the first time. Tours ran from June to August.

Madame Tussauds, London, displayed seven replica ensembles of Queen's outfits, which have been worn by some of the 24 lifelike wax figures of the Queen made by Tussauds during her reign, for the platinum jubilee. Waxwork figures of main royal family members also received a black tie makeover for the Jubilee.

A portrait of the Queen by the humanoid robot Ai-Da, titled Algorithm Queen, was displayed in London on 27 May.

From 1 to 29 June, fifty life-sized corgi sculptures were displayed in the windows and foyers of shops and businesses in Altrincham. Called Trooping the Corgis, the project featured mannequins hand-decorated by artists and children.

To mark the jubilee, the Royal Academy of Arts presented the Queen with the Platinum Jubilee Gift, a collection of works of art on paper by 20 recently elected academicians. They were displayed at the Queen's Gallery, Buckingham Palace, between 12 January and 26 February 2023.

==== Other tributes and events ====
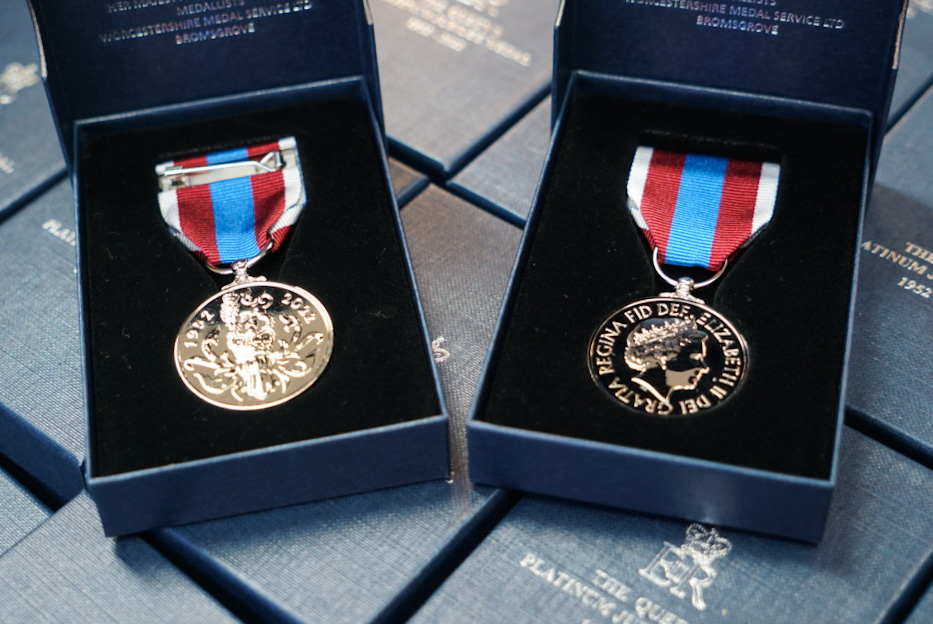
Platinum Jubilee medals

A platinum jubilee medal was awarded to people who work in public service, including members of the Armed Forces, emergency services, and the prison services.

As part of the Platinum Jubilee Civic Honours, the Queen gave several settlements city status. 39 places applied in the competition. In May, it was announced that the eight places that would be awarded city status were: Bangor in Northern Ireland; Colchester, Doncaster and Milton Keynes in England; Dunfermline in Scotland; Wrexham in Wales; Douglas in the Isle of Man; and Stanley in the Falkland Islands. The city of Southampton won the lord mayor title. Six historic sites visited by Queen were given listed status: All Saints' Church in Shard End, Birmingham; The Queen's Theatre in Hornchurch, London; Art Deco Sun Pavilion and Colonnade in Harrogate, North Yorkshire; Hampshire Archives in Winchester; Imperial Hotel in Stroud, Gloucestershire; and commemorative motorway markers on the M62, running through Yorkshire and Lancashire.

The Royal Collection Trust published a collection of 77 photographs under the title The Queen: 70 Glorious Years as an official souvenir publication. It also produced bottles of wine, labelled English Sparkling Wine: Platinum Jubilee Release and made using Chardonnay, Pinot noir, and Pinot Meunier grapes grown in Kent and West Sussex. In April, Heinz announced the production of limited-edition bottles of two of its favourite condiments, HP Sauce and Salad Cream, which were rebranded HM Sauce and Heinz Salad Queen respectively. Jubilee-themed food items were also released by other brands, including the Coronation Chicken Tower Burger by KFC, Clarence The Corgi Cake by Morrisons, the Crown Crust Pizza by Pizza Hut, Union Jack Mochi Donuts by Japan Centre, Coronation Tikka Sub by Subway, and three limited edition pizzas by Franco Manca.

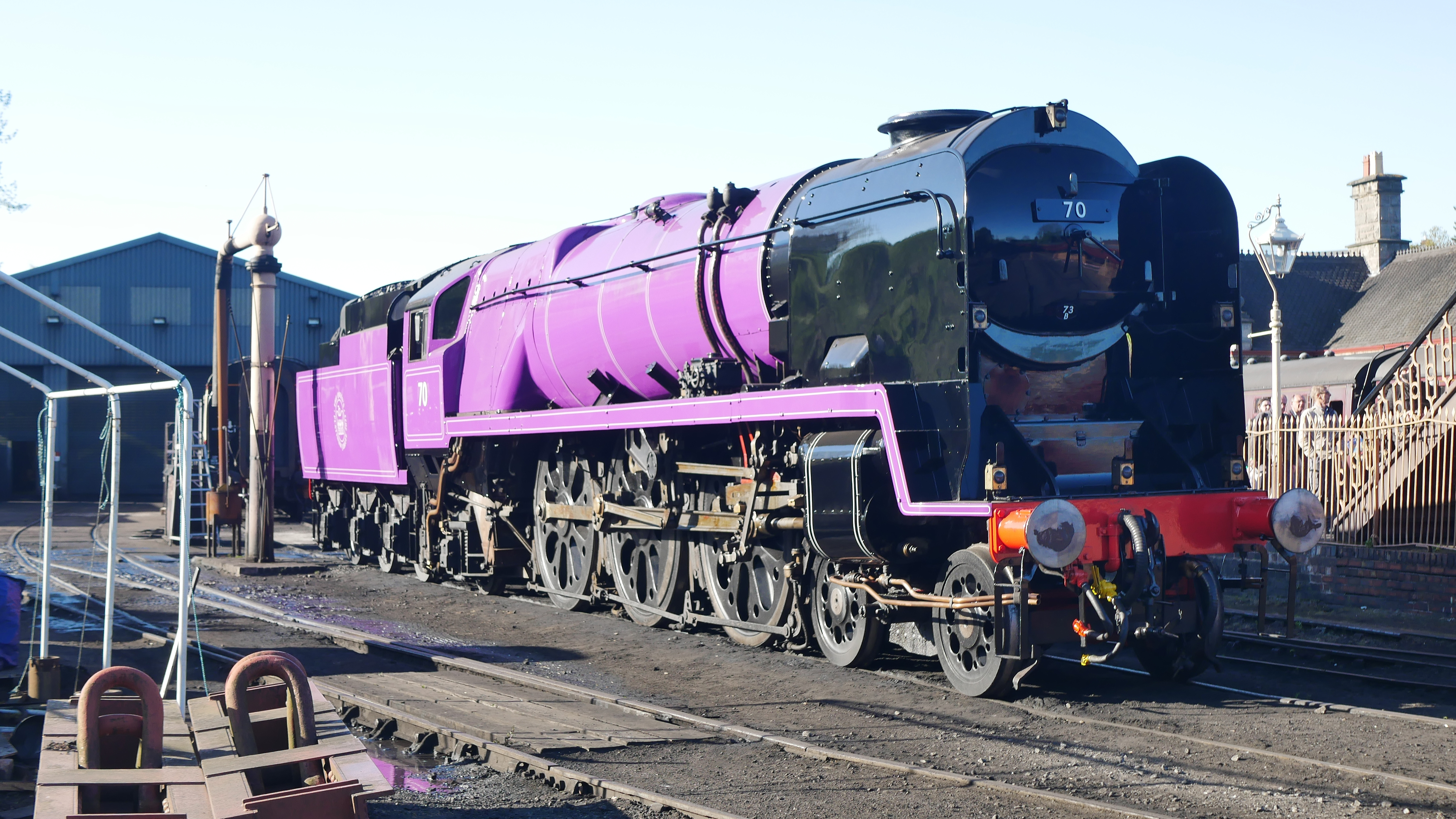
34027 Taw Valley painted purple

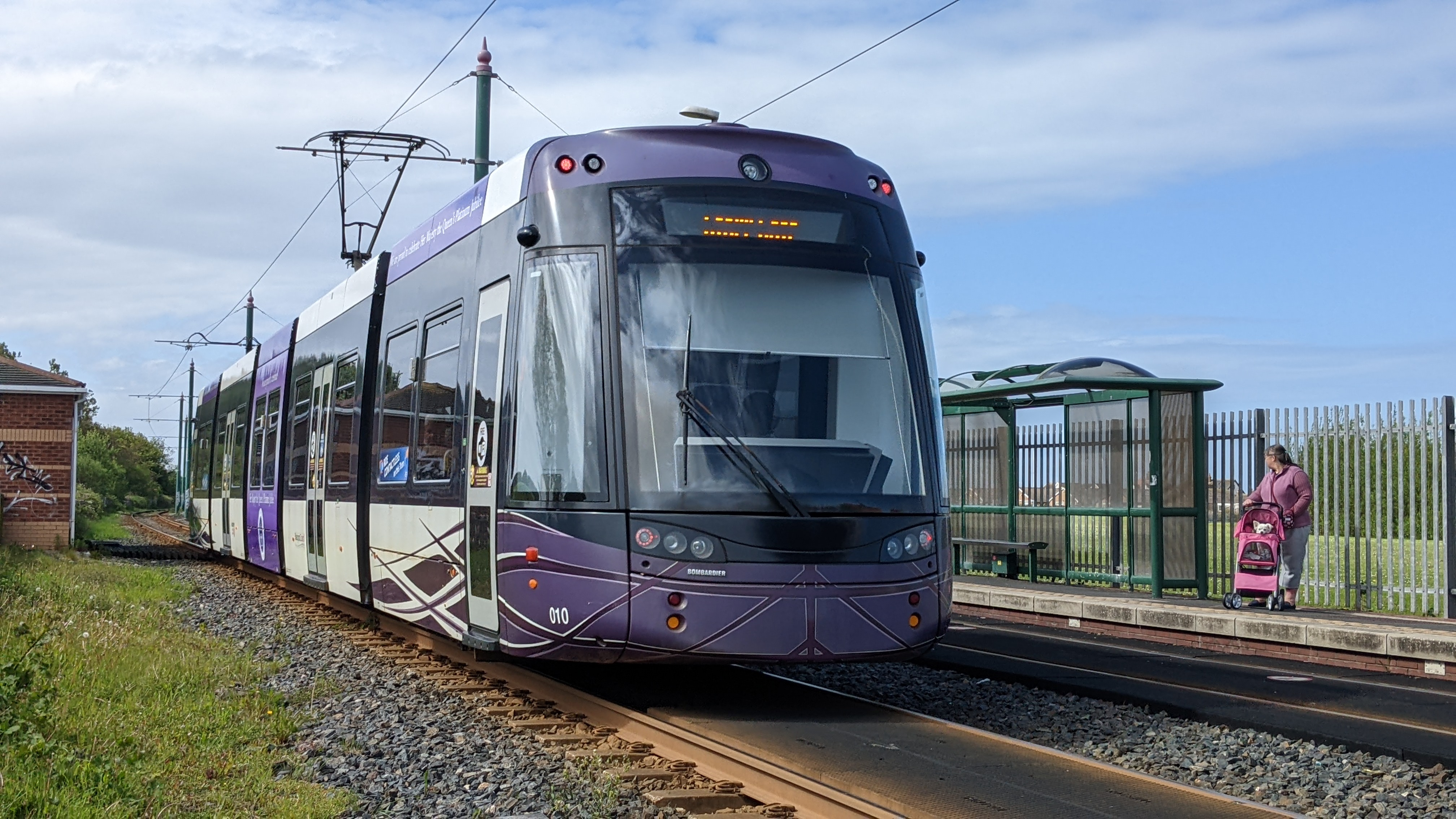
Blackpool Tramway tram in Platinum Jubilee livery

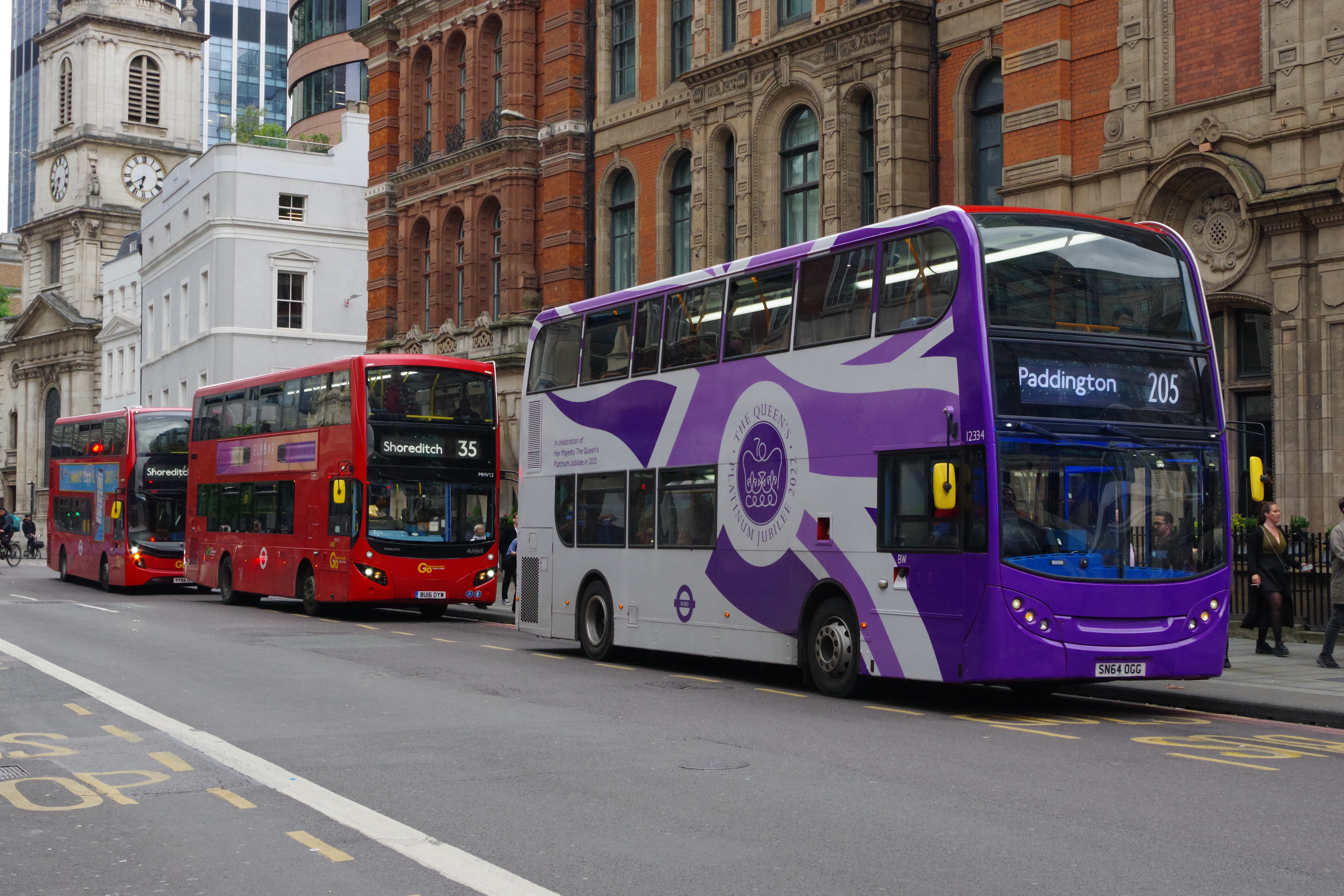
One of eight TfL Platinum Jubilee buses

Eight London buses on royal routes, passing Kensington Palace and Westminster Abbey, have been given commemorative purple wraps. Celebratory messages were played on the Jubilee line, the new Elizabeth line and at stations that have a royal link in their name, like Queen's Road. Reading Buses also unveiled a special Jubilee bus, to be used in Reading, Windsor and London throughout the year. The Severn Valley Railway repainted the steam engine 34027 Taw Valley in purple, and temporarily renamed it "Elizabeth II". The new name was chosen by public vote. The engine returned to its traditional green after a few months.

Primary school children in England and Northern Ireland received a free book, titled Queen Elizabeth: A Platinum Jubilee Celebration (with schools in the devolved countries of Wales and Scotland having to 'opt-in' to the programme). DK Books UK was commissioned by the British Government to publish the book, which was designed to celebrate the people, places, achievements of the United Kingdom and Commonwealth over the last 70 years. The book also explores the role of the Queen and what the Platinum Jubilee represents.

In Northern Ireland, a design competition was held for primary school children to create a "snapshot of Northern Ireland". The winning entry, designed by Emily McMullan from Dundonald Primary School, was manufactured into a rug by Northern Ireland company Ulster Carpets, and later sent to the Queen. In addition, the Queen and other members of the Royal Family received Northern Ireland Platinum Jubilee Hampers, showcasing more than fifty products from food and drink producers across Northern Ireland.

Starting on 18 January, GB News, a TV news broadcaster, announced that it would be playing the national anthem at 5:59 every morning before programmes commenced.

In March, the Duchess of Cornwall, also president of the Royal Voluntary Service, launched the organisation's Platinum Champions Awards to honour 70 volunteers nominated by the public for their efforts in improving lives in their communities. The Prince of Wales and the Duchess penned the foreword to The Platinum Jubilee Cookbook, which was released in April. They also appeared in a special episode of the British soap opera EastEnders. The Prince's Foundation organised tea dances for people suffering from loneliness and isolation.

In its April issue, British Vogue featured the Queen on its cover for the first time. Harper's Bazaar held a fashion shoot around the Tower of London, featuring designs by Victoria Beckham, Richard Quinn and Sarah Burton that were inspired by the Queen. Hello! commissioned a portrait by Ben Mosley. A portrait of the Queen was unveiled by Rob Munday. Titled Platinum Queen: Felicity, it was taken by Munday in 2004 during a session to create the first officially commissioned 3D hologram of the Queen. Tatler commissioned a new portrait of the Queen by Nigerian artist Oluwole Omofemi, for a special edition of Tatler magazine. Omofemi painted the Queen with black hair, which according to him represents the "power of the woman". He said, "when I look at her, I see someone who has conquered life".

Women's Institute members knitted toy corgis and hid them across the United Kingdom. One contained a pair of free tickets to the Big Jubilee Lunch in London during the Jubilee weekend. The Elephant Family commissioned seven giant egg-shaped artefacts, each representing a decade of the Queen's reign. They were displayed across the Cadogan Estate in Chelsea as a part of the Eggs of an Era exhibition from 16 May to 12 June to raise awareness about poaching and collectability of wild birds' eggs.

In March, a baby rhinoceros, born at Cotswold Wildlife Park in Burford, Oxfordshire, was christened "Queenie". In May, five Humboldt penguin chicks at London Zoo were named after famous people and events from the past 70 years. The names included Hillary, Apollo, Bobby, Bernie and Mac, after mountaineer Sir Edmund Hillary, the Apollo 11 Moon landing, footballer Bobby Moore, computer scientist Sir Tim Berners-Lee, and sailor Dame Ellen MacArthur.

The BBC and The Reading Agency announced in April the Big Jubilee Read, a list of 70 books by Commonwealth authors, ten from each decade of the Queen's reign. Michael Morpurgo released a new book There Once Is A Queen. For the Jubilee, Poet Laureate Simon Armitage wrote "Queenhood". It was published in The Times on 3 June and as a signed limited-edition pamphlet sold through commercial outlets (ISBN 9780571379606).

The Choir of the Earth invited people from around the world to learn and record a new arrangement of "God Save the Queen", which was presented to the Queen.

Virgin Records announced plans to re-release the Sex Pistols' 1977 single "God Save the Queen".

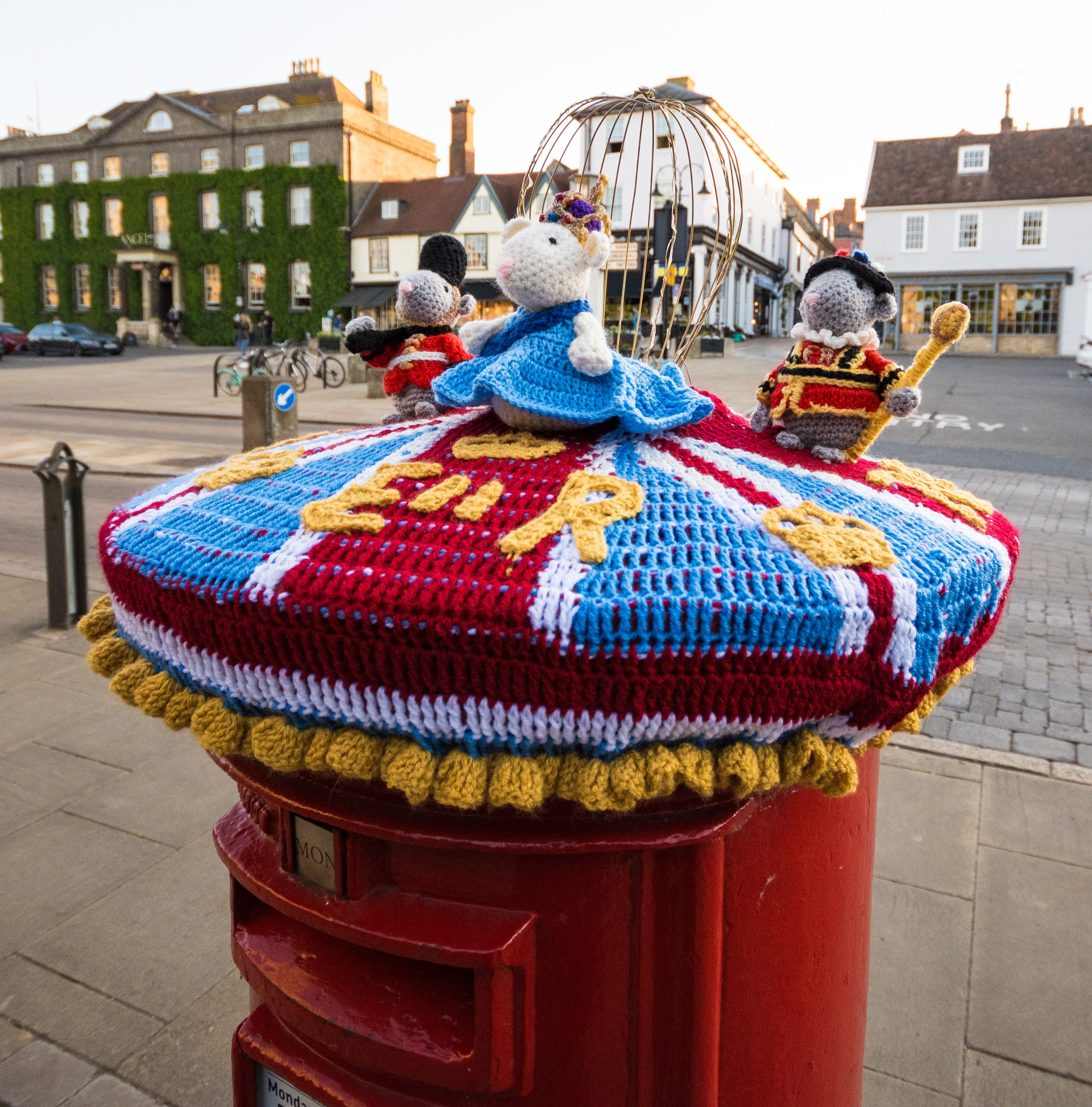
A Platinum Jubilee post box topper at Bury St. Edmunds, England

Across England, Jubilee-themed woolly postbox toppers appeared in towns and villages. St Mary's Church, Stogumber in Somerset was covered in more than 2,000 textile flowers for the occasion. The flowers were knitted, crocheted and sewn by volunteers.

In May, at Ely Cathedral in Cambridgeshire, the Princess Royal officially unveiled a table made from a 5,000-year-old oak tree. The 13-metre (43 ft) table was created from a black oak, that was found buried and preserved in a farmland at Methwold Hythe, near Downham Market, in 2012. Specialists spent 10 years crafting the piece.

In Weymouth, David Hicks carved a tribute in sand at a visitor attraction. It depicted the Queen on a commemorative 50p coin, and took 10 days to complete. In Barnsley town centre, a 20-tonne royal-themed sand sculpture was created.

In May, the London Eye opened a Platinum Jubilee time capsule pod that ran until 4 September. Decorated with memorabilia, 1950s furnishings, as well as photographs of the Queen at every stage of her 70-year reign, it also served the Queen's favourite drinks. Portraits of the Queen from throughout her reign were projected onto Stonehenge and Marble Arch. The Jubilee was also marked at the Legoland Windsor Resort, where a pageant down The Mall in miniature and a picnic scene at Windsor Castle were created.

The Herefordshire village of Wellington created 104 royal-themed scarecrows. The Worshipful Company of Goldsmiths and the Royal Liverpool Philharmonic each commissioned brooches to be gifted to the Queen to mark the occasion.

The Platinum Jubilee Village Hall Improvement Grant Fund was launched in May by the UK government, to provide grant funding over three years to support capital improvement projects for village halls, such as installing Wi-Fi, extending buildings and modernising facilities.

South Gloucestershire Council has suggested that the Severn Bridge be renamed in honour of the platinum jubilee. A newly constructed railway bridge near Stonehouse, Gloucestershire, was named Ocean Jubilee Bridge.

A life-size bronze sculpture depicting the Queen in the uniform of the Grenadier Guards on her horse Burmese was unveiled at the Royal Military Academy Sandhurst by the Earl of Wessex and Forfar on 27 May. A statue of the Queen was posthumously unveiled by King Charles III at York Minster on 9 November. The 2-metre (6.6 ft) statue weighs approximately two tonnes. Another statue commissioned by the Test Valley Borough Council was unveiled at Romsey Abbey by the Countess Mountbatten of Burma on 4 September 2026.

In June, Cabinet ministers gave the Queen a music box that plays Handel's Hallelujah. The small, hand-painted box, finished with a platinum mount, features an illustration of No. 10 on the lid and miniature portraits of all fourteen of her prime ministers around the sides from Winston Churchill to Boris Johnson. The portraits are surrounded by the same shade of yellow found on the walls of the staircase at No. 10, which feature pictures of all the British prime ministers.

In August, the Princess Royal attended the Solent Platinum Jubilee event, a showcase by the Solent's sailing and yachting community which featured over 400 boats.

At the Princess Royal & Duke of Fife Memorial Park, in Braemar, a new archway was built to commemorate the Queen's Platinum Jubilee. On 3 September, the Duke and Duchess of Rothesay unveiled the structure to celebrate the Braemar Royal Highland Gathering.

The Queen also gave her blessing to female members of the royal family to take part in Good Housekeeping's Christmas 2022 and New Year 2023 issue to mark her Platinum Jubilee and the 100th anniversary of the magazine's publication in the UK.

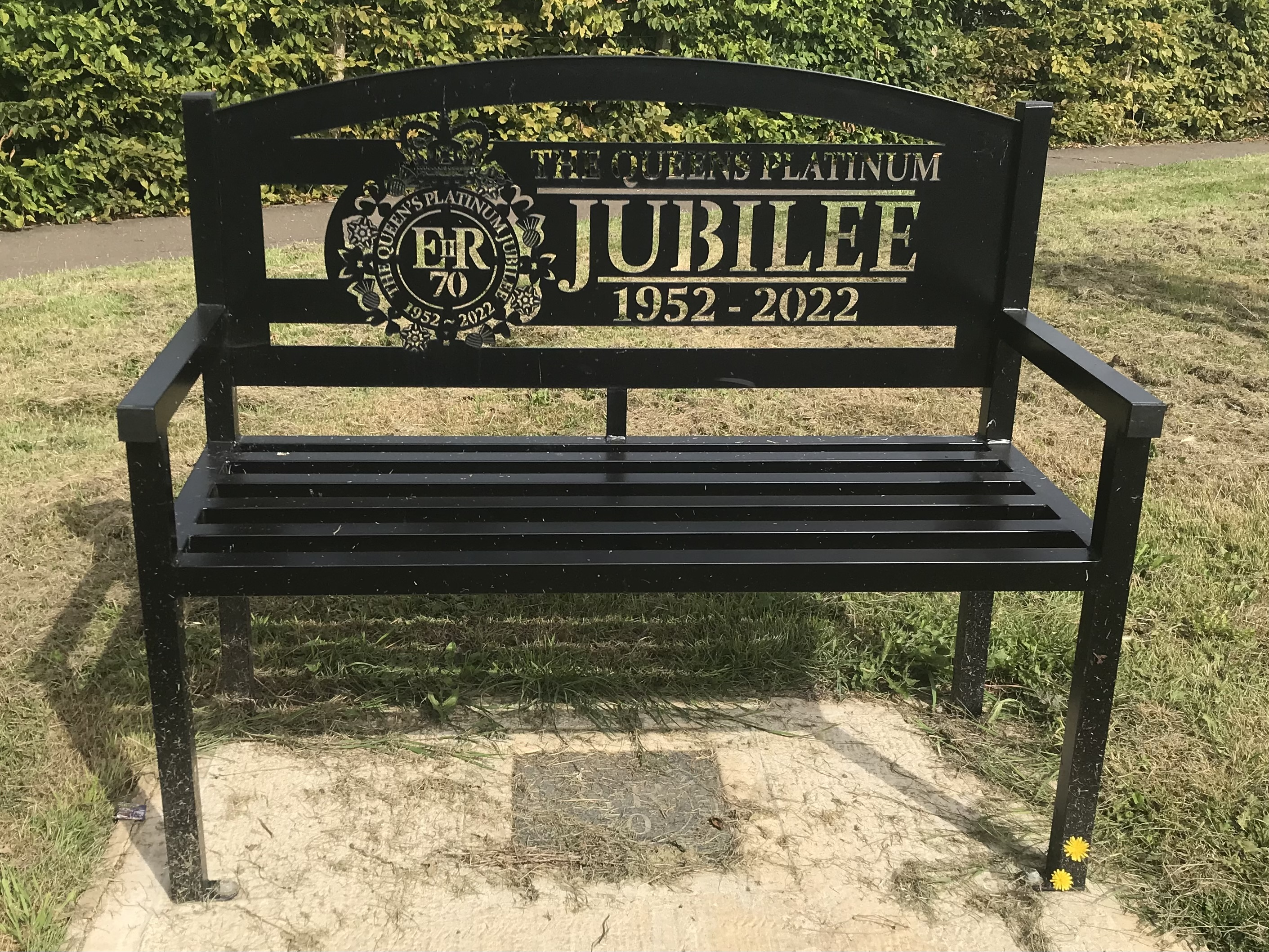
Bench commemorating the Platinum Jubilee in Mattishall, Norfolk.

In December 2022, King Charles III unveiled the Platinum Jubilee gift, a pair of bronze sculpted lamps located between the Diamond Jubilee window in Westminster Hall and the Silver Jubilee fountain in New Palace Yard. The four nations of the United Kingdom are represented in the work in the form of heraldic beasts, including the Lion of England, the Unicorn of Scotland, the Dragon of Wales and the Irish Elk of Northern Ireland. The lanterns themselves resemble St Edward's Crown.

=== Crown Dependencies ===
==== Guernsey ====
A set of stamps was released by Guernsey Post on 4 February 2022. In each stamp, the Queen is wearing Queen Victoria's golden jubilee necklace, which is said to be one of her favourite pieces of jewellery. Coins commemorating the Jubilee were also released.

At Sausmarez Manor, on 22 February, more than 70 Girlguides and their families planted 70 trees.

There was a four-day bank holiday in Guernsey from 2 to 5 June.

Celebrations in Guernsey commenced at Castle Cornet on 2 June, with the grounds being open all day for people to enjoy for free. At noon, a 21-gun salute was fired by the castle's cannons. The Guernsey Yacht Club organised a Sail Past at Castle Cornet. In the evening, the lighting of a beacon at Castle Cornet took place.

On 4 June, a community fete was held in the grounds of Government House, with family entertainment, children's activities, and music, including performances from Belles and Broomstick, Kirsty and George, The Wright Singers and GATE. In the evening, the Guernsey Concert Band performed music from Baroque to Big Band, including performance by singer Poppy Neame, the granddaughter of Lieutenant General Sir Philip Neame who served as Lieutenant Governor of Guernsey from 1945 to 1952.

On 5 June, Guernsey Arts held a Platinum Jubilee Celebration Seafront Sunday in Saint Peter Port.

Each parish was invited to plant a display, to win a Platinum Jubilee Floral Guernsey Discretionary Award. Schools planted "a tree for every class" and a commemorative 50p coin was presented to every full-time student.

Events also took place in Alderney during the weekend. On 2 June, the day started with a party on the Butes and end with the lighting of a beacon. A Gala Dinner took place on the evening of 3 June at the Braye Beach Hotel. On 4 June, a Saturday fete was held at Frette Farm by The Blonde Hedgehog. On 5 June, there was a Churches Together Service at St Anne's Church, followed by a parade. All of the island's restaurants served Jubilee-themed Sunday lunches. A competition to find the best decorated houses and gardens took place and sports clubs competed for Jubilee Trophies.

===== Guernsey platinum jubilee flag =====
The Guernsey Platinum Jubilee Flag

The Committee for Education, Sport & Culture launched a competition for islanders to design a jubilee flag. More than 400 entries were sent. The winning design, by Ben Le Marchant, is based on a 1953 Coronation postage stamp with a wave pattern based on the sea as a connection to Guernsey. The colours red and yellow are taken from the Guernsey flag, and the purple and white represent the colours of the Platinum Jubilee emblem. The Weighbridge Mast flew the flag over the summer. A replica of the winning flag was sent to the Queen along with Guernsey's official Jubilee message.

Six designs were also chosen as runners-up and featured on a set of Guernsey platinum jubilee postcards.

==== Jersey ====
Commemorative coins were issued in Jersey, with a stamp issued on 1 June. The stamp features a photograph taken by Dorothy Wilding in 1952, it is printed with several "special ink effects", including using an iridescent ink which gives the Queen's dress, crown and necklace a "subtle sparkle".

On Accession Day, the bailiff of Jersey sent a congratulatory message to the Queen. Church across Jersey marked the occasion by ringing bells at noon for 15 minutes.

On 1 June, a 21-gun salute was fired by the Jersey Militia, and a reception held at Government House. On 2 June, the Queen's Platinum Jubilee Beacons were lit at Glacis Field, in front of a crowd of 5,000 people. On 3 June, the Jersey International Motoring Festival Pageant included a formal march by representatives from all uniformed organisations in Jersey. On 5 June, a service was held at the Town Church, led by Mike Keirle, Dean of Jersey. High tea on the high street and a race at Les Landes race course also took place.

Islanders were invited to enjoy a picnic at Elizabeth Castle.

==== Isle of Man ====
The Isle of Man Post Office released a new stamp collection on 6 February to mark the jubilee. Each of the eight commemorative stamps feature a picture of the Queen, who holds the title Lord of Mann, along with words from "God Save the Queen".

At an event organised by the Douglas Borough Council, 70 trees were planted by schoolchildren next to a new cycleway at Spring Valley alongside the edge of Douglas Golf Course. Trees species found on the grounds of Buckingham Palace were chosen, and include silver birch, flowered wild cherry, English oak, and small leaved lime trees.

The Isle of Man Government created a Platinum Jubilee Event Fund that provided up to £5,000 grant to help fund community-based projects and celebrations organised by the local authorities, non-profit making community/voluntary groups and local charities, in honour of the jubilee.

In April 2022, a set of five commemorative 50p coins was released. The set outlines the Queen's role as Lord of Mann, and depicts royal beasts alongside words from God Save the Queen. The Treasury also released a sovereign in gold and silver, marking the 70 years in Roman Numerals, and a crown coin.

Douglas, the capital of the Isle of Man, was granted city status. Chief Minister Alfred Cannan said it was "a huge honour for the island" that celebrates its "unique mix of culture, history and heritage".

The Manx government gave the Queen a brooch in the shape of the Isle of Man, made there by Element Isle. The 'Infinity Isle of Man' brooch design outlines the island with four gems (Blue Topaz, Citrine, Amethyst and Emerald) representing the towns of Ramsey, Peel, Castletown and the city of Douglas. The colours of the stones were selected to represent Manx tartan.

There was a four-day bank holiday from 2 to 5 June. On 2 June, beacons were lit at St Ninian's Church; Raglan Pier, Port Erin; Ballavell Farm, Ballasalla; Douglas Head, and Slieau Lhost. On 3 June, a street party took place at the Family Library, and a celebration by Arbory and Rushen Commissioners. A Service of Thanksgiving took place on 5 June, and Big Jubilee Lunches were held across the Island.

On 25 June, Onchan District Commissioners organised the "Party in the Park". The Douglas Jubilee Carnival was held by the Douglas Borough Council on 23 July.

=== British Overseas Territories ===
==== Bermuda ====
In November 2021, the governor of Bermuda hosted a ceremony at Government House, Bermuda, with 70 trees planted.

In May 2022, a giant photograph of the Queen was placed on the Seon Place Building in Hamilton.

On 2 June, the governor hosted the Queen's Birthday and platinum jubilee reception at Government House. On 3 June, the governor and the premier planted two trees to mark the Jubilee. On 4 June, the annual Queen's Birthday Parade took place along Front Street. The governor also presented representatives of the uniformed services with platinum jubilee medals. On 5 June, a service of thanksgiving was held at the Cathedral of the Most Holy Trinity, Hamilton, and on 12 June, St. Peter's Church, St. George's, hosted a Service to mark the platinum jubilee and the tenth anniversary of the Intituling of St Peter's Church as "Their Majesties Chappell".

==== British Antarctic Territory ====
A new 50p coin was released by the British Antarctic Territory to mark the jubilee. The coin features the Queen's royal cypher surrounded by a rose, representing England, a daffodil, representing Wales, a thistle, representing Scotland, and shamrocks, representing Northern Ireland. The design also incorporates the jubilee emblem.

Postage stamps commemorating the jubilee were released on 24 March.

==== British Virgin Islands ====
Beacon lighting and community events were held in the British Virgin Islands on 2 June.

==== Cayman Islands ====
Caymanian celebrations began with the opening of a commemorative exhibition by the Cayman Islands National Museum on 5 February.

On Accession Day, the governor and the premier of Cayman Islands released statements. On the same day, a special sitting was held at the House of Parliament. The governor read a special proclamation, and speeches were given by the speaker of the parliament, premier and the leader of the opposition. 70 seconds of silence were observed across the Cayman Islands at 12:15 pm to mark seventy years since the death of King George VI. During this time, radio stations remained silent and bells were rung in many churches.

A commemorative exhibit began on Commonwealth Day and continued through the end of June in the foyer of the House of Parliament. The exhibition features historical photographs of the Queen's visits to the Cayman Islands, as well as royal memorabilia and Postal Service royal stamp issues.

The Cayman Platinum Cake Competition was launched on 1 March. Nine finalists were invited to Government House on 28 April for a taste test by judges Lori-Ann Foley, Brittani Seymour, Elizabeth Larsen and Mark Lea. The winning recipe by Anne Frawley is called the "Cayman Sunrise Cake", which is adapted to include flavours and ingredients native to the Cayman Islands. The cake was served at the Queen's Birthday Party on 6 June.

A competition was launched by the Ministry of Youth, Sports, Culture & Heritage to find a song or a jingle that "exemplifies the celebration of 70 years of the Queen's reign". The competition is open to national songwriters, vocal recording artists and composers until 3 June. The winning three best entries were announced on 11 June at the DART Park Amphitheatre.

On 2 June, beacons were lit on the grounds of Pedro St. James, in Grand Cayman and at the Christopher Columbus Gardens in Cayman Brac. An outdoor concert showcased performances from the National Choir and the National Orchestra in Grand Cayman, while musical performances took place in the Brac. On 3 June, a live music concert took place in downtown George Town. Throughout the weekend, trees were planted across the Cayman Islands as part of The Queen's Green Canopy. On 5 June, a Service of Thanksgiving took place at Elmslie Memorial Church. On the same day, a children's tea party was held at the Queen Elizabeth II Botanical Park. On 6 June, Caymanians celebrated with the traditional parade and garden party at Government House. An evening fireworks display also took place along Seven Mile Beach.

An international air show was held in Grand Cayman.

==== Falkland Islands ====
Commemorative stamps were released by the Falkland Islands on 24 March.

Stanley, the capital of the Falkland Islands, was granted city status. The islands' government said it was "over the moon" and would be "partying with the penguins".

There were public holidays on 2 and 3 June. On 1 June, a reception was held at the Town Hall. On 2 June, frontline serving members of the Royal Falkland Islands Police, Falklands Fire & Rescue, Falkland Islands Defence Force, and other emergency services were awarded commemorative platinum jubilee medals at Government House. Beacon lighting took place at Moody Brook and Government House. On 3 June, a church service was held at Christ Church Cathedral. On 4 June, community events and celebrations took place at the Town Hall. On 5 June, a cake competition was held at the Town Hall.

==== Gibraltar ====
On Accession Day, the Governor and the Chief Minister of Gibraltar issued statements and paid tribute to the Queen. The Union Flag was flown from the Moorish Castle throughout the day. On 7 February, a gun salute was fired by the Royal Gibraltar Regiment from Grand Battery.

On 25 April, Gibraltar issued a set of commemorative stamps.

As in the UK, there was a double bank holiday on 2 and 3 June. On 2 June, a food festival Jubilita took place at the three of Gibraltar's City Squares – the Theatre Royal Square, John Mackintosh Square and Campion Park. Jubilita offered a historical trail through the Queen's reign, with dishes from different eras. On 4 June, a street party was held at Governor's Parade.

Gibraltar National Archives organised a jubilee exhibition at Gustavo Bacarisas Gallery from 7 June to 27 July.

==== Montserrat ====
In Montserrat, celebrations began in the middle of May with radio quizzes. Medal ceremonies took place between 13 and 30 May to honour uniformed personnel who had served 5 or more years within the Royal Montserrat Defence Force, Royal Police Service, Her Majesty's Prison and the Montserrat Fire and Rescue Services.

There were public holidays on 2 and 3 June. At Little Bay, a beacon lighting ceremony took place on 2 June, with an outdoor concert. On 3 June, a ceremonial parade took place at Salem Park, followed by the Queen's Birthday Party on 4 June. Tree planting ceremonies took place across Montserrat. Other activities include poetry and art competitions for children and social activities for various age categories.

==== Pitcairn Islands ====
In Pitcairn Islands, the smallest British overseas territory with no more than 50 permanent inhabitants, a jubilee dinner was held on 2 June. The territory was also the last to light a jubilee beacon.

==== Turks and Caicos Islands ====
Governor Nigel Dakin approved an extra holiday on 6 June, throughout the Turks and Caicos Islands. In addition, the Queen's Birthday public holiday was observed on June 3, rather than the usual 13 June, to create a four-day weekend celebration as a tribute to the Queen's reign.

Planned celebrations include events in Grand Turk, a tree planting ceremony, a beacon lighting ceremony and the Queen's Birthday Parade.

Platinum jubilee medals were awarded to public servants for their service over the years, as well as to the persons for 18, 25 and 30 years of service to the Crown.

=== Canada ===
The Platinum Jubilee of Her Majesty Queen Elizabeth II was the first time in Canada's history that a Canadian monarch celebrated 70 years on the throne.

==== Planning ====
A series of initiatives have been organised by the federal government. On 11 June 2021, Prime Minister Justin Trudeau had a virtual audience with the Queen, wherein they discussed preparations for Canadian celebrations. Provincial governments also started planning for the Jubilee in 2021, as did private organisations, like the Canadian branch of Rotary Club.

An emblem for the jubilee was created by Cathy Bursey-Sabourin, the Fraser Herald of Arms, and registered with the Canadian Heraldic Authority in December 2021. A platinum jubilee flag that features the emblem on a white background was also created and flown at government houses and events throughout the jubilee year. The federal government also created lapel pins using the jubilee emblem, and distributed them to all parliamentarians, so they could award them to Canadians who greatly contributed to their communities. Platinum Jubilee lapel pins were also distributed across the country by the Monarchist League of Canada.

The Department of Canadian Heritage created a program that provides up to CA$5,000 grant to help fund community-based projects and celebrations, as well as permitting larger initiatives to apply for the Commemorate Canada grant, as the jubilee was considered an anniversary of significance for the country. Through the Queen Elizabeth II's Platinum Jubilee Fund, Canadian Heritage invested CA$2.14 million to support celebrations in 360 local communities and three national projects. Approved projects include artistic performances and exhibitions, educational programs, garden and tea parties, geocaching programs, military parades, summer reading programs, and tree-planting events. Funded initiatives aim to educate Canadians about the role of the Canadian Crown and celebrate Canadian achievements over the past seven decades.

The Platinum Jubilee was the first publicly celebrated jubilee in which the Canadian government didn't issue a jubilee medal. Responding to queries about the medal, Canadian Heritage noted the decision to not issue a medal was "an approach consistent with that adopted by almost all Commonwealth realms". However, the decision was criticised by the Royal Canadian Legion and the Monarchist League of Canada, the latter also criticising the scale of the federal government's planning for the event. Several provincial governments instituted their own Jubilee medals, with Alberta and Saskatchewan issuing 7,000 medals each; Nova Scotia issuing 5,000 medals; Manitoba issuing 1,000 medals; New Brunswick issuing 3000 medals; and Prince Edward Island issuing 584 medals. The same legislative act that authorized Alberta's Platinum Jubilee medals also replaced awards created for the Queen's Golden Jubilee in 2002, with platinum jubilee equivalents and increased their monetary prizes. The government of Ontario stated it would celebrate the anniversary through the province's existing honours and medals, as well as issuing commemorative Platinum Jubilee lapel pins. The government of Manitoba provided grant funding with a focus on reconciliation to Manitoba's six Royally-designated organizations (Note: Royally-designated organisations in Manitoba (and the year they received the Royal prefix from the Queen) are: Royal Winnipeg Ballet (1953), Royal Manitoba Winter Fair (1970), Royal Manitoba Yacht Club (1981), Royal Military Institute of Manitoba (1982), Royal Manitoba Theatre Centre (2010), and Royal Aviation Museum of Western Canada (2014).) to facilitate jubilee initiatives throughout the year.

==== Accession Day events in Canada ====
Celebrations were launched by the Department of Canadian Heritage on 6 February, as the government encouraged Canadians across the country to celebrate the jubilee in "their own unique ways". On the same day, Governor General Mary Simon, lieutenant governors, Prime Minister Trudeau, all issued statements congratulating the Queen, as did the provincial premiers, and the Speaker of the Senate of Canada. The Governor General said:

Much has changed in the last seven decades. We extended the hand of friendship to nations around the world. We made advancements in medical research, most recently with vaccines. We established the Truth and Reconciliation Commission and took part in its work. We saw the first Canadian named governor general, then the first woman, and now, the first indigenous person.

Flag raising ceremonies for the Canadian royal standard and the platinum jubilee flag occurred at Rideau Hall and several provincial legislatures and government houses. Evensong services were also held in a variety of churches of the Diocese of British Columbia and the Anglican Diocese of Toronto, with the Lieutenant Governor of Ontario attending a service in Cathedral Church of St James in Toronto.

==== Tributes across the country ====
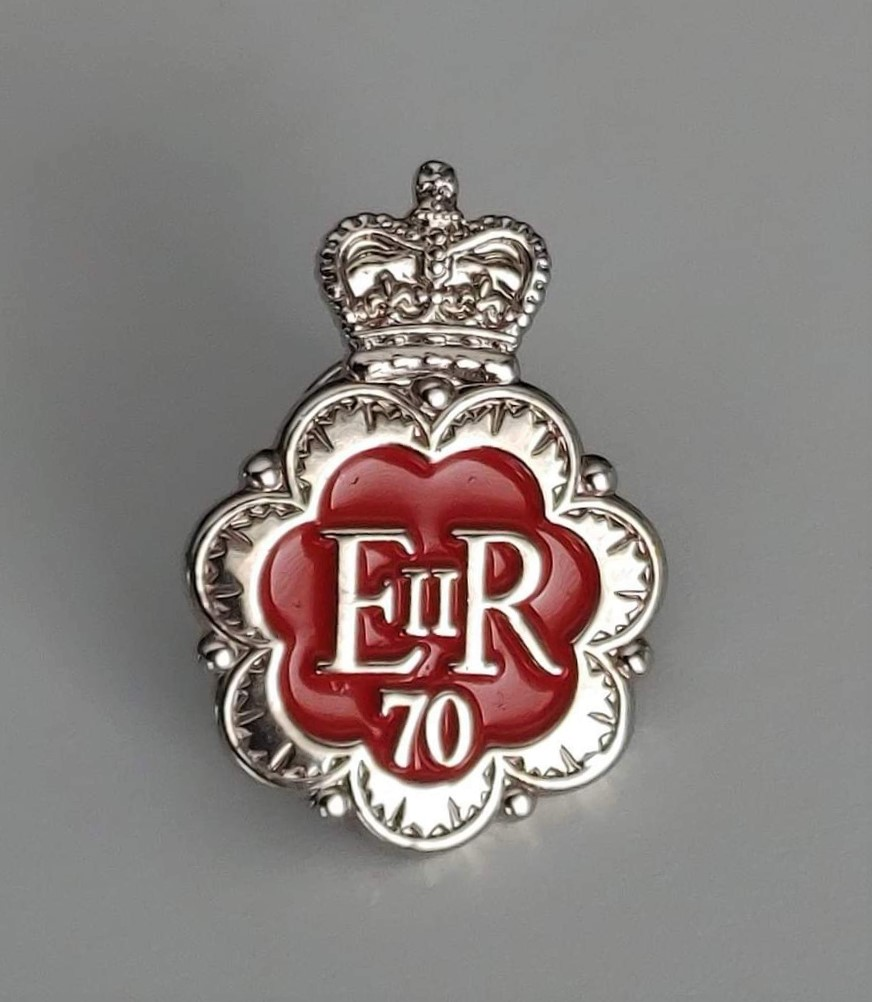
Canadian High Commissioner to the United Kingdom, Ralph Goodale, said that the Platinum Jubilee lapel pin (pictured) is a "very dignified, high-quality piece that is intended to reach a large number of Canadians, not just a few that might be on a medals list", as "the idea was to reach further".

The Royal Canadian Mint released a series of coins, including the two-coin jubilee set, a one-ounce platinum coin, a double-portrait proof silver dollar, and coins depicting the Queen's Diamond Diadem. Canada Post issued a commemorative stamp, which features a profile of the Queen by Arnold Machin.

In the realms of arts and letters, the Royal Canadian Geographical Society and Canadian Geographic magazine created a series of commemorative pieces for the jubilee, the first of which were released on 6 February. The magazine also launched its own platinum jubilee website, and through its education wing, launched "The Queen's Jubilee Classroom Challenge", which ran from 1 April to 31 May 2022 and encouraged students to "head out into their own communities to discover and learn about native plants", drawing inspiration from The Queen's Commonwealth Canopy and The Queen's Green Canopy. The Lieutenant Governor's BC Journalism Fellowship and the Lieutenant Governor's Art and Music Award were launched by the Queen's representative in British Columbia.

In May, it was announced that the year's Royal St. John's Regatta would be renamed Platinum Jubilee Royal St John's Regatta, and the event took place at Quidi Vidi Lake on 4 August. On 13 May, a battery of the 1st Regiment of the Royal Canadian Horse Artillery was also renamed The Queen's Battery. Special call-sign prefixes for the jubilee were approved by Innovation, Science, and Economic Development Canada for use by amateur radio operators from 15 May to 14 July. The Canadian Broadcasting Corporation produced a documentary, The Queen and Canada, airing on 4 June on CBC News Network.

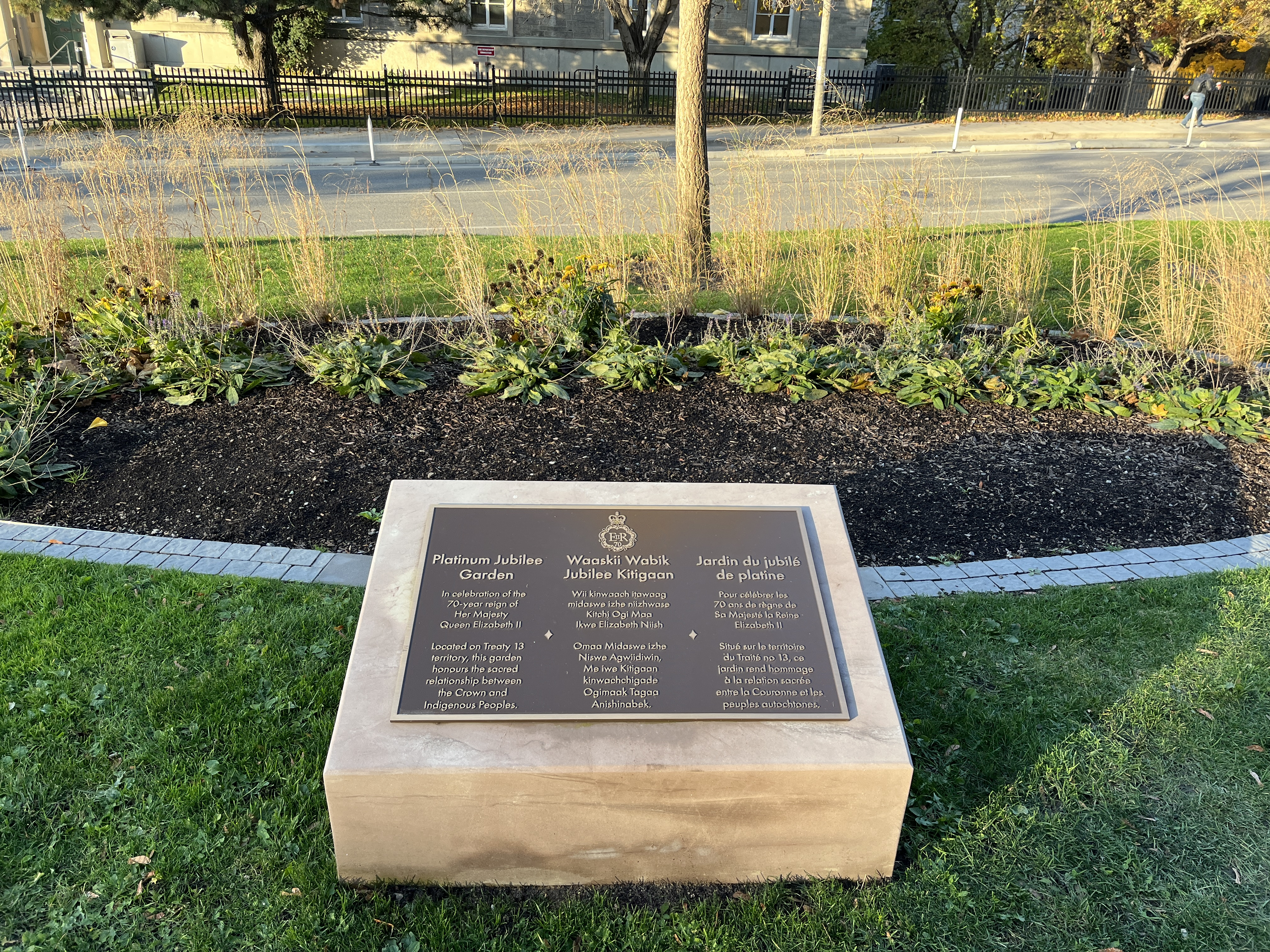
The Platinum Jubilee Garden planted in Queen's Park in Toronto, Ontario

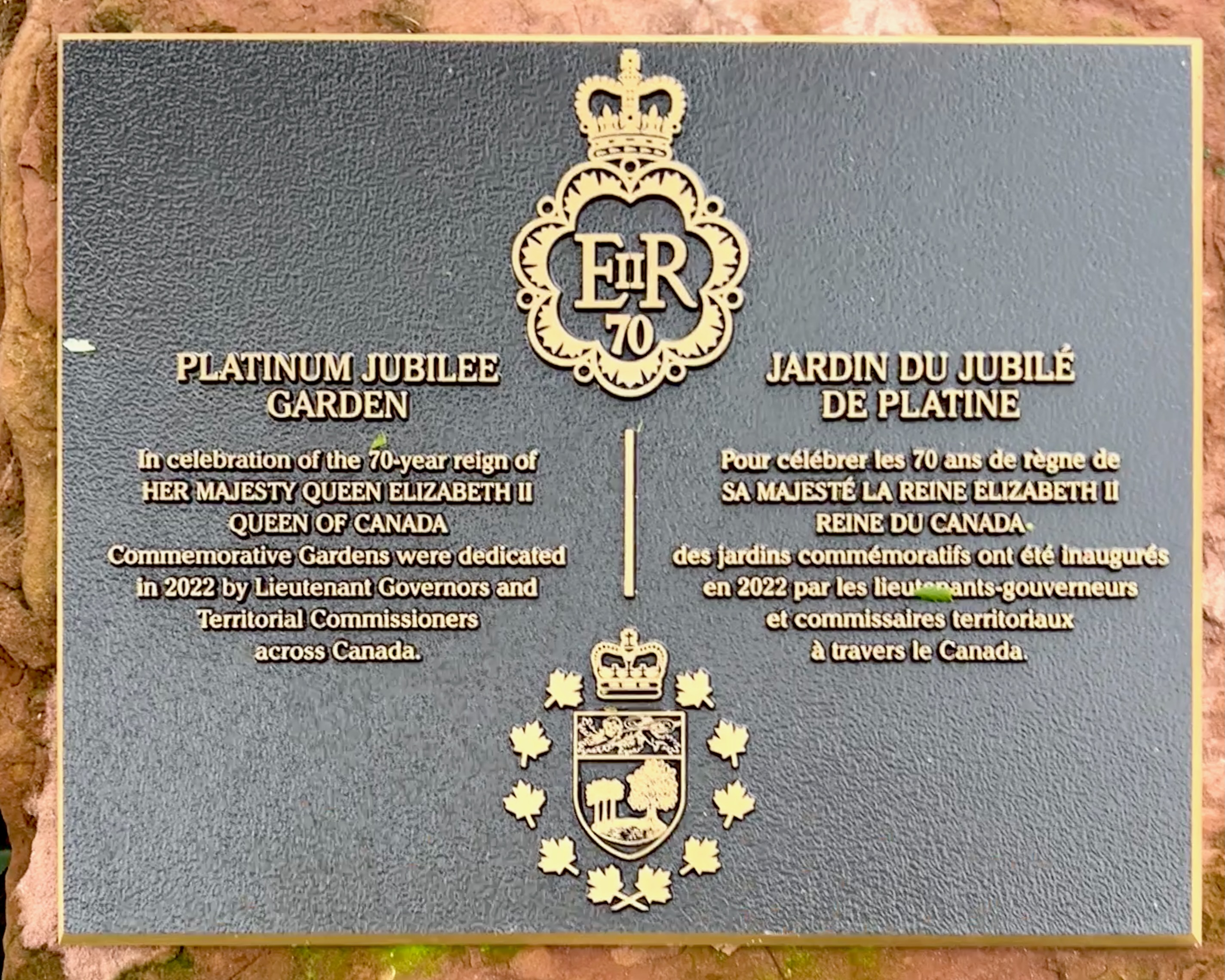
The plaque for the Platinum Jubilee Garden at Government House in Charlottetown, Prince Edward Island

Lieutenant governors and commissioners across Canada dedicated special gardens in their respective provinces or territory. Each of the 13 gardens included plants suited to the local climate, including tobacco, where climate and protocols allowed, providing the gardens with a representation of the relationship between the Canadian Crown and indigenous peoples of Canada through the treaties. Tobacco seeds were provided to viceregal offices and commissioners from plants grown for the Chapel Royal at Massey College. Another garden to represent the Crown's association with indigenous Canadians was unveiled at Mount Pleasant Nature Park in the County of Brant on 4 June.

The Prince Edward Island Crown-in-Council established a tree planting initiative to create a legacy for the jubilee by adding a stream to its Greening Spaces Program and, from Earth Day to 7 June, the town of Saint Andrews, New Brunswick, planted 70 trees. In May, members of the Royal Canadian Air Cadets also planted trees as a part of the Queen's Green Canopy project.

A commemorative plaster sculpture honouring the Queen's 70-year reign was put on display in the Senate of Canada Building. When Centre Block is fully restored, a final stone version of the sculpture will eventually cap the main arch above Centre Block's Senate foyer, near the Diamond Jubilee Window created in 2010.

==== Events from February to May ====
Several government houses organised jubilee events throughout the year. An exhibition was mounted at the Lieutenant Governor of Saskatchewan's official residence in Regina; titled Platinum on the Prairie: The Queen in Saskatchewan, which focused on the Queen's connection to the province. The portrait of the Queen that was commissioned for the diamond jubilee in 2012 also went on display at Government House in Saskatchewan. On 14 March, a time capsule was buried at Government House, British Columbia, which contains messages of hope for the future from viceroys and commissioners across Canada and is scheduled to be opened in 2072. The Alberta Legislature Building hosted on-site tours and displays for the jubilee.

An exhibit was unveiled on 2 March at the Canadian Museum of Nature, featuring a display of Canadian currency, postage stamps, and specimens of platinum. Woodstock Museum in Woodstock, Ontario, held several jubilee-themed programs from April to June and the Toronto Railway Museum hosted on 19 May an online lecture on Canadian royal trains used during the Queen's reign. Similarly, the Nova Scotia Archives launched a dedicated online collection of material related to the Queen's various tours of the province. As part of Winterlude in February, an ice sculpture was unveiled on Sparks Street, the main pedestrian mall in Ottawa, and, in the same vein, the city's ByWard Market was decorated in purple. In spring, Ottawa's Confederation Boulevard, as well as several places in provinces and territories, were decorated with banners featuring the jubilee colours. Prime Minister Justin Trudeau and Governor General Mary Simon were received in the audience by the Queen at Windsor Castle on 7 and 15 March respectively, where they both offered their congratulations to the Queen for reaching the milestone. At Canada House in London, a jubilee-themed window display was unveiled in April, featuring pictures from throughout the Queen's reign demonstrating her relationship with Canada.

On 9 April, the town of Melfort, Saskatchewan, held a high tea and, later, in Ontario, the Durham Chamber Orchestra performed a concert in Ajax, on 15 May, followed by a jubilee weekend in Amherstburg, held between the 20th and 21st of the same month, and attended by the province's Lieutenant Governor. Back in Ottawa, a corgi parade took place on 22 May.

Four days later, the Strathcona Ceremonial Mounted Troop were part of celebrations held in Armstrong, British Columbia; an event that was organized by the Armstrong Regional Co-op, the Canadian Armed Forces, and the Okanagan Military Tattoo Society. The Royal Canadian Mounted Police (of which the Queen is Commissioner-in-Chief) sent its Musical Ride to partake in the special Royal Windsor Horse Show, Platinum Jubilee Celebration: A Gallop Through History, at Windsor Castle on 15 May. RCMP officers greeted the Queen upon her arrival at the showground and performed other ceremonial duties riding the horses the force had given to the Queen.

Ahead of their jubilee tour of Canada, the Prince of Wales and the Duchess of Cornwall visited Canada House in London on 12 May. The couple met members of the Canadian diaspora and watched a small performance. Canadian High Commissioner Ralph Goodale said that the Crown and Canada have a "very egalitarian" relationship. He said it is not about empire, but Commonwealth, and the relationship "constantly reviews itself in modern terms, and that is the secret of its longevity".

==== Commemorations throughout summer ====
External videos
- Northern Lights - sound and light show – Summer 2022 Source: Canadian Heritage.

A new segment specifically about the Queen's 70 years of service to Canada was added to the annual Northern Lights sound and light show that runs from June to September on Parliament Hill, including images of the Queen's tours of Canada displayed through dynamic animation. A Canadian Heritage outdoor exhibition, The Queen and Canada, was presented from August to October at the Château Laurier hotel and features images of the Queen in Canada arranged along the hotel's promenade that faces the Rideau Canal. Prior to the lighting of The Queen's Platinum Jubilee Beacon in Ottawa, on the evening of 2 June (the 69th anniversary of Elizabeth II's coronation), a specially-scripted proclamation was read by town criers in multiple cities across Canada. In the evening, bagpipers across the country played the bugle calls "Diu Regnare" and "Majesty" and major federal and provincial buildings throughout the country were illuminated purple. A beacon was also lit on top of Canada House in London in the presence of Governor-General Mary Simon. In a statement, Simon encouraged Canadians across the country to work together to "truly honour the life, legacy and reign of Her Majesty The Queen". Twelve Canadian Armed Forces members representing the forces' three elements took part in the Platinum Jubilee Pageant in London on 5 June, along with military personnel from other Commonwealth countries.

In Aurora, Ontario, a commemorative bench was installed at Queen's Diamond Jubilee Park on 2 June, with a celebration taking place two days later, when seven images—one for each decade of the Queen's reign—were put on display and one of the town's Concerts in the Park series was dedicated to the jubilee as a musical tribute. The town also set up a website with educational resources and entertainments. "Majestic Celebrations: 70 Hats for 70 Years", a millinery exhibit, was held at the Burlington Central Library between 2 and 5 June. In Toronto, the Lieutenant Governor of Ontario hosted a platinum jubilee garden party on 5 June at the Aga Khan Museum and garden lunch and tea events took place on 4 and 5 June, as well as in Sarnia. The Royal Commonwealth Society of Toronto hosted a gala at the Fairmont Royal York on 17 June. The City of Toronto planted 70 large trees, one for each year of the Queen's reign, throughout Rowntree Mills Park, with the tree planting being attended by Mayor John Tory and Lieutenant Governor Elizabeth Dowdeswell.

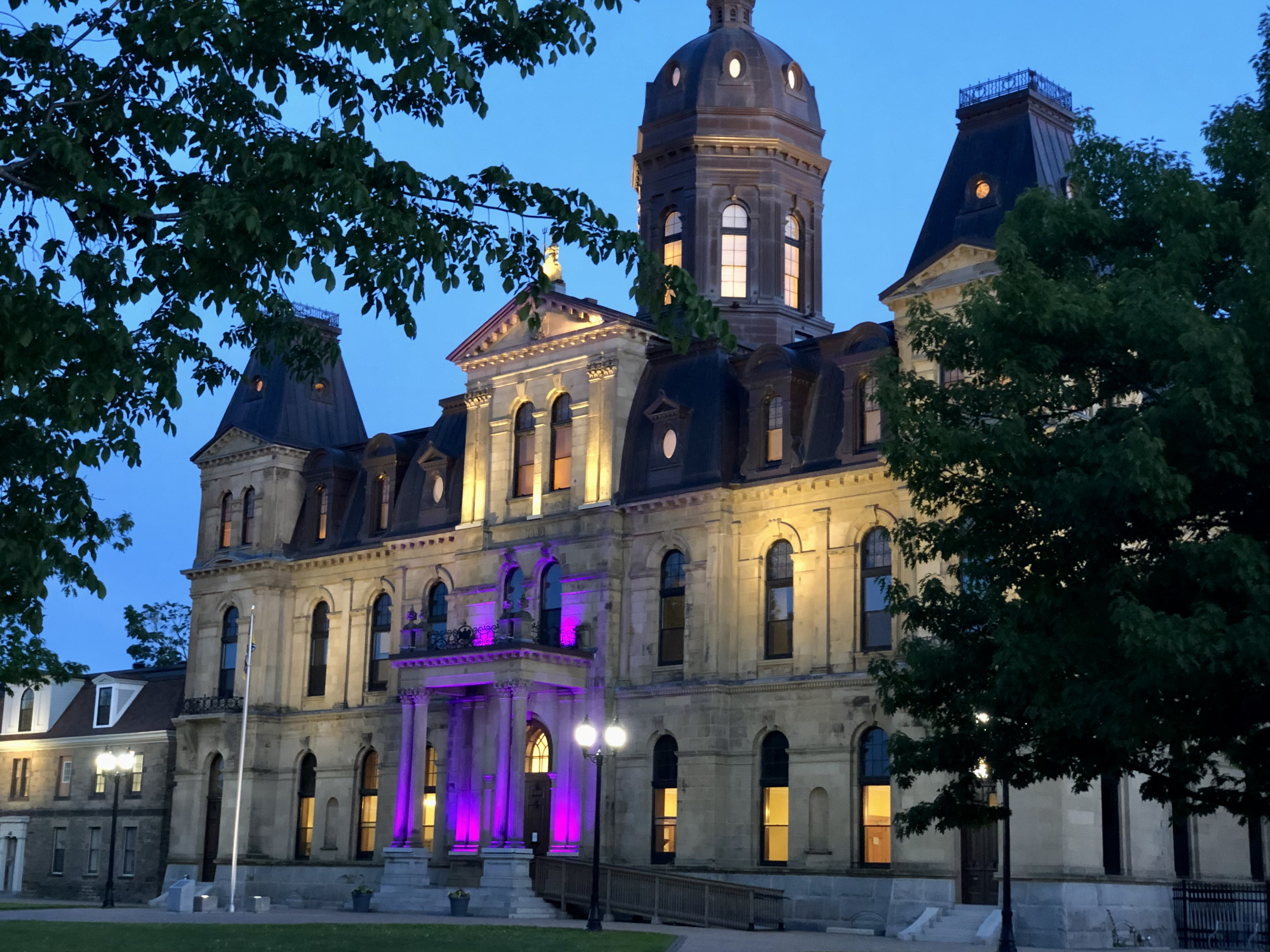
The New Brunswick Legislative Building

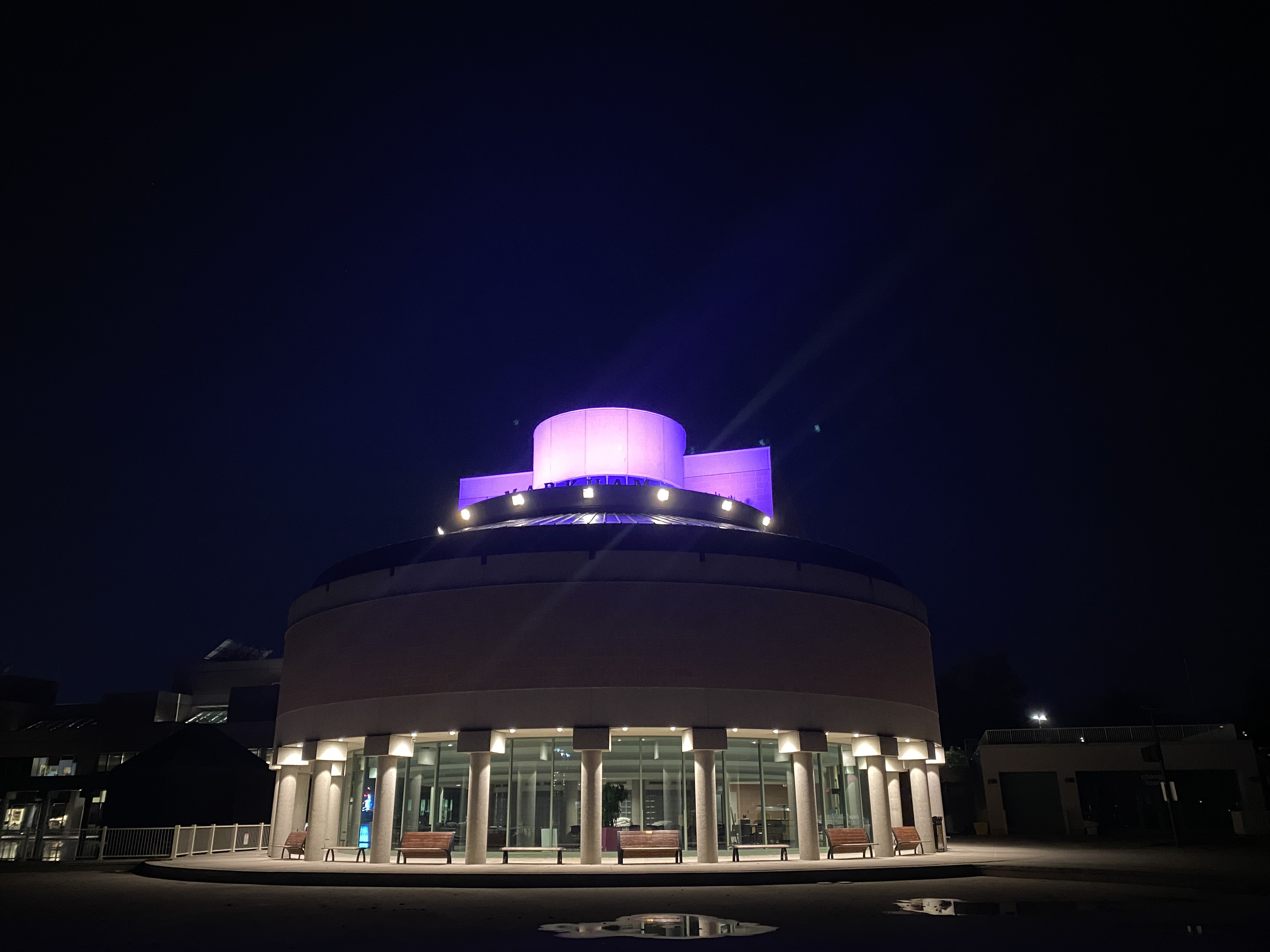
Markham Civic Centre

Buildings and landmarks in Canada illuminated in purple on 2 June

In Alberta, between 3 and 4 June, provincial museums and historic sites offered free admission and, on the second day, the Lieutenant Governor hosted a garden party on the grounds of Government House in Edmonton. Innisfail saw on 2 June the Royal Canadian Legion Pipe Band play and, two days later, at Ol' Moose Hall, the Innisfail and District Historical Society hosted the Queen's Platinum Jubilee Tea, which also honoured the Women's Institute, a community-based organization for women in the UK, Canada, South Africa, and New Zealand.

An exhibit on the Queen's visits to Newfoundland and Labrador was curated by The Rooms and mounted at Government House, St John's, where an open house was held on 3 June. The Lieutenant Governor attended a tea party in the town of Placentia on 6 June. A tree planting ceremony was held on 5 June in Centennial Park in Saint Andrews, New Brunswick, followed by a community church service at All Saints Church on King Street and a community garden party in front of the Anglican Parish Hall. In Fredericton, several events were held from 2 to 9 June, including a tree planting, a flag raising ceremony, and a concert on 16 June, in front of City Hall, which was lit in purple from 2 to 5 June. The Lieutenant Governor of Nova Scotia hosted platinum jubilee garden parties in Yarmouth on 16 July and in Cape Breton on 30 July. On 23 July, a platinum jubilee concert, featuring the Stadacona Band of the Royal Canadian Navy, was held at Government House in Halifax. On 1 July, a "double platinum" themed Canada Day celebration was held in Pugwash to commemorate both the platinum jubilees for both the Queen and the local Gathering of the Clans.

On 4 June, two refurbished British cannons, dating from 1810, were fired for a total of five times by the Westmount Battery, in Montreal's Mount Royal Cemetery, near Côte-des-Neiges Armoury. The last time they had been fired publicly was in 1897, for the Diamond Jubilee of Queen Victoria. A collection of memorabilia was displayed at Atwater Library and the proprietors of Clarence & Crisps shop in Hudson stated solar-powered, waving mini-statues of the Queen were the most popular item. On 13 July, a celebration was held at Davies Park, Montreal West. In a statement, the Lieutenant Governor of Quebec commended the Queen "for her many sacrifices and her selflessness".

Government House, British Columbia, hosted Platinum Jubilee Music on the Lawn, an outdoor concert series, over three nights on 7 July, 14 July, and 21 July. On 19 August, the Lieutenant Governor of British Columbia hosted a Platinum Jubilee Festival at Government House.

In Dawson City, a celebration was held at the local museum on 11 June. Starting 7 July, Taylor House, Yukon, hosted jubilee Thursdays all through July and August to celebrate the Queen's jubilee. On 13 August, the Commissioner of Yukon Angélique Bernard hosted a jubilee garden party at her residence in Dawson City. The next day, a celebration was held at the Keno City Mining Museum as part of the jubilee to mark the centennial of the visit of Governor General Lord Byng to the Keno region's silver mines.

=== Australia ===
Queen Elizabeth II was the first Australian monarch to celebrate a platinum jubilee, and a range of national and community events were held across the country. "We plan to hold a range of events to coincide with key dates throughout 2022, to show our respect and appreciation for seven decades of service", said then Prime Minister Scott Morrison.

The Australian Department of Agriculture, Water and the Environment also launched a tree planting initiative. The Australian Government provided up to A$15.1 million of grant funding in 2022 to eligible groups and organisations for community-based tree planting events.

Australians were able to submit a personal message of congratulations and thanks to the Queen on the Australian Government's Platinum Jubilee website from 2 to 16 June 2022. Messages were collated and sent to Buckingham Palace and archived by the Commonwealth of Australia.

==== Accession Day events in Australia ====
On 6 February, buildings and monuments throughout Australia were lit in purple. Statements were released by Morrison, Governor-General David Hurley and the governors of the Australian states.

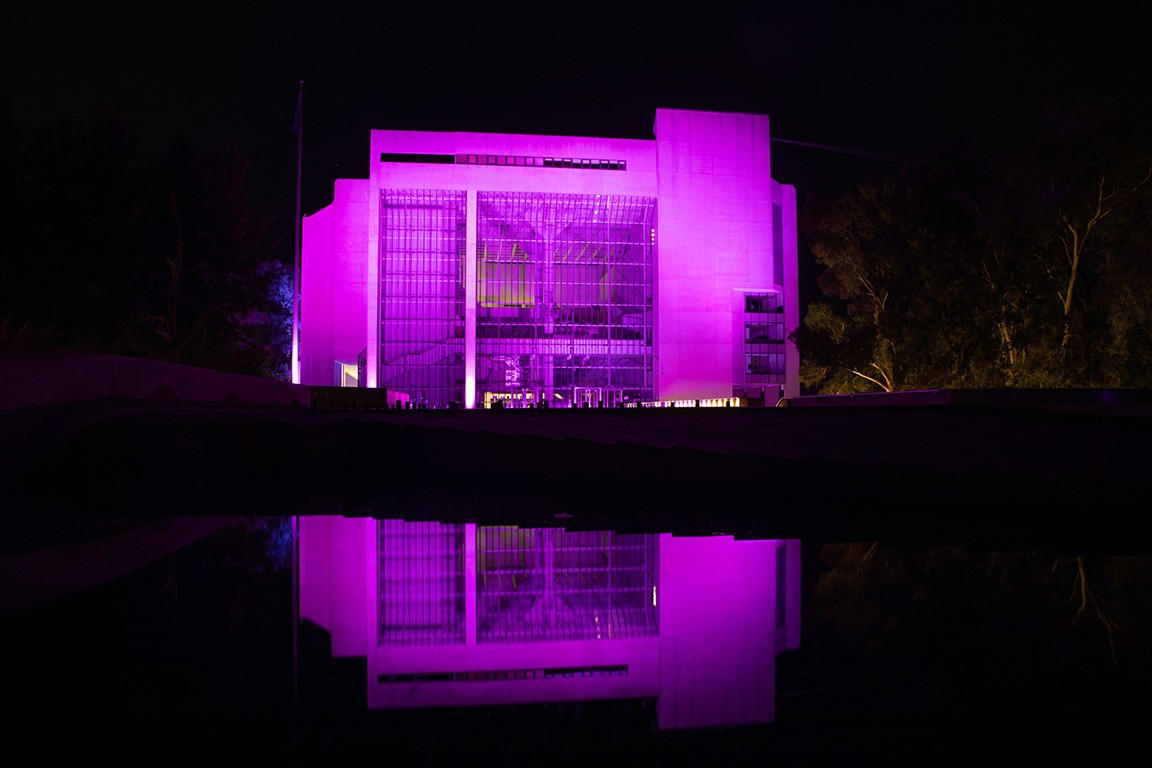
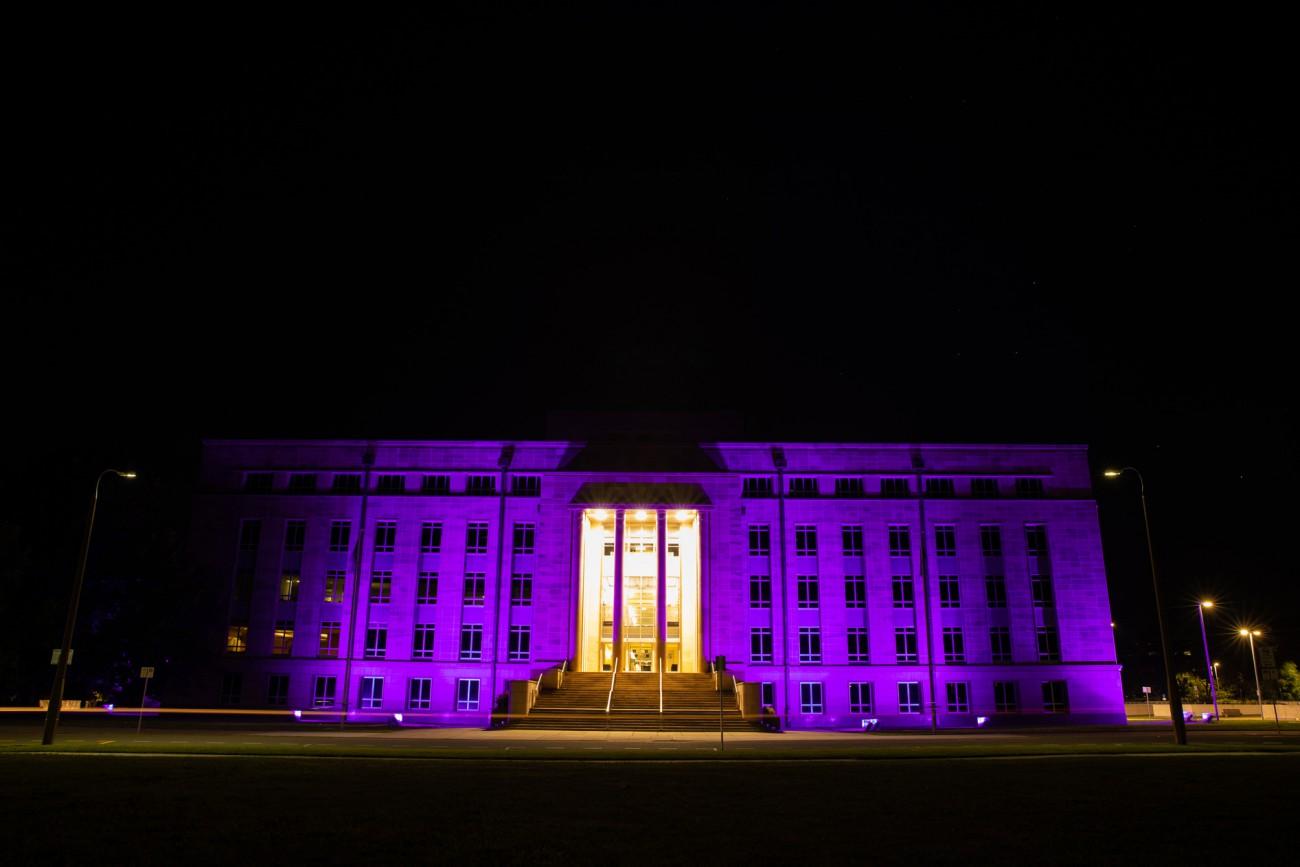
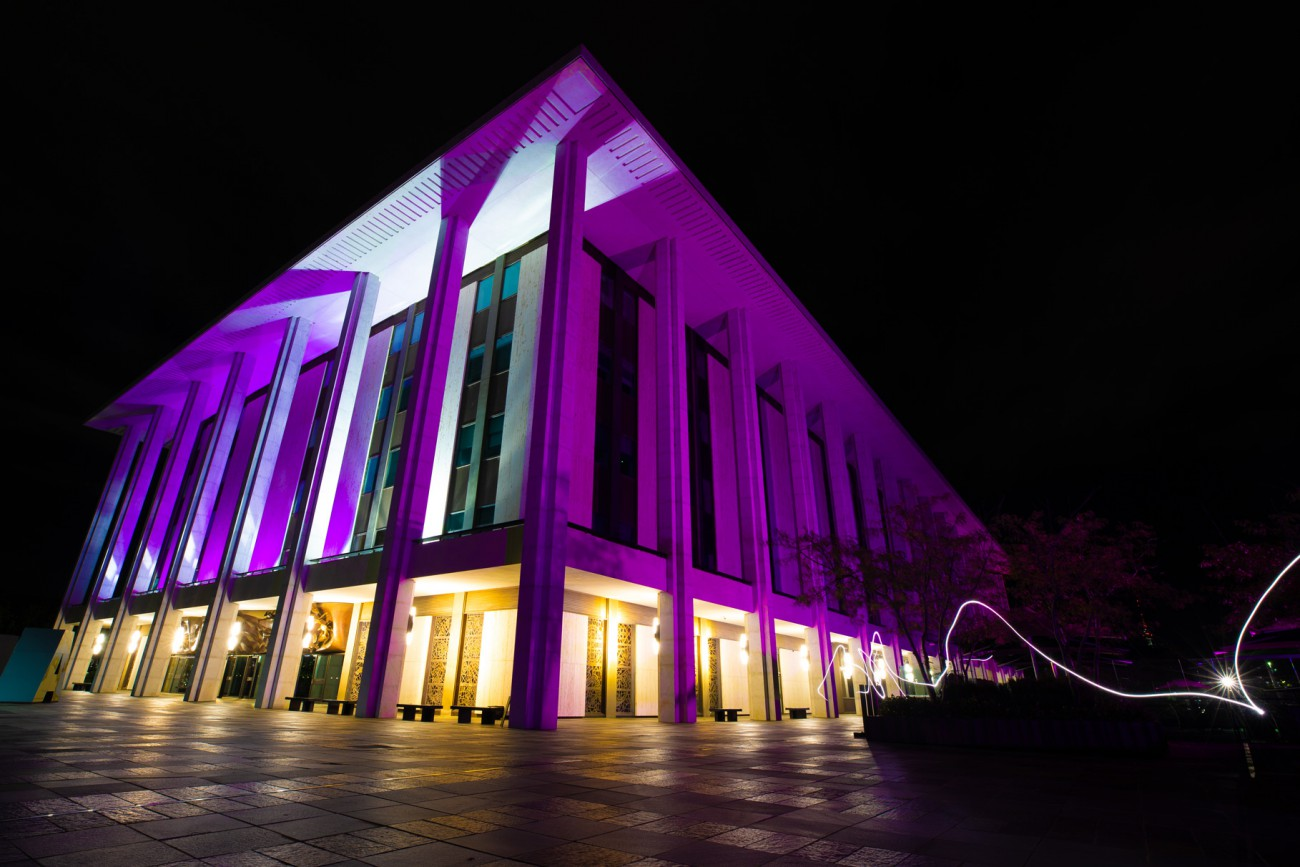
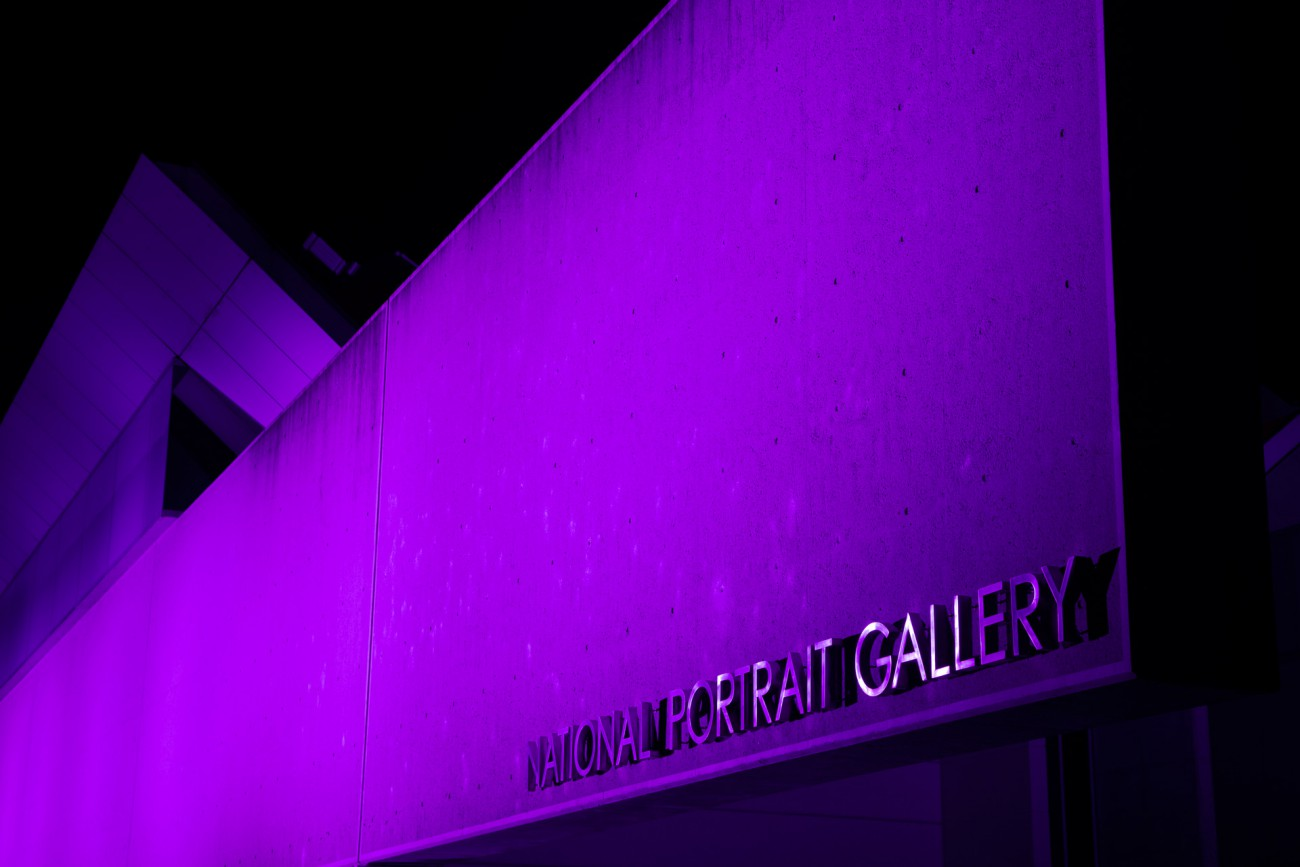
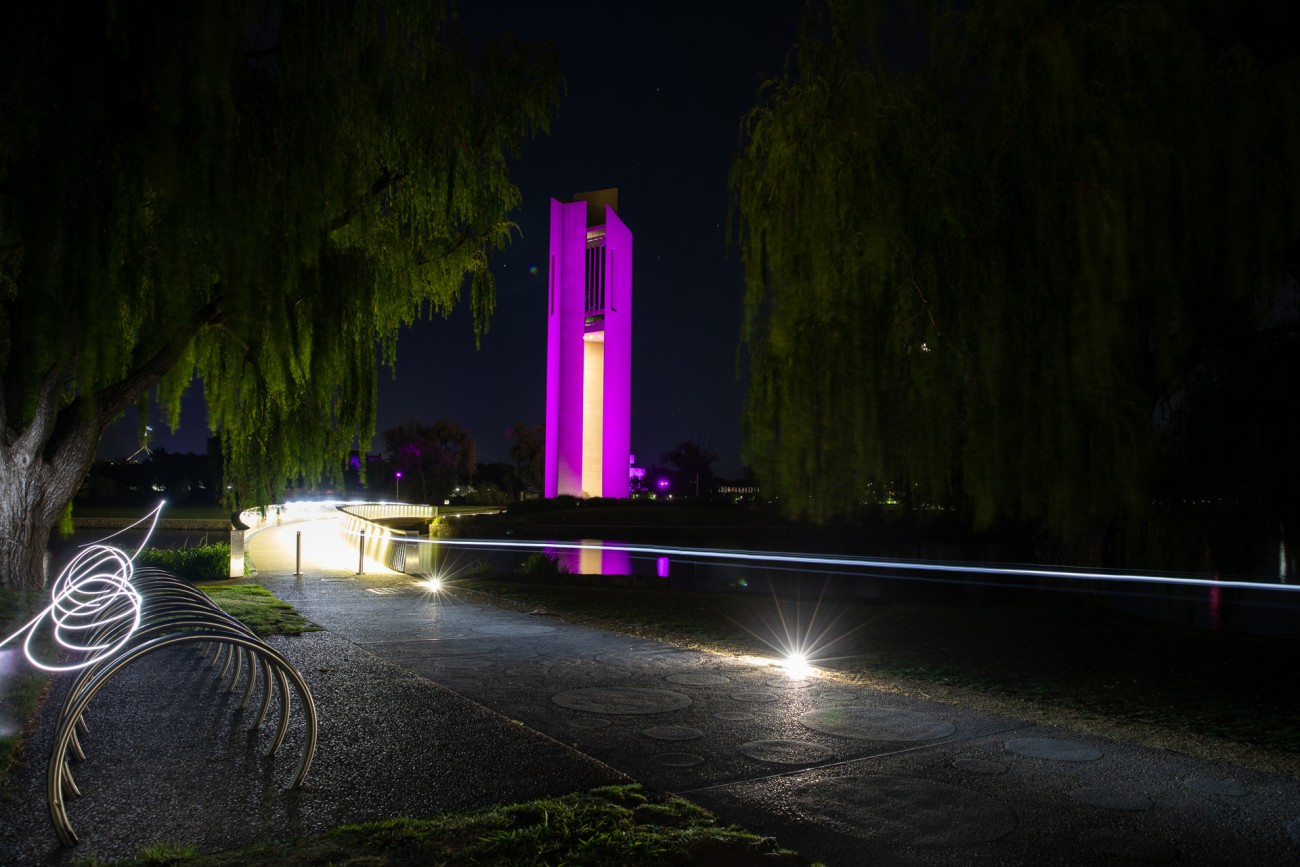
To mark the start of the platinum jubilee year, buildings across Australia were lit in royal purple.
Left to right: the High Court of Australia, the John Gorton Building, the National Library of Australia, the National Portrait Gallery, and the National Carillon.

Services were held in churches across Australia. In Canberra, evensong at St Paul's Church, Manuka was attended by the governor-general of Australia. Several state governors also attended evensong services, including the governor of New South Wales at St James' Church, Sydney, the governor of Tasmania at St David's Cathedral, Hobart, the governor of Victoria at St Paul's Cathedral, Melbourne, the governor of Western Australia at St George's Cathedral, Perth, and the governor of South Australia at St Paul's Anglican Church, Port Adelaide. The latter event was also attended by the premier of South Australia.

==== Memorabilia ====
Commemorative stamps and coins were released in Australia.

On 5 April, two commemorative stamps were released by Australia Post: a $1.10 stamp featuring an image of the Queen from 1952 by Dorothy Wilding, and a $3.50 stamp which displays a 2019 photograph of the Queen. A range of collectables accompanied the stamp release.

The Perth Mint released three celebratory coins on 5 April. The coins – two gold, and one silver – feature the shield of the royal coat of arms alongside the floral emblems of England, Ireland, Scotland and Australia on one side; and the Queen's first (1953) and current (2019) coin effigies on the other.

The Royal Australian Mint released a commemorative 50c coin on 5 May. The coin depicts intertwining golden wattle branches, the national floral emblem of Australia; and the lily of the valley flowers, the Queen's favourite flower. The centre of the coin includes the Queen's royal cypher. Inspired by the 1977 Australian silver jubilee 50c coin, the platinum jubilee coin also features a fan of 70 crowns set behind a central St Edward's Crown.

==== Commemorations in June ====
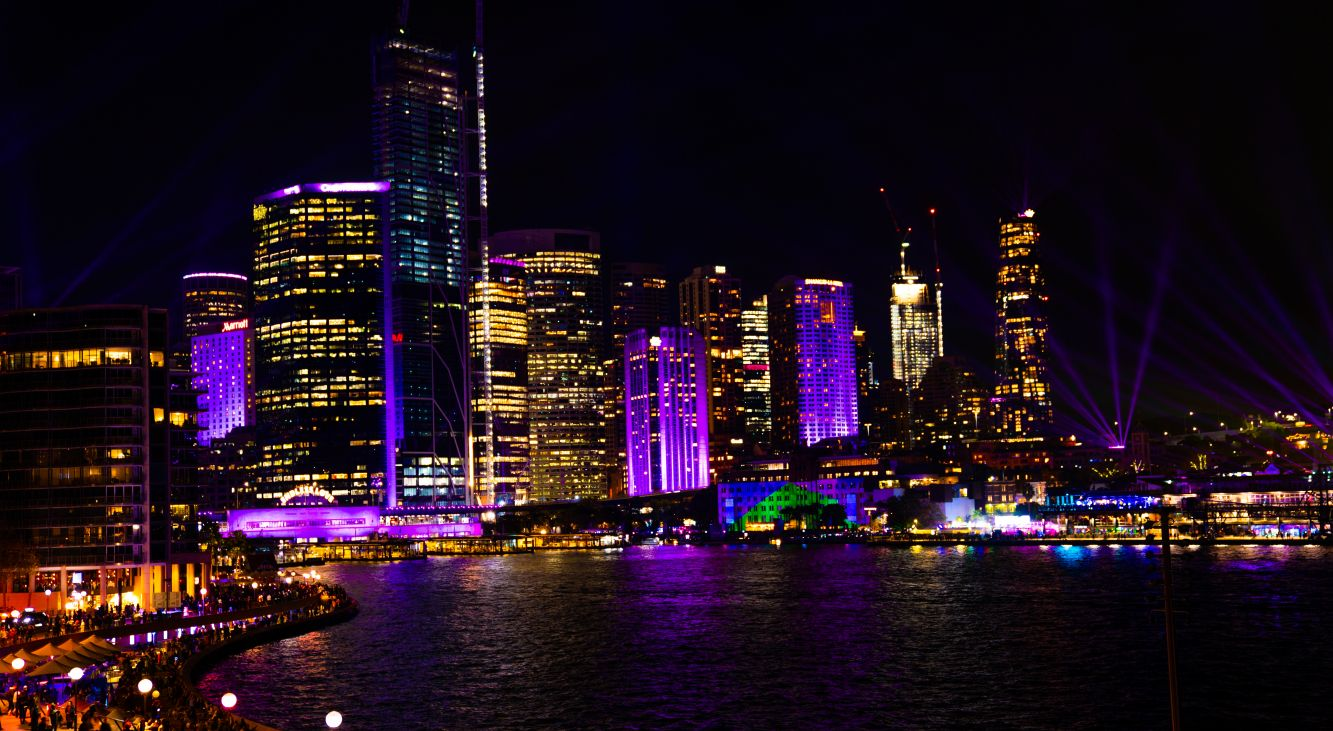
Buildings lit in Sydney for the jubilee, June 2022

The Queen's Platinum Jubilee was officially celebrated in Australia from 2 to 5 June 2022. During this period, buildings and monuments throughout Australia were illuminated in purple to mark the occasion.

On 2 June, the Blue Mountains Pipe Band played the tune Diu Regnare, written especially for the jubilee, in the Blue Mountains. At Government House, Perth, the Governor of Western Australia dedicated a new garden to the Queen. On the same day, a beacon was lit in Canberra, by Prime Minister Anthony Albanese. He later remarked that his birth was "somewhat potentially delayed" during the Queen's tour in 1963 because his "mother insisted on seeing the tribute to Queen Elizabeth on her way to the hospital, she insisted on going via the city to ensure she saw all of the commemorations at that time".

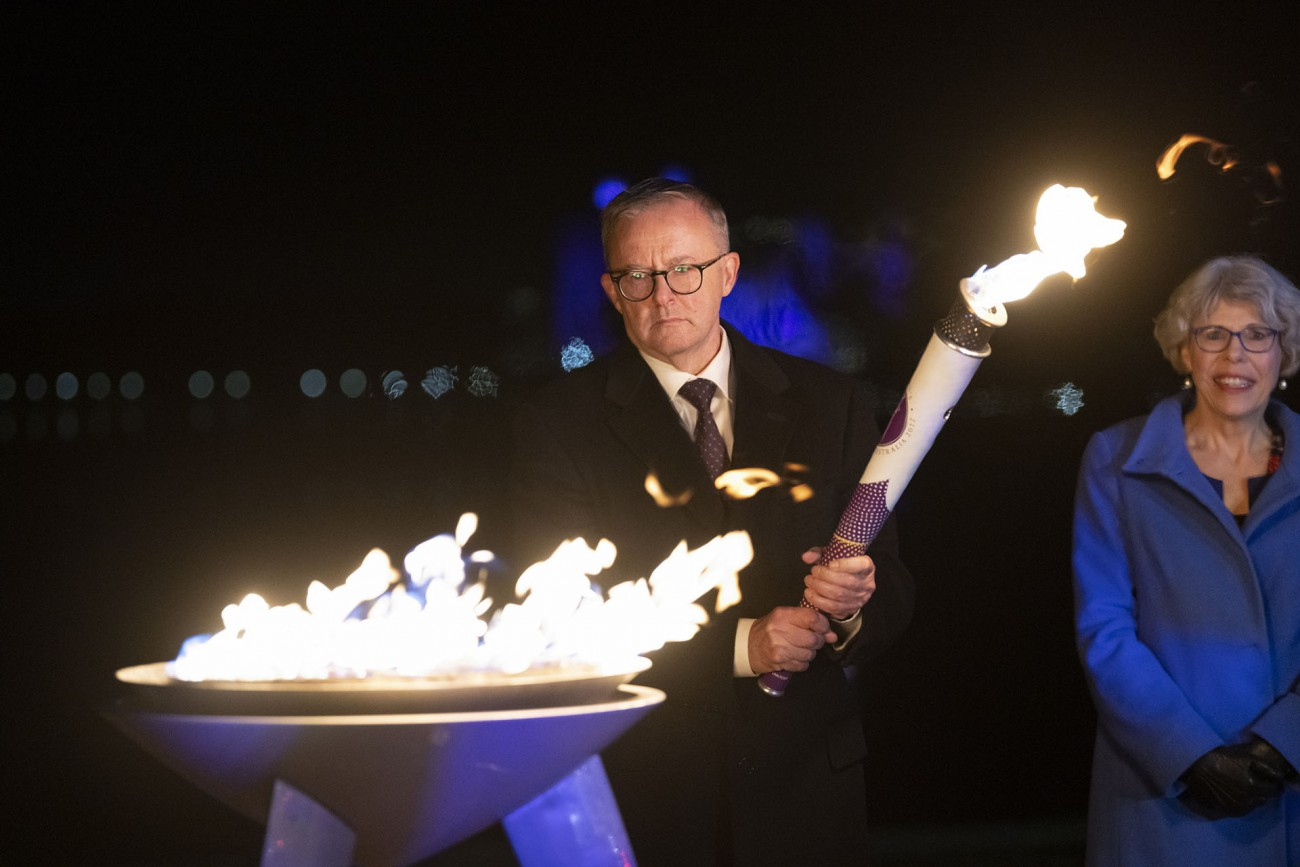
Prime Minister Anthony Albanese lighting the jubilee beacon in Canberra

From 2 to 13 June, the Department of the Prime Minister and Cabinet Library hosted a display in the public foyer in the Andrew Fisher Building, featuring artifacts and contemporary items relating to the platinum jubilee. The Bible Museum celebrated the jubilee from 2 to 17 June with a big display of commemorative royal Bibles, which included a special Bible published for the platinum jubilee. From 2 June to 31 December, the National Capital Exhibition presented The Queen and Me, celebrating the Queen's 14 visits to Canberra during her 70-year reign. It featured family photographs, and mementos of the day, and personal stories of what their interactions with the Queen have meant to the people of Canberra.

On 3 June, the Administrator of the Northern Territory hosted Music on the Lawn: A Jubilee Event at Government House, which featured The Band of the 1st Brigade and Australian Army Band Sydney who performed a contemporary program of music.

On 4 June, Aspen Island in Canberra's Lake Burley Griffin, an island lying within the Parliamentary Triangle and which features the National Carillon, was renamed Queen Elizabeth II Island during a special event. The ceremony also included dedicating the new Queen Elizabeth Water Gardens, which transformed the nearby foreshore as well as improve water quality. The event also included a 21-gun salute and RAAF flypast. In a message, the Queen remarked that the renaming of the island was "a lovely and kind gesture", and hoped that "Queen Elizabeth II Island continues to provide a place of enjoyment for all who go there".

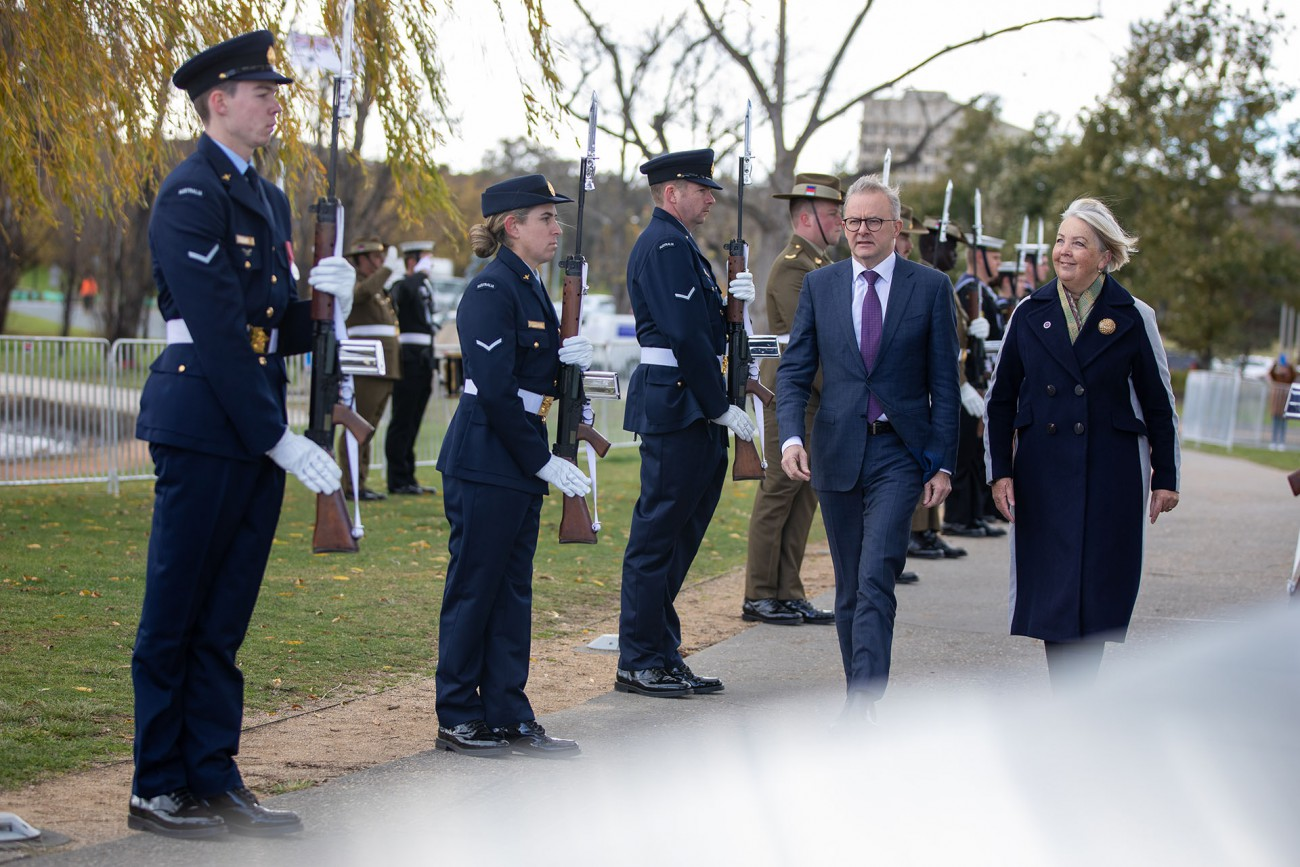
Ceremony for the Aspen Island renaming ceremony on 4 June. The island was renamed Queen Elizabeth II Island in honour of the jubilee.

St Andrew's Cathedral, Sydney, hosted a concert 'Happy and Glorious' on 4 June, with royal music including Handel's Zadok the Priest, Parry's I was glad, Walton's Orb and Sceptre Coronation march and works by Vaughan Williams, Byrd and Rutter, and the Australian premiere of the official platinum jubilee anthem, In Our Service. From 4 June to 13 June, Parliament House hosted special tours featuring representations of the Queen in the Parliament House art collection, such as Sir William Dargie's Wattle Queen and John Dowie's bronze statue of Queen Elizabeth II on Queen's Terrace.

On 5 June, a Service of Thanksgiving took place at St John's Anglican Cathedral, Brisbane, attended by the governor of Queensland. Another service of thanksgiving was held at the Loch Public Hall. The same day, Government House, Adelaide, opened for visitors to view public rooms, and see the workings of the House and view the statue of the Queen.

41 members of the Australian Defence Force contingent from the Federation Guard took part in the Platinum Jubilee Pageant in London on 5 June. Cheers of "Aussie Aussie Aussie" were heard as the Australian contingent marched by. From 10 June to 30 December, the Australian Racing Museum, whose patron is the Queen, presented an online exhibition featuring a collection of objects, photographs and records held in the museum collection. The Australian Army continued Platinum Jubilee celebrations in Canberra with Royal Military College – Duntroon's Queen's Birthday Parade on 11 June. On 12 June, the Australian government announced a contribution of $10,000 to Wildlife SEQ Inc., in honour of the jubilee. The same day, All Saints Anglican Church, South Hobart, celebrated the jubilee with a Festal Choral Evensong. On 18 June, the Blackstone-Ipswich Cambrian Choir hosted a concert at St Paul's Anglican Church, Ipswich, featuring music from the Queen's Coronation, such as Handel's Zadok the Priest and Parry's I was glad.

==== Other events ====
On 3 February, the governor of Victoria hosted a reception at Government House, Melbourne. Those in attendance included representatives from Victorian organisations to which the Queen and other members of the royal family have a connection. On 5 February, the governor of New South Wales hosted a tree planting and garden reception to commemorate the jubilee, at Government House, Sydney. The governor planted a red oak. On 7 February, the governor of Tasmania hosted a reception for the Royal Over-Seas League and other Commonwealth societies. On 8 February, a motion introduced by Morrison was passed by the Australian House of Representatives, in which the House offered their "warmest congratulations" to the Queen. Morrison and the Leader of the Opposition, Anthony Albanese, also offered their personal congratulations to the Queen.

From 5 February to 27 February, Parliament House hosted guided tours, titled Platinum Jubilee in portrait. These featured artistic representations of the Queen from the Parliament House art collection, including Sir William Dargie's Wattle Queen, the statue of the Queen in the Queen's Terrace Café, and depictions of the State Opening of Parliament in 1954 and 1974 and the opening of Parliament House in 1988.

On 13 March, Government House, Brisbane hosted an open day, allowing the public to tour parts of the building and its gardens.

On 5 August, all Royal Australian Infantry Corps battalion colours were paraded for the first time at the School of Infantry to mark the Jubilee. On 6 August, The Queen's Platinum Jubilee Concert, directed by Alexander Voltz, occurred at St John's Cathedral, Brisbane.

The Royal Queensland Show and the Queensland Government hosted the Queen's Platinum Jubilee Celebration Cake Competition. The cakes were displayed from 6 to 14 August in the Fine Arts Precinct of the Ekka's Channel 7 Pavilion.

=== New Zealand ===
==== Tributes and commemoration ====
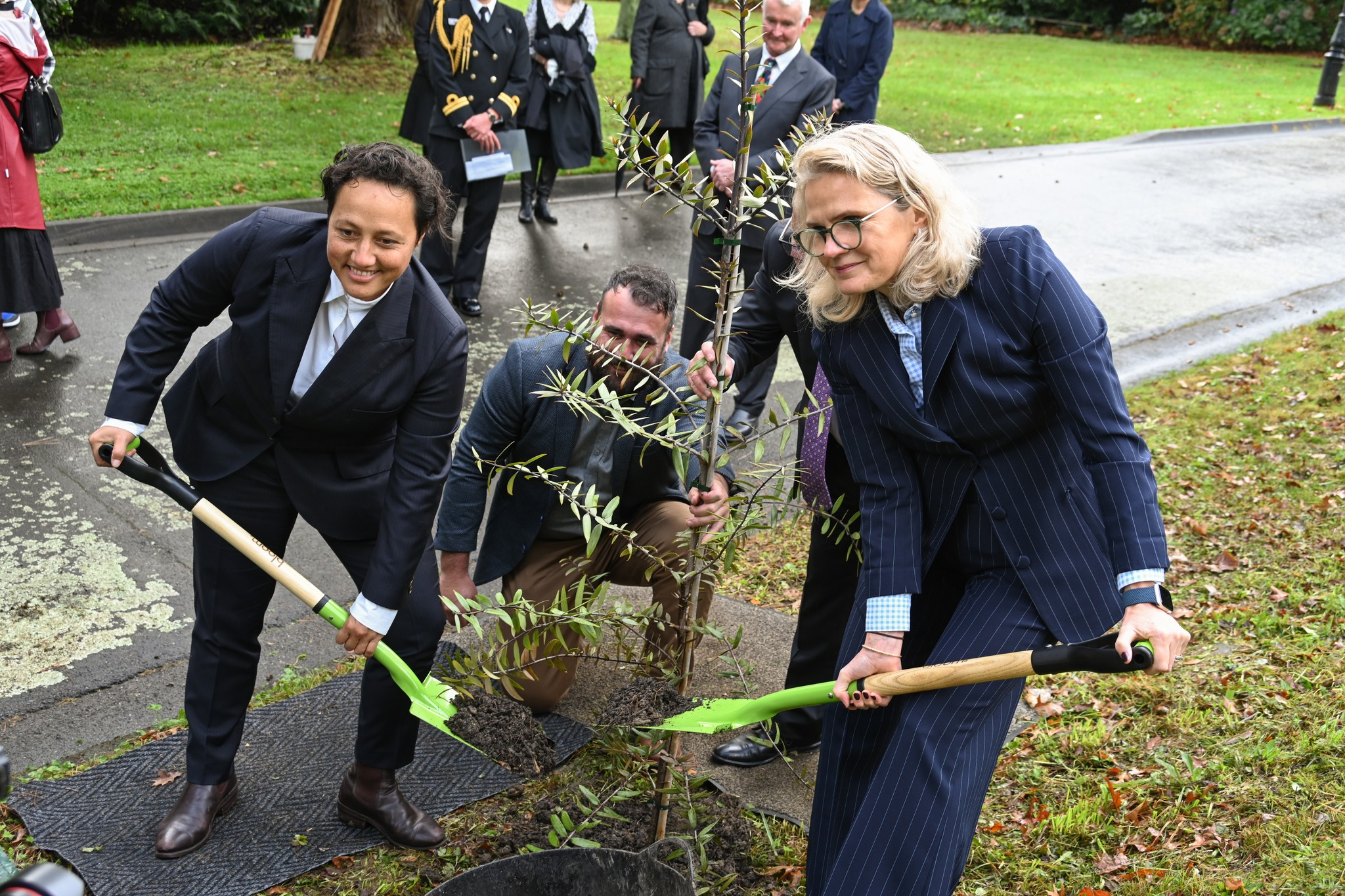
Tree planting at Government House to launch the Trees that Count Legacy Project for the jubilee, May 2022

On Accession Day, Prime Minister Jacinda Ardern congratulated the Queen and wished her well on behalf of New Zealanders. Ardern announced that the government would donate $1 million to Trees That Count to assist with tree planting programmes across New Zealand. Trees That Count is working with the Department of Conservation to support the planting of 100,000 native trees at 15 native restoration projects across New Zealand. The project was launched on 16 May at Government House, where Dame Helen Winkelmann, the administrator of the government, and Kiri Allan, minister of conservation, planted a kauri.

From Point Jerningham, Wellington, a 21-gun salute was fired by personnel from the 16th Field Regiment, Royal Regiment of New Zealand Artillery, on 7 February.

On 9 February, Ardern moved a motion and was passed in the House of Representatives congratulating the Queen on her jubilee.

Commemorative coins were released by NZ Post. A bulletin article – The Queen on New Zealand's Currency – was commissioned by the Reserve Bank of New Zealand to mark the Jubilee.

At Te Awamutu, a plaque was erected to commemorate both the jubilee and the Queen and Prince Philip's visit to Te Awamutu in 1954. The plaque, which was approved by the Queen, was erected on the old Te Awamutu Post Office building.

==== Events from June ====
On 2 June, at midday, a 21-gun salute was fired at Point Jerningham, Wellington. In the evening, a beacon was lit on the steps to the Tangi Te Keo Mt Victoria lookout in Wellington, by former governor-general Sir Jerry Mateparae and the mayor of Wellington, Andy Foster. A bonfire was lit in Christchurch and the Sky Tower in Auckland was lit up in red, yellow, and orange as a jubilee beacon.

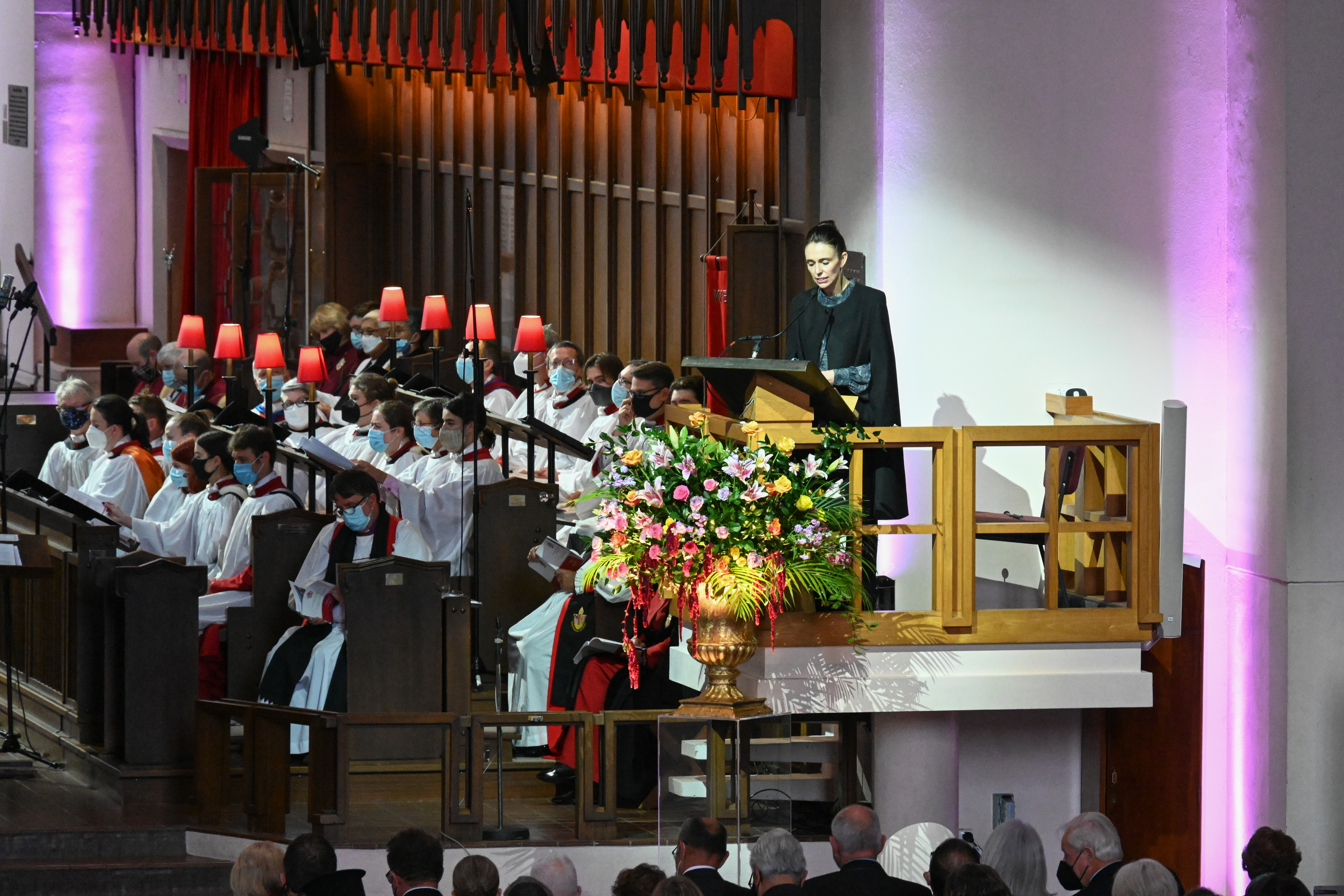
Prime Minister Jacinda Ardern speaking at the platinum jubilee service of celebration at Wellington Cathedral of St Paul on 3 June 2022

A service of celebration took place on 3 June at Wellington Cathedral of St Paul. The service featured reflections about the Queen from former deputy prime minister and secretary-general of the Commonwealth, Sir Don McKinnon, and Queen's Young Leader award winner Ezekiel Raui.

On 3 June, Prime Minister Ardern announced that a trail on Stewart Island / Rakiura, previously known as Observation Rock Track, would be renamed Queen Elizabeth II Platinum Jubilee Path.

A contingent of 42 personnel from the New Zealand Defence Force marched in the Platinum Jubilee Pageant in London on 5 June.

The 2022 Queen's Birthday and Platinum Jubilee Honours List was announced on 6 June 2022. A 21-round salute was fired using a 1941 field gun at Timaru's Caroline Bay. Auckland's Sky Tower was lit in purple for the occasion.

=== Pakistan ===
On 2 June, a jubilee beacon by lit by the Ministry of Foreign Affairs in Islamabad.

On 8 June, Prime Minister Shehbaz Sharif attended a jubilee celebration hosted by the High Commission of the United Kingdom, Islamabad. The Pakistan Monument was lit up in purple to mark the Jubilee.

=== Ghana ===
On 2 June, First Lady Rebecca Akufo-Addo lit a beacon in Accra, at a ceremony organised by the Rotary Club Ghana.

The Ghana Society-UK celebrated at the Luton International Carnival on 4 June.

On 10 June, the Ministry of Lands and Natural Resources held a tree planting at the Achimota Forest.

=== Malaysia ===
On 2 June, Rotary Malaysia District 3300 lit a beacon. The Malaysian British Society held a golf day for charity, on 2 June, and members of the British Armed Forces based at Butterworth Air Base held a garden party from all Five Power Defence Arrangements member nations.

On 5 June, soldiers from the 1st Battalion of the Royal Malay Regiment (RMR) marched in the pageant in London. The Yang di-Pertuan Agong congratulated the Queen and hailed her as a "ruler who cares about the welfare of the people".

The British High Commission hosted an official reception later in June.

=== Jamaica ===
On Accession Day, Governor-General Sir Patrick Allen, congratulated the Queen.

The Queen's Platinum Jubilee Medal was presented to members of the Jamaica Defence Force, the Jamaica Constabulary Force, the Department of Correctional Services, the Jamaica Fire Brigade and the Emergency Medical Services.

=== Trinidad and Tobago ===
President Paula-Mae Weekes attended the Royal Windsor Horse Show in May. At Windsor Castle, Weekes presented the Queen with a gift from the people of Trinidad and Tobago. The gift, Woman on the Bass, was designed and produced by artist Gillian Bishop.

=== Kenya ===
In Aberdare Open Fields, close to Treetops Hotel where the Queen received the news of her accession, the Earl of Wessex and Forfar planted a tree on 16 March.

On 2 June, a beacon was lit jointly by the High Commissioners of Barbados and India to Kenya, at an event held by Nairobi's Rotary Club in Karen.

=== Malta ===
The Central Bank of Malta commissioned two commemorative coins for the jubilee and they were minted by the Royal Dutch Mint. MaltaPost also issued a stamp in a miniature sheet for the occasion on 2 June.

On 2 June, a tune called Diu Regnare, was played on bagpipes outside the Queen's former Pietá house – Villa Guardamangia. Rotary Club Malta lit a jubilee beacon at the Msida Bastion Historic Garden in Floriana; attendees to the event included British High Commissioner Katherine Ward. On the same day, the Gozo Community Choir sang A Life Lived With Grace in a ceremony at Munxar on Gozo.

=== Zambia ===
To mark the Queen's jubilee, Rotary International District 9210 and the Wildlife Environment Conservation Society of Zambia (WECSZ) partnered to plant at least 50 indigenous trees in each of the 10 provincial capitals of Zambia.

=== The Gambia ===
On 2 June, Rotary Club in the Gambia lit beacons at Tamala Beach Hotel.

The British High Commission in Banjul hosted government officials, and members of the diplomatic community at a reception on 3 June.

=== Barbados ===
Prime Minister Mia Mottley attended a celebration at the British High Commission on 1 June. Mottley congratulated the Queen and said "all of us are grateful" for the Queen's work at bringing stability to the Commonwealth.

=== Samoa ===
On 6 June, the jubilee was marked with a tree planting ceremony at the Vailima Botanical Gardens. As part of the Queen's Green Canopy, the British High Commissioner announced UK's funding contribution of £10,000 (SAT $33.2K) towards the Vailima Botanical Garden Zoning Project for the installation of accessibility resources for people with disabilities.

On 9 June, Samoan government officials, including acting Prime Minister Tuala Iosefo Ponifasio, opposition leader and former Prime Minister Tuilaʻepa Saʻilele Malielegaoi, and members of the Legislative Assembly, attended a platinum jubilee reception hosted by the British High Commissioner at the Robert Louis Stevenson Museum at Vailima.

=== Bangladesh ===
President Mohammad Abdul Hamid and Prime Minister Sheikh Hasina sent congratulatory messages.

On 25 May, the Speaker of the Bangladesh Parliament Shirin Sharmin Chaudhury was the guest of honour at a reception at the British High Commission.

On 2 June, the High Commissions of Canada, India, and the United Kingdom in Dhaka were lit up in purple.

=== Bahamas ===
At The Retreat Garden National Park in Nassau, on 28 January, two lignum vitae trees were planted by the commanding officer of HMS Medway, which is part of the Royal Navy's permanent presence in the region, providing humanitarian aid and working with local law enforcement on stopping the flow of illegal drugs. Also present were members of the Bahamas National Trust and the UK High Commission in Nassau.

A series of commemorative stamps was released by The Bahamas on 17 March.

=== Papua New Guinea ===
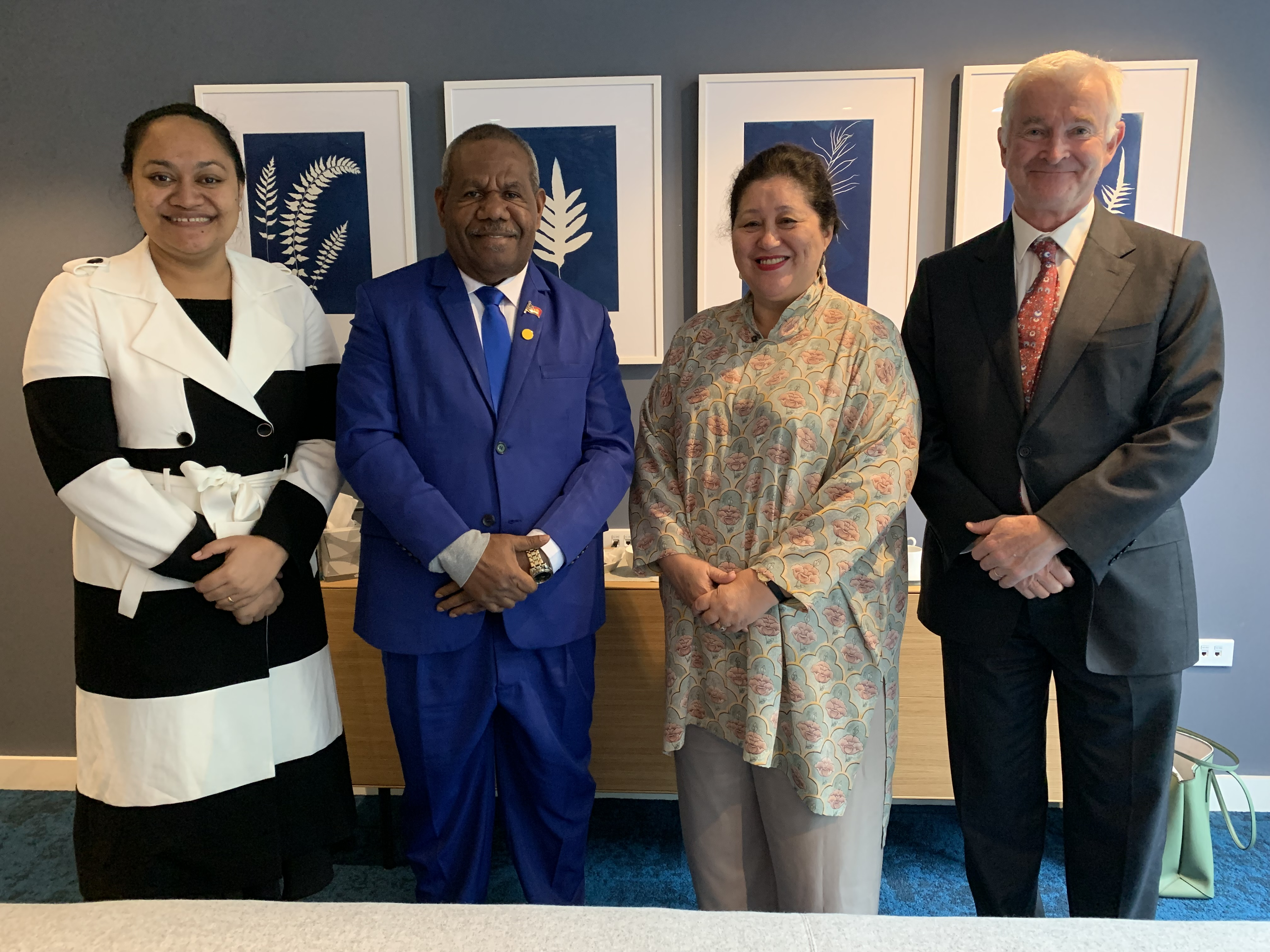
(Left to right) Lady Tufi Dadae, Governor-General of Papua New Guinea Grand Chief Sir Bob Dadae, Governor-General of New Zealand Dame Cindy Kiro, and Dr Richard Davies in London, UK, for Platinum Jubilee events, 6 June 2022

On Accession Day, Governor-General Sir Bob Dadae reflected on the Queen's life and said that Papua New Guineans are proud to have Elizabeth II as their Queen. He said:

Despite personal tragedies and setbacks in both her personal and public life, the Queen has continued to hold fast to her duty and service throughout the last 70 years. As a nation, we are indeed proud to have the Queen as our Head of State. A nation of a thousand tribes and cultural diversity in a land of diverse biodiversity, we join our voices to congratulate our Queen and Head of State on achieving this historic milestone.

Considerations were being made to reserve a portion of Papua New Guinea's rainforests in honour of the Queen, given how she is "passionate for the preservation of rainforests".

=== Solomon Islands ===
The jubilee was celebrated in Solomon Islands on 2 and 3 June, with 3 June being an official public holiday.

The celebrations began in the morning of 2 June with a police band drum-beating ceremony in open vehicles from Henderson Police Station to White River amidst cheering groups waving flags along the highway at various locations in the city. Later in the evening, a thanksgiving service, cake cutting and lighting of a bonfire took place at the Saint Barnabas Anglican Cathedral.

On 3 June, the planting of trees took place at Government House, followed by a reception for dignitaries and guests.

=== Tuvalu ===
Commemorative stamps were released by Tuvalu on 6 February.

=== Saint Lucia ===
On 3 June 2022, Acting Governor-General Errol Charles and his wife congratulated the Queen on behalf of Saint Lucians.

=== Belize ===
Platinum jubilee medals were awarded, including to those who served during Hurricanes Hurricane Eta and Iota that flooded much of Cayo, and to those who served during the COVID-19 pandemic.

On 2 June, a beacon was lit at the Governor General's Field next to Belize House, Belmopan.

=== Antigua and Barbuda ===
The Antigua and Barbuda Scout Association and the Rotary Club of Antigua lit a beacon at Government House, St John's on 2 June.

=== Saint Kitts and Nevis ===
On Accession Day, Governor-General Sir Tapley Seaton, congratulated the Queen on behalf of the government and people of Saint Kitts and Nevis.

At Government House in Nevis, tree planting ceremonies took place on 14 March that was attended by Hyleeta Liburd, the deputy governor-general of Nevis. The Nevisian premier's ministry plans to plant trees at six locations in Nevis, leading up to 2 June.

On 2 June, a beacon was lit at the Nevis Athletic Stadium, with the public invited to attend.

=== Brunei ===
The British High Commission held a photo exhibition for the jubilee.

With the consent of Sultan Hassanal Bolkiah, the Sultan Haji Omar Ali Saifuddien Bridge was lit up in red, white and blue in the Queen's honour.

== Commemorations outside the Commonwealth ==
US President Joe Biden and First Lady Jill Biden's message for the platinum jubilee weekend in June.

Several world leaders congratulated the Queen on her milestone, including French president Emmanuel Macron, German president Frank-Walter Steinmeier, Irish president Michael D. Higgins, Israeli president Isaac Herzog, King Abdullah II of Jordan, North Korean leader Kim Jong-un, King Salman of Saudi Arabia, and Queen Margrethe II of Denmark. The latter, who was celebrating her golden jubilee that year, also sent a letter to Elizabeth II to highlight the "unprecedented and remarkable achievement" and how it underlined the "importance of the Monarchy as a strong symbol of national identity and historic continuity in a rapidly changing modern world". A congratulatory message was also sent from former US president, Barack Obama.

Some world leaders provided gifts to the Queen to commemorate the milestone. Macron gifted the Queen several items including a ceremonial saddle, cavalry sabre, and a seven-year-old horse formerly with the French Republican Guard named Fabuleux de Maucourt. Azerbaijani president Ilham Aliyev gifted the Queen a Karabakh horse named "Shohret", and a sculpture of a Karabakh horse and a Dilbaz horse.

Several companies also released products to commemorate the jubilee. Italian luxury brand Bulgari unveiled the jubilee emerald garden high jewellery tiara, which can be worn either as a headpiece or as a necklace. The American toy manufacturer Mattel released a Barbie bearing the Queen's likeness. The Barbie is fitted with an elegant ivory gown and blue ribbon adorned with decorations of order.

=== Public celebrations ===
Several landmarks around the world were illuminated to commemorate the jubilee. On 2 June, buildings on the UK-facing coasts of Hauts-de-France were illuminated in red, blue and gold. Several Polish buildings were also illuminated in purple and white on that day, including the Palace of Culture and Science in Warsaw. On 4 June, the Empire State Building was illuminated in purple and gold.

Several jubilee concerts were also held in June. On 2 June, in the US, concerts were held at ʻIolani Palace in Honolulu and Governor's Palace in Colonial Williamsburg. Both musical performances also included the lighting of jubilee beacons, although the former in Honolulu also included aspects that highlighted of the relationship between the Hawaiian monarchs and the British royal family. On 5 June, several concerts were held in Rome, including one by the New Chamber Singers and the All Saints' Orchestra at All Saints' Anglican Church, and another swing concert by the "Smile Orchestra" big band. The former performed music from the Queen's coronation whereas the latter performed music from the Queen's youth. The concert was the subject of interviews by RAI and BBC.

Some private organisations also hosted jubilee dinners, including the Royal Commonwealth Society Hong Kong Branch on 1 June at the Hong Kong Club, and the Dubai-based Queen Elizabeth 2 on 3 and 4 June.

==== Commonwealth communities abroad ====
On 1 June, British and Canadian personnel of NATO's Allied Joint Force Command Brunssum took part in a parade to commemorate the platinum jubilee. The mayor of Brunssum served as the parade's guest of honour. Following the parade, British and Canadian communities hosted a jubilee street party in Brunssum, a tradition that dates back to the Queen's coronation in 1952.

The British Residents Association planned a series of events across Switzerland during June.

==== Initiatives by British diplomatic missions ====
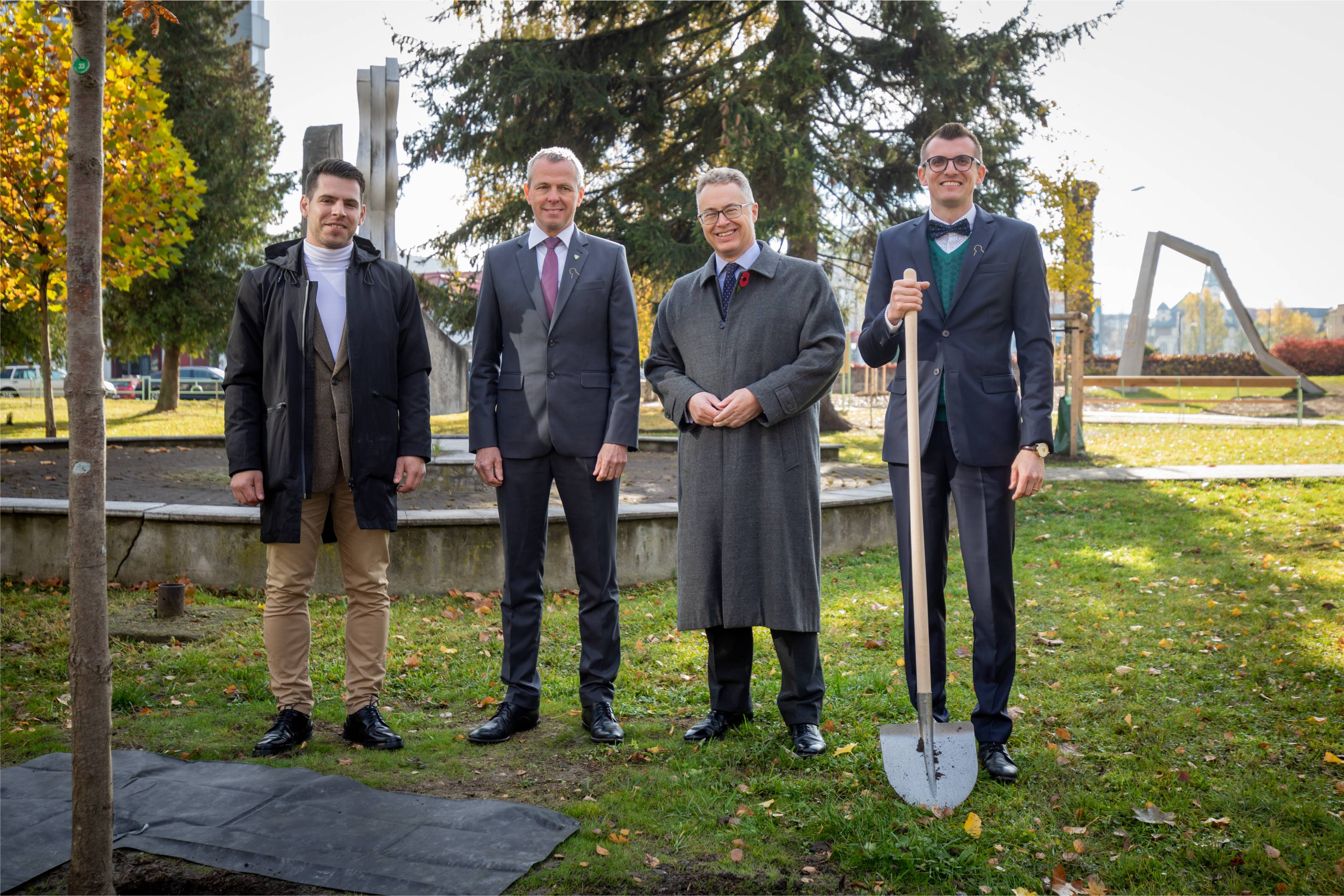
Ceremony participants

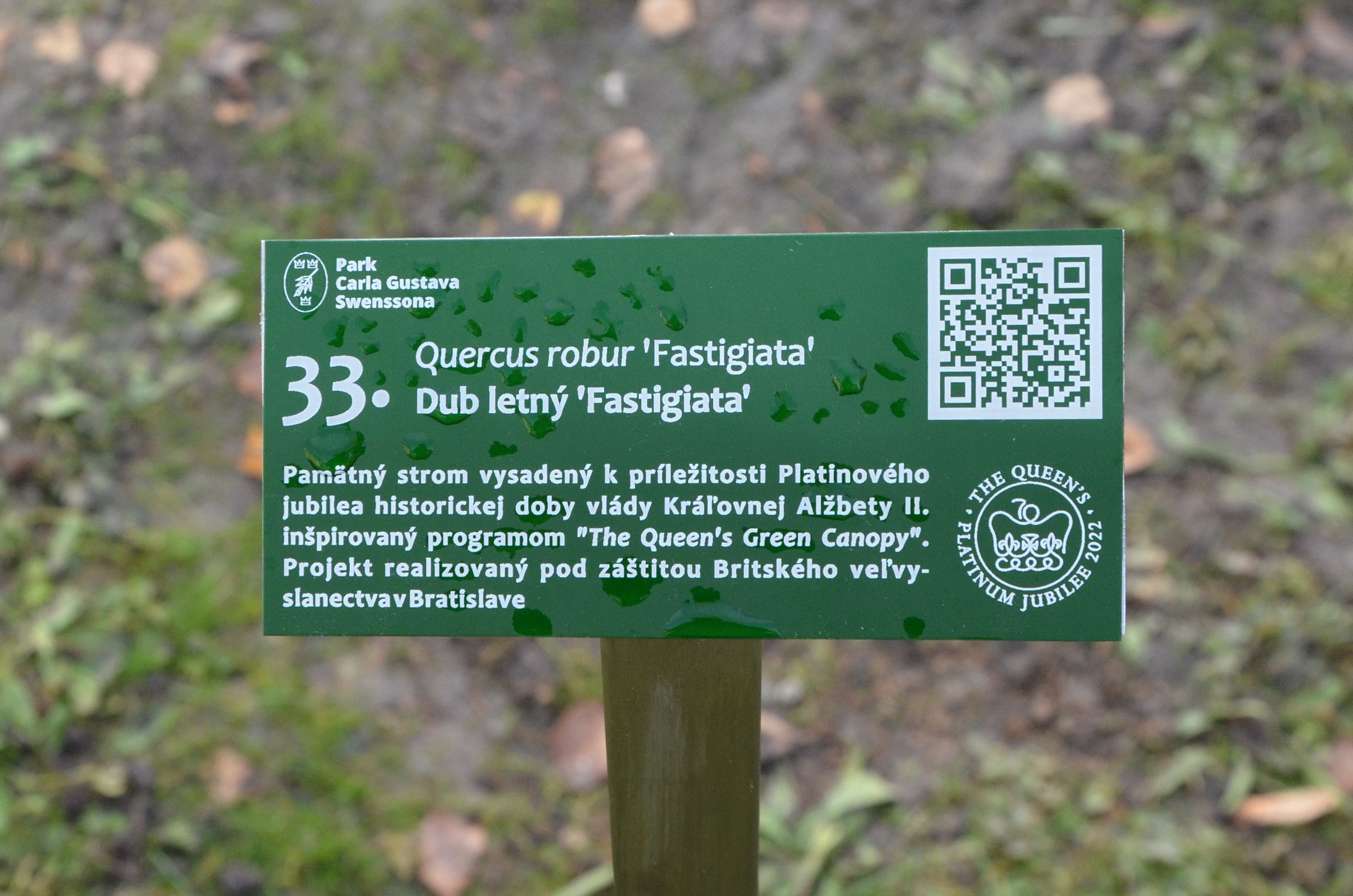
Plaque marking the ceremony

A tree planting ceremony commemorating the jubilee occurred in Žilina on 3 November 2021.

Tree planting ceremonies supported by British diplomatic missions took place in several countries as a part of The Queen's Green Canopy. On 3 October 2021, the Princess Royal planted a tree at the residence of the British Ambassador to France. On 3 November 2021, Nigel Baker, the British Ambassador to Slovakia, planted a tree at a local park in Žilina, Slovakia. The tree in Slovakia is twinned with a Prunus padus planted in Brookwood Cemetery in the UK, in commemoration of the UK's relationship with Slovakia and the Czech Republic.

On 18 February 2022, Margareta, Custodian of the Crown of Romania and Andrew Noble, the British Ambassador to Romania, unveiled a plaque at Săvârșin Castle to mark the weeping hornbeam planted for the jubilee. On 30 April 2022, the Cambodian government, in collaboration with the Kampot Provincial Administration, and the British Embassy in Phnom Penh, planted 1,000 mangrove trees in Kampot province. The British Embassy in Tokyo also planted a tree.

Several British embassies held arts and photo exhibitions. The British Embassy in Warsaw opened a photo exhibition along the side of Warsaw's largest park that featured images of the Queen meeting with Polish icons including Lech Wałęsa and Pope John Paul II. The British Embassy in Paris displayed a collection of 3-metre-high (9.8 ft) portraits of the Queen at the Ambassador's residence. The British Embassy in Baku displayed a carpet which uses traditional local weaving techniques to combine the English rose, Scottish thistle, Welsh daffodil, and Irish shamrock with Azerbaijan's national emblem, the pomegranate.

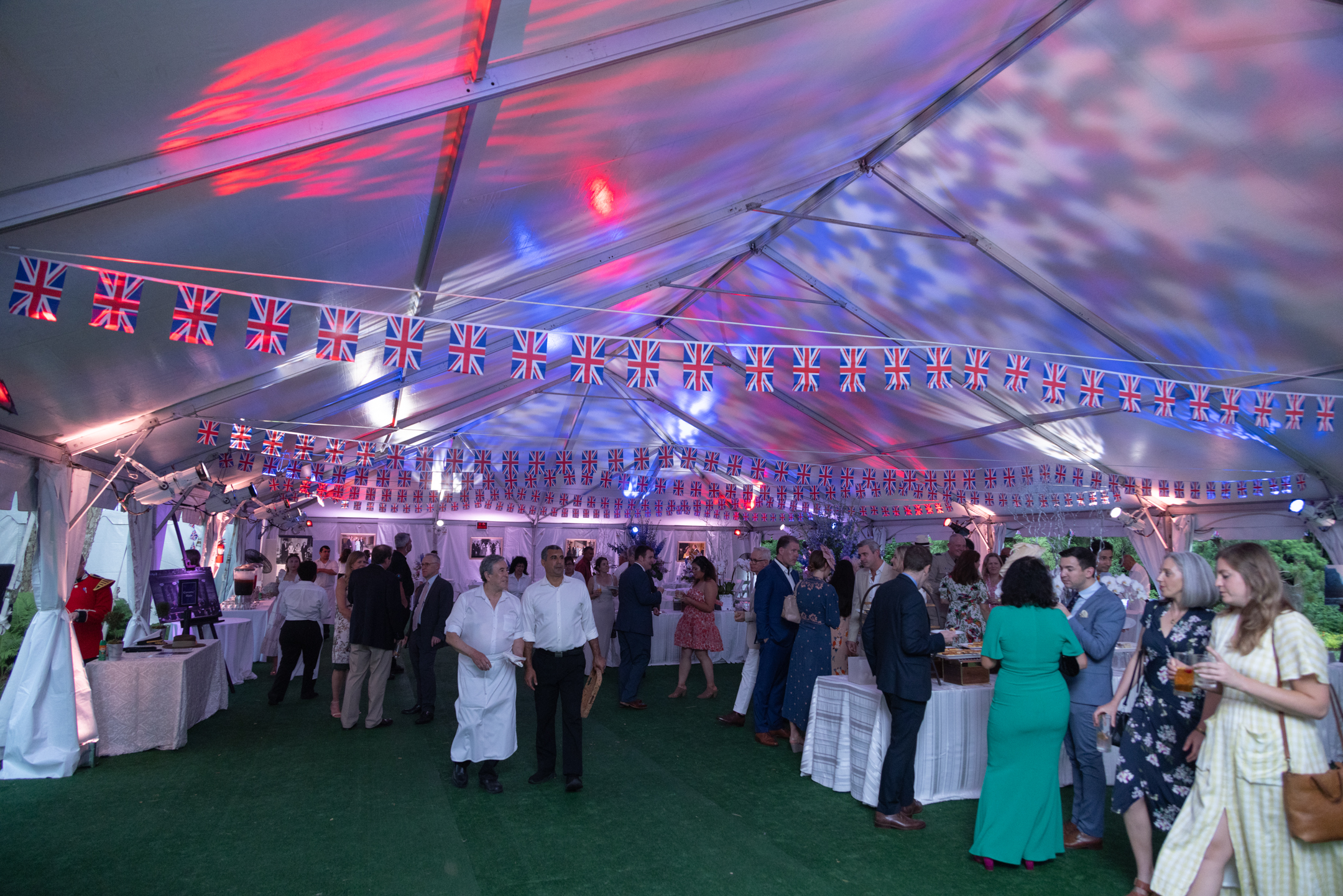
A commemorative event for the platinum jubilee at the British Embassy in Washington.

Several British embassies held a jubilee lunch or dinner. The British Embassy in Mexico City held a jubilee dinner and a photo exhibition for the reign of Elizabeth II. The British Embassy in Tokyo hosted a "Big Japan Jubilee Lunch", and also organised a "Platinum Jubilee Afternoon Tea and Cake Competition". Ten hotels from Tokyo and Osaka entered the competition, with the finalists announced at a Queen's Birthday Party event at the embassy on 16 June. The British Embassy in Montevideo launched "The Queen's Dessert" contest in which entrants made a dessert for afternoon tea or after the main course. The desserts were evaluated by the chef of the British chancery and three Uruguayan chefs, including Sergio Puglia. The British Embassy in Montevideo also hosted a dinner at its diplomatic residence, with several Uruguayan officials, including Vice-president Beatriz Argimón, foreign minister Francisco Bustillo, First Lady Lorena Ponce de León, and former President Luis Alberto Lacalle attending the dinner. The winning dish was served as dessert.

The British Embassy in Berne, in collaboration with World Radio Switzerland, asked people across Switzerland to nominate individuals who have made outstanding contributions to the lives of others within Switzerland for "The Platinum Champions Awards". The awardees were invited to the "Cheers for Volunteers" jubilee picnic, held at the Ambassador's Residence on 5 June. The embassy also organised a light display projected on four Bernese Alps, including the Eiger. It featured an image of the jubilee crown emblem and a silhouette of the Queen.

The British Embassy in Bangkok arranged for a celebratory digital message was beamed from the top of the Baiyoke Tower on 2 June.

==== France ====
On Accession Day, the French Embassy in the United Kingdom planted a "Royal Beauty" apple tree from Normandy to highlight the UK's historic ties with the region. Later that year in autumn, an alley of 70 hornbeams were planted at the British Normandy Memorial in Ver-sur-Mer, as a part of The Queen's Green Canopy initiative.

On 28 May, the Red Arrows took part in an aerial display over Le Touquet. Several days later, on 2 June, at the Arc de Triomphe, Macron participated in a flame rekindling ceremony to mark the jubilee. The anthem God Save the Queen was played by the Band of the Royal Regiment of Scotland, followed by La Marseillaise by the French Republican Guard Band. On 7 June, the Prince of Wales expressed the gratitude of the Royal Family to Macron for the "gestures of deep friendship" shown by France during the jubilee.

==== United States ====
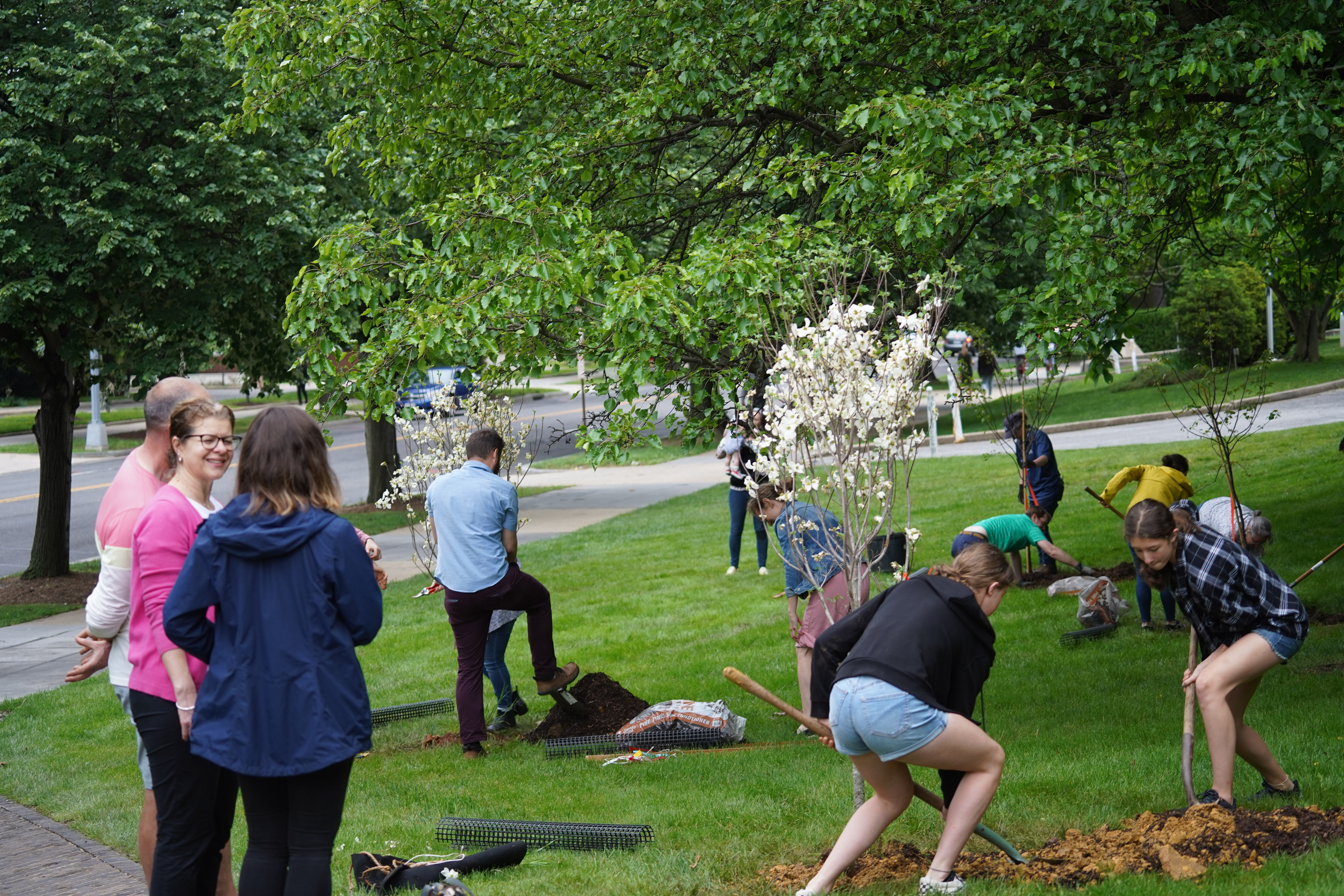
Families from the British Embassy, Washington, planting trees along Massachusetts Avenue to mark the jubilee, May 2022

A series of events celebrating the jubilee were held in Atlanta, Boston, Chicago, Houston, Los Angeles, Miami, Minneapolis, New York City, and San Francisco. From 2 June to 4 June, the Historical Society of Mt. Lebanon, Pennsylvania, held a toy soldier display of more than 500 pieces depicting the Trooping the Colour. A platinum jubilee evensong and reception took place on 5 June at Christ Church in Greenville, South Carolina.

== Jubilee visits ==
=== Akrotiri and Dhekelia ===
During their visit to the island of Cyprus from 20 to 22 June, the Earl and Countess of Wessex and Forfar spent time meeting British Armed Forces and their families based at the Sovereign Base Areas.

=== Antigua and Barbuda ===
The Earl and Countess of Wessex and Forfar visited Antigua and Barbuda in April. Ahead of the visit, the Antigua and Barbuda Reparations Support Commission penned an open letter criticising the royal family's past comments on slavery. During their visit on 25 April, the couple interacted with local craftspeople, creatives and community groups, and visited Sir Vivian Richards Stadium and the National Sailing Academy. At Government House, they presented platinum jubilee medals to three people to recognise their service to national security. During their meeting with Prime Minister Gaston Browne and his cabinet, Browne stated that the country would continue to have the Queen as head of state but said it aspires "at some point to become a republic". He also asked the couple to use their "diplomatic influence" to get "reparatory justice" for Antigua and Barbuda.

=== Australia ===
The Princess Royal, accompanied by her husband Vice Admiral Sir Timothy Laurence, toured Australia from 9 to 11 April. On the first day of her visit, she opened the 200th Sydney Royal Easter Show, which she first opened with her parents and brother Charles in 1970. She had last attended the event in 1988. She had an engagement as patron of the Royal Agricultural Society of the Commonwealth, before attending a dinner at the Sydney Olympic Park. The couple also met with representatives of the New South Wales Rural Fire Service, the Royal Australian Corps of Signals and Royal Australian Corps of Transport.

=== Bahamas ===
External videos
- The Bahamas welcomes The Duke & Duchess of Cambridge on the occasion of The Queen's Platinum Jubilee; Source: The Office of the Prime Minister The Bahamas.

Prince William, Duke of Cambridge, and his wife, Catherine, Duchess of Cambridge, toured The Bahamas from 24 to 26 March. They spent time with communities across the island, attending a junkanoo parade and The Bahamas Platinum Jubilee Sailing Regatta at Montagu foreshore, visiting Sybil Strachan Primary School and meeting healthcare workers in the Garden of Remembrance.

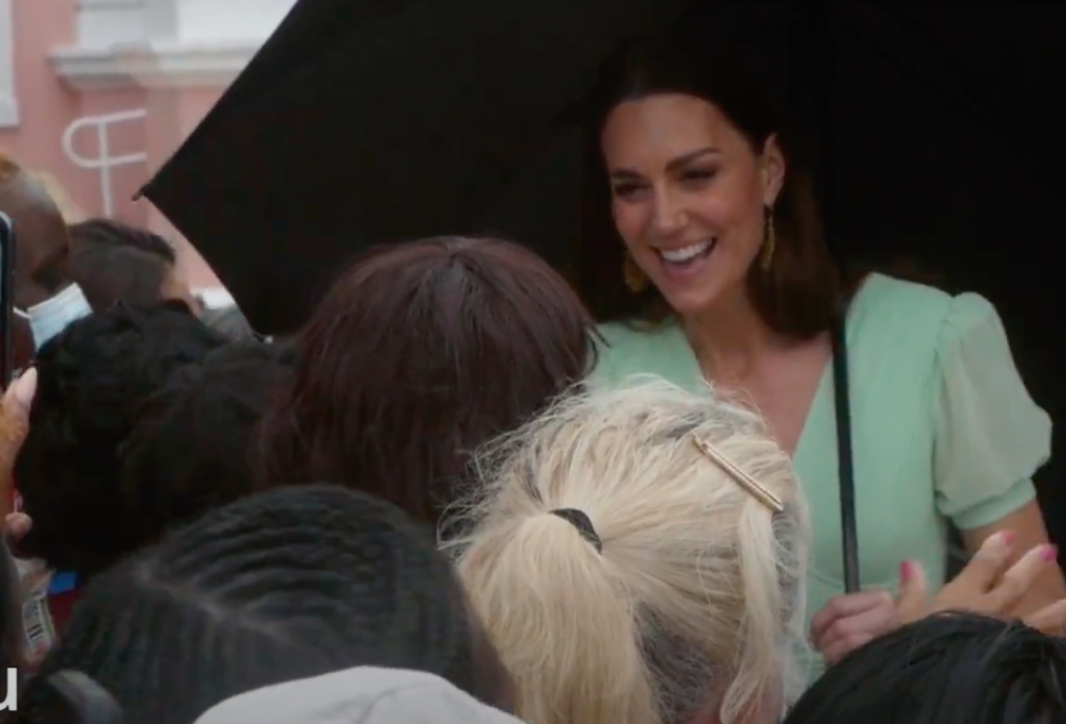
The Duchess of Cambridge meeting Bahamians during a walkabout in downtown Nassau

Though the Duke and Duchess toured the country as representatives of the Bahamian monarch, at the request of the government of The Bahamas, the Bahamas National Reparations Committee still penned an open letter ahead of the royal tour, asking for reparations from the United Kingdom for slavery. In the evening of 25 March, the couple attended a reception hosted by the Queen's representative, Governor-General Sir Cornelius A. Smith, at the Baha Mar Resort on Cable Beach in Nassau. In his speech, the Duke said, "I am delighted to convey to you a message of good wishes from my grandmother, the Queen of The Bahamas, on the occasion of her platinum jubilee." He went on to assure the Caribbean nations that the monarchy would "support with pride and respect your decisions about your future. Relationships evolve. Friendship endures".

=== Belize ===
The Duke and Duchess of Cambridge visited from 19 to 22 March. They visited the Mayan site of Caracol, explored Belize's Maya chocolate making, and met the Garifuna community in Hopkins. They also learned about the restoration of Belize's barrier reef, and scuba-dived there. A planned visit to the Akte 'il Ha cacao farm in Indian Creek was scrapped due to residents' protests over lack of consultation about the local football pitch earmarked for the couple's helicopter landing as well as an ongoing dispute over land with Fauna and Flora International, of which the Duke is a patron.

In the evening of 21 March, Governor-General Dame Froyla Tzalam hosted a reception at the Mayan ruins at Cahal Pech.

=== Canada ===
The Prince of Wales, heir apparent to the Canadian throne, and his wife, the Duchess of Cornwall, undertook a three-day tour of Canada as part of the jubilee celebrations. Beginning in St John's on 17 May, the royal couple participated in a moment of reflection and prayer with indigenous leaders and community members at the Heart Garden and unveiled a 1 km Platinum Jubilee Walkway on the grounds of Government House connecting 54 trees planted by members of the Canadian royal family (including Their Royal Highnesses that day) and viceregal representatives and is planned to open in September. The following day, Charles and Camilla were in Ottawa, where the Prince was invested by the Governor General into the Order of Military Merit as an Extraordinary Commander. The couple later participated in a wreath-laying ceremony at the National War Memorial and met with Canadian-Ukrainian organisations before the Prince of Wales discussed employment and sustainability with participants of The Prince's Trust Canada. In the evening, the Governor General hosted a reception at Rideau Hall. RoseAnne Archibald, National Chief of the Assembly of First Nations, said that Charles acknowledged failures by Canadian governments in handling the relationship between the Crown and indigenous people, which she said "really meant something". The couple arrived on 19 May in Yellowknife and Dettah. In the latter, they visited a Dene First Nation community and the Prince held discussions with local chiefs and elders, as well as met local food producers at the Prince of Wales Northern Heritage Centre. The Duchess visited Kaw Tay Whee School and a YWCA transitional housing centre for women and their children. Later, the Prince and the Duchess visited the Ceremonial Circle for a platinum jubilee flag raising and the unveiling of a plaque.

In June, the government of Canada announced official donations on behalf of the royal couple to mark their jubilee tour. The government announced contributions of CA$15,000 to Conservation Corps Newfoundland and Labrador, CA$15,000 to Start2Finish Canada, CA$15,000 to Aboriginal Sport Circle of the Northwest Territories, and CA$25,000 to United Way Northwest Territories. The Premier of Newfoundland and Labrador, Andrew Furey, announced a $10,000 legacy gift to the East Coast Trail Association in commemoration of the royal tour.

=== Cyprus ===
From 20 to 22 June 2022, the Earl and Countess of Wessex and Forfar visited Cyprus. They were received by President Nicos Anastasiades, and attended a reception hosted by the British High Commissioner to Cyprus to mark the jubilee. Highlights of the tour included a reception at the Presidential Palace and a visit to the UN Buffer Zone in Cyprus to recognise the UK's contributions to UNFICYP. The Countess met women and young people and learned about their contributions in Cyprus by being a member of projects such as the Women Mediators Across the Commonwealth network or the UN and British Council 'Young Leaders in Action' programme. The Earl met students who had taken part in the Duke of Edinburgh's Award.

=== Gibraltar ===
External videos
- Royal visit to Gibraltar for Platinum Jubilee; Source: Gibraltar Chronicle.

The Earl and Countess of Wessex and Forfar visited Gibraltar from 7 to 9 June. Upon their arrival, the couple were greeted by Sir David Steel, the governor, and Fabian Picardo, the chief minister and received a military welcome by a Guard of Honour formed of the Royal Gibraltar Regiment. They also met with volunteers from various charities and held audiences with the Duke of Edinburgh's International Award participants. Among other places visited by the couple were the Moorish Castle Estate, the University of Gibraltar, and Sandy Bay. The trip also featured a special Queen's Birthday Parade near Grand Casemates Square on 9 June.

=== Grenada ===
The Earl and Countess of Wessex and Forfar were set to visit Grenada in April. However, after talks with the island's government and governor general, the tour was postponed and the couple expressed their hopes to visit the country on a later date. It was reported that representatives of Grenada's National Reparations Committee had planned to meet the couple and discuss Britain and the royal family's past links to slavery in the region.

=== Guernsey ===
The Earl and Countess of Wessex and Forfar visited Guernsey, Alderney and Sark, from 9 to 10 May, to mark Liberation Day as well as the jubilee. They first visited the Liberation Tea Dance at Beau Séjour, and later travelled to Castle Cornet for an Ecumenical Service, and delivered a message from the Queen, before watching a special performance of 'Sarnia Cherie' by the Guernsey Music Service Youth Choir. They later watched the Liberation Day Cavalcade as it travelled around the Model Yacht Pond. The next day, they visited Forest Primary School in Guernsey, to see preparations for their celebrations, where they also met the winner of the Guernsey platinum jubilee flag competition. In Alderney, they visited Victoria Street, St Anne, and the Alderney Wildlife Trust (AWT). At Island Hall, they attended a reception, and later at the Roman Fort heritage site at Longis, they formally broke ground for the forthcoming platinum jubilee Archaeological Dig. They later boarded the Channel Islands' only train service, at the Arsenal. In Sark, they presented emergency service personnel with Platinum Jubilee medals, and also met Sark's occupation generation in the Island Hall, where the Earl presented a message from the Queen.

=== Ireland ===
The Prince of Wales and the Duchess of Cornwall visited the Republic of Ireland from 24 to 25 March. In County Waterford, the couple visited Waterford city centre, met with members of the Ukrainian community, toured a selection of museums and learned about the history of Reginald's Tower. In County Tipperary, they toured a farmers market in Cahir, and visited Cahir Castle and the Rock of Cashel.

=== Jamaica ===
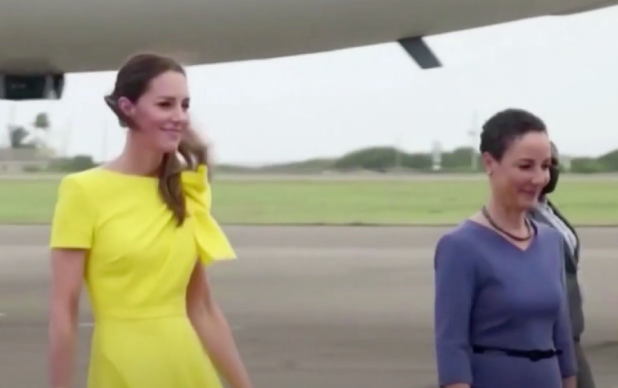
The Duchess of Cambridge (left) arriving at Norman Manley International Airport in Kingston, during the Platinum Jubilee tour of Jamaica

The Duke and Duchess of Cambridge toured Jamaica from 22 to 24 March, on behalf of the Queen of Jamaica. They joined young football players in Trench Town and celebrated the legacy of Bob Marley and other Jamaican musicians. At the Shortwood Teachers' College, they met students training to become early childhood education practitioners. At Spanish Town Hospital, they met frontline workers and, later, interacted with members of the Jamaica Defence Force at Flankers, near Montego Bay. A demonstration by the Advocates Network, a human rights coalition of Jamaican activists and equalities organisations, took place near the British High Commission in Kingston to ask for an apology and compensation from the Crown for chattel slavery.

The Duke and Duchess were received by the Prime Minister, Andrew Holness. At the dinner hosted by the Governor-General at King's House, the Duke expressed his "profound sorrow" over slavery, adding that it "should never have happened" and "forever stains our history".

On their final day in Jamaica, the couple attended the inaugural Commissioning Parade for service personnel from across the Caribbean who had recently completed the Caribbean Military Academy's Officer Training Programme. The tour was estimated to have cost JMD $8 million.

=== Jersey ===
The Earl and Countess of Wessex and Forfar visited Jersey from 8 to 9 May to mark Liberation Day as well as the jubilee. At Government House in St Saviour, the Earl and Countess met members of the community and members of the Commonwealth Games Association Jersey, The Duke of Edinburgh's Award in Jersey and Jersey Mencap. To commemorate the platinum jubilee, the couple unveiled the Le temps s'passes vite Platinum Jubilee Sundial. Later, at the Royal Jersey Agricultural and Horticultural Society, the couple saw items related to the German Occupation. The next day, the couple unveiled a plaque on Jersey's new official saluting gun battery in memory of Prince Philip, Duke of Edinburgh. At the Liberation Day event, the Earl read a message from the Queen. The couple then met members of the 'occupation generation'. The Earl and Countess later viewed the Liberation Day March Past, which comprised marching bands, serving military units, veterans and youth organisations.

=== Papua New Guinea ===
The Princess Royal visited the country from 11 to 13 April. She and her husband Vice Admiral Sir Timothy Laurence were greeted by Prime Minister James Marape upon their arrival, who also hosted a dinner for the couple on the last day of their tour. Among their engagements were visits to a Catholic boarding school, St John Ambulance PNG, the Bomana War Cemetery, Papua New Guinea National Museum and Art Gallery, Port Moresby General Hospital, Vabukori, and Hanuabada.

During the Princess's visit, the Minister for National Events, Justin Tkatchenko, said that the country won't make a transition to a republic, and Papua New Guinea is embracing its monarchy and "making it bigger and better than it was before".

=== Saint Lucia ===
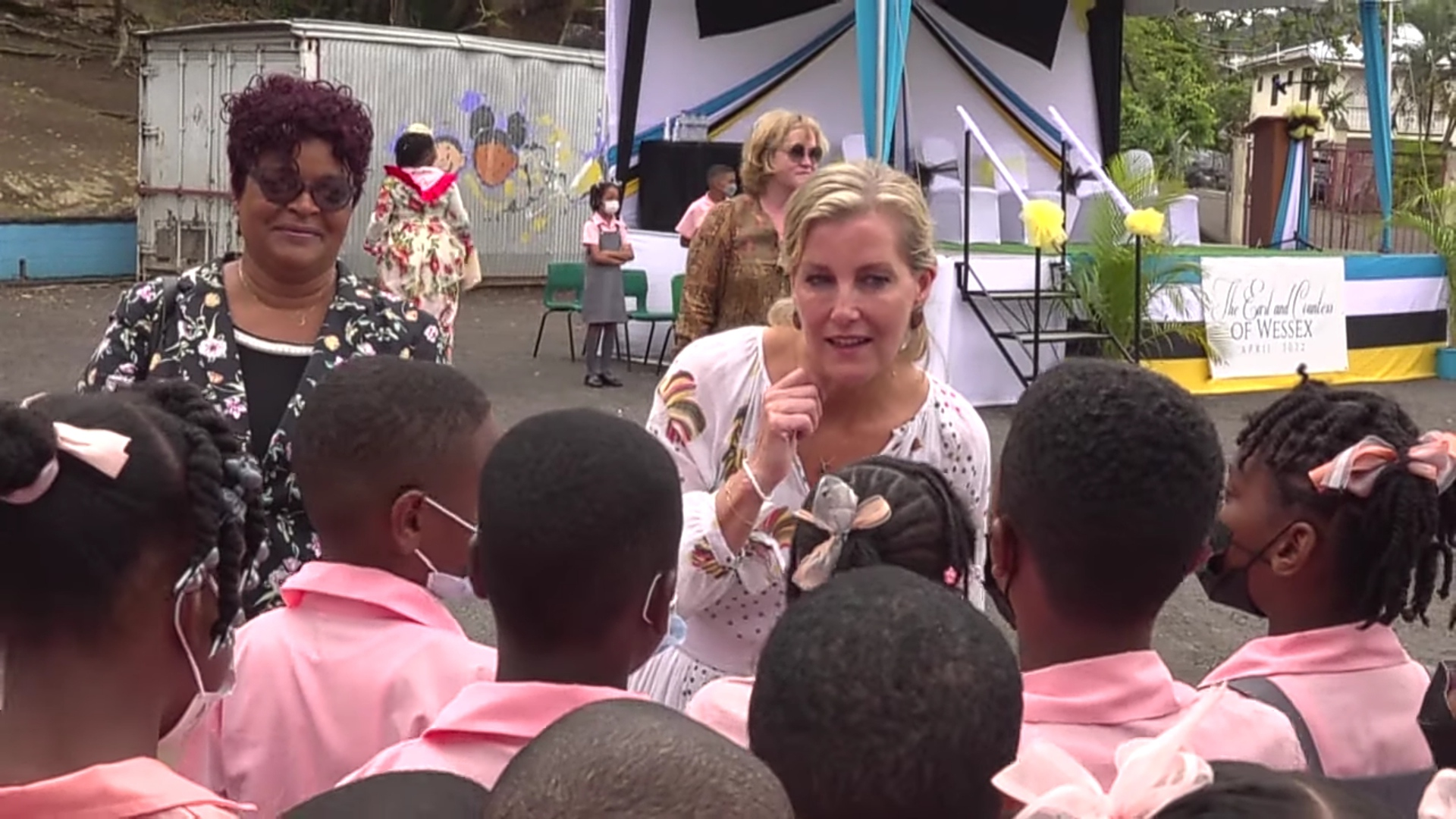
The Countess of Wessex and Forfar meeting schoolchildren during her Platinum Jubilee Tour of Saint Lucia

The Earl and Countess of Wessex and Forfar arrived in Saint Lucia on 22 April. They met Prime Minister Philip J. Pierre, and acting Governor-General Errol Charles. On 24 April, they attended a jubilee church service and visited Morne Fortune. On 27 April, they met locals in Soufrière. They also toured a cocoa plantation and met representatives of female-led businesses before visiting Sulphur Springs and having lunch with the prime minister. They also watched a performance by young people at the Mini Stadium. On 28 April, they wrapped up their tour by meeting pupils from six separate Saint Lucian schools.

=== Saint Vincent and the Grenadines ===
The Earl and Countess of Wessex and Forfar visited Saint Vincent and the Grenadines on 23 April. They were greeted by Governor-General Dame Susan Dougan and Deputy Prime Minister Montgomery Daniel. The Countess met members of the La Gracia Dance Company and representatives from two local organisations that assist blind and partially sighted people. The Earl met athletes who would take part in the 2022 Commonwealth Games. The couple also visited the Saint Vincent and the Grenadines Botanic Gardens, where they planted a tree. During the visit, a small group gathered outside the Government House to protest the visit.

== Online significance ==
In May 2022, jubilee-themed emojis and stickers were released on social media, including Twitter and Instagram.

Research into Google Search's trend data found that the UK, US, Canada, and Australia were the global hotspots for the word "Jubilee" from 2 June to 5 June. During the jubilee central weekend, Canada saw 227,000 searches for the word jubilee on Google, while over 200,000 were recorded in Australia. In the US, a total of 1.9 million searches for the word jubilee were made on Google.

The British slang abbreviation "Platty Joobs", coined by comedian Kiell Smith-Bynoe, also became a trend online for the Platinum Jubilee.

== Death of the Queen ==
On 8 September 2022, a few months after celebrating her Platinum Jubilee in the summer, the Queen died at Balmoral Castle in Scotland, aged 96. At the time of her death, the Queen had reigned for 70 years and 214 days, the longest of any monarch in British history. Her reign is the longest verifiable reign of any female sovereign, and is only second to that of Louis XIV.

== See also ==
- 2022 in the United Kingdom
- 2022 in Canada
- 2022 in Australia
- 2022 in New Zealand
- 2022 in Jamaica
- 2022 in Belize
- Silver Jubilee of Elizabeth II
- Ruby Jubilee of Elizabeth II
- Golden Jubilee of Elizabeth II
- Diamond Jubilee of Elizabeth II
- Sapphire Jubilee of Elizabeth II
- Death and state funeral of Elizabeth II
- History of monarchy in Australia
- History of monarchy in Canada
- List of monarchs in Britain by length of reign
- List of jubilees of British monarchs
