= National Workers Memorial (Australia) =

Coordinates: 35.2981°S 149.1448°E

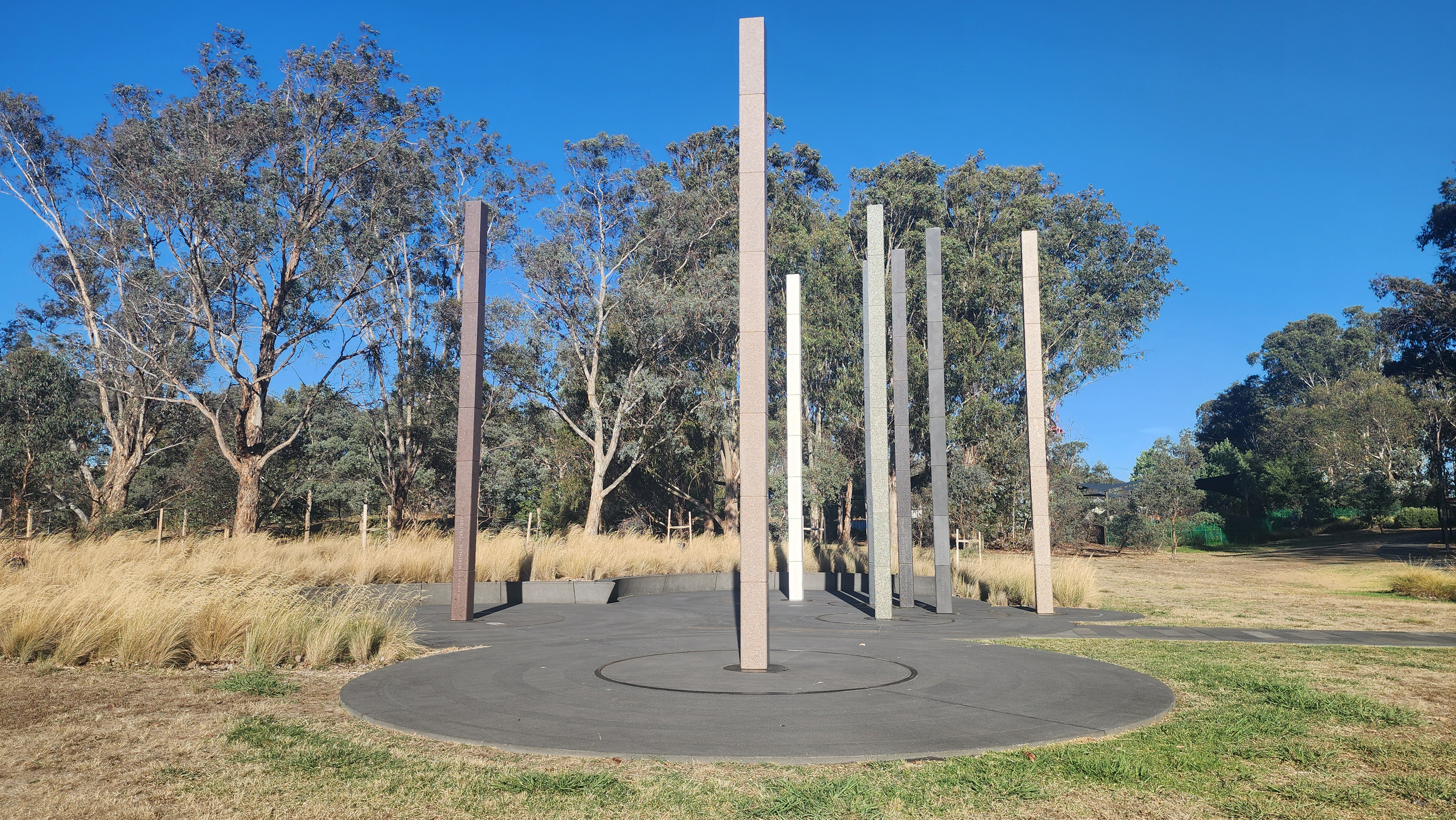
The National Workers Memorial in 2026

The National Workers Memorial in the national capital, Canberra, Australian Capital Territory, is Australia's place for honouring workers who have died as a result of work-related accidents, incidents and disease.

== Purpose ==
In May 2011, the Australian Government provided funding for the design and construction of a memorial "to honour and pay tribute to working Australians who have died as a result of work-related accidents, incidents and disease". The other stated purposes are:

- To serve "as a poignant reminder of the importance of work health and safety and the need for a determined and continued effort by all to prevent work-related accidents and disease. It is also a place to reflect on the evolving values, ideas and aspirations of the Australian community in relation to work health and safety."
- To provide "a place for visitors to lay a tribute for a loved one, a location to pause and reflect within earshot of the National Carillon’s bells, as well as allowing a space for congregation, interaction and ceremony."
- To provide "an important focal point for the national commemoration of Workers Memorial Day, recognised internationally on 28 April each year."

Workplace deaths amount to around 300 per year in Australia.

== Site ==
The site in Canberra is within the sound of the bells of the National Carillon, in Kings Park, Canberra, beside Lake Burley Griffin. The other memorials nearby are:

- National Police Memorial
- HMAS Canberra (D33)

The memorial has been sanctioned by the National Capital Authority as the memorial is within the Parliamentary Triangle of Canberra.

== Structure ==
The memorial consists of eight tall stone poles, symbolically sighted across a stylised map of Australia in the places of the state and territory capital cities. Architectural firm Johnson Pilton Walker has placed concentric circles around the poles with words representing the intended outcome of knowledge and application of good practices of work health and safety.

The lead-in path has two inscriptions along its edge, saying:

- every worker has the right to return home
- every workplace death diminishes us as a nation

Construction is reported to have cost A$3 million.

== Inauguration ceremony ==
The inauguration ceremony was held on Sunday 28 April 2013.

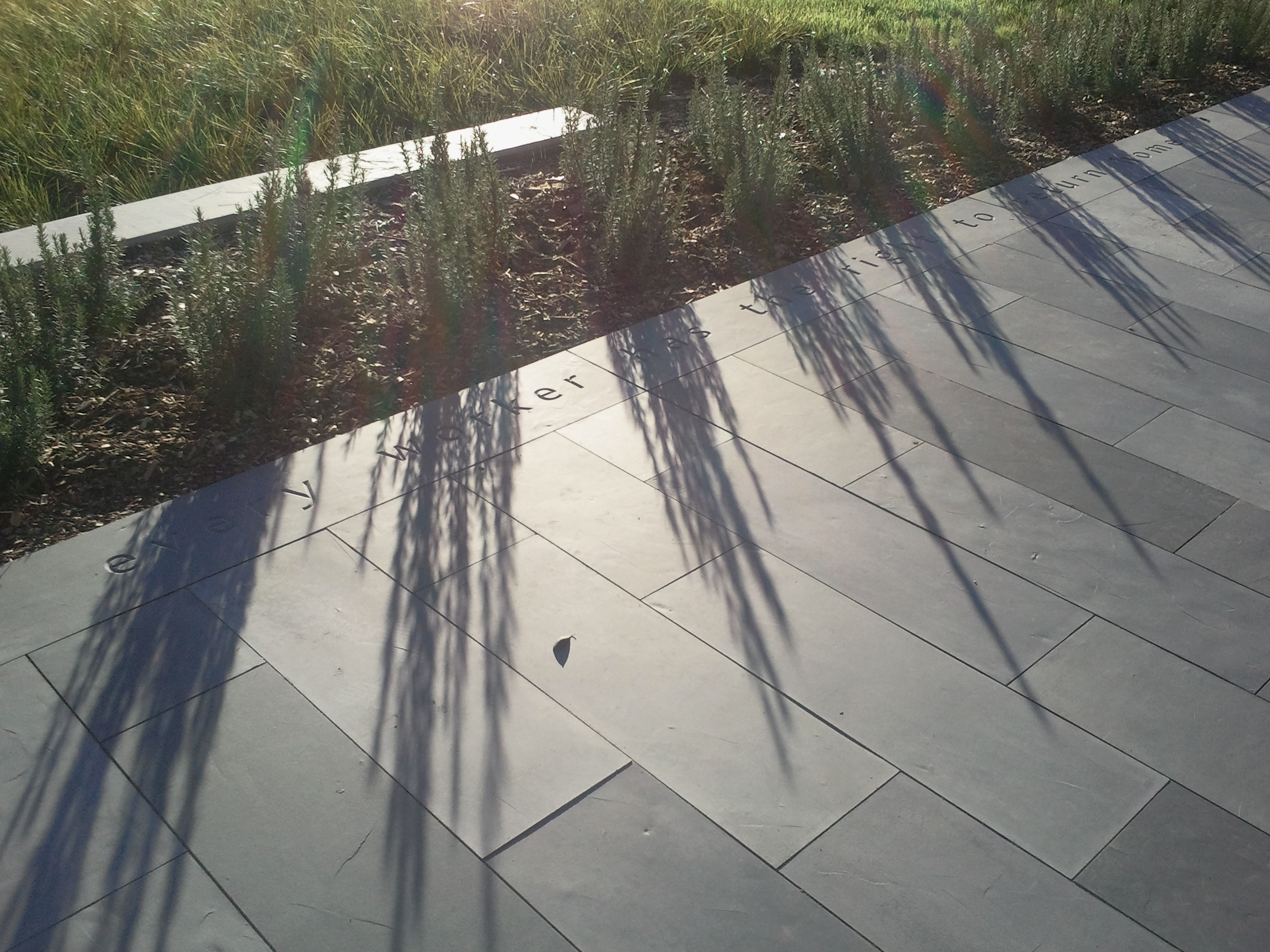
"every worker has the right to return home"

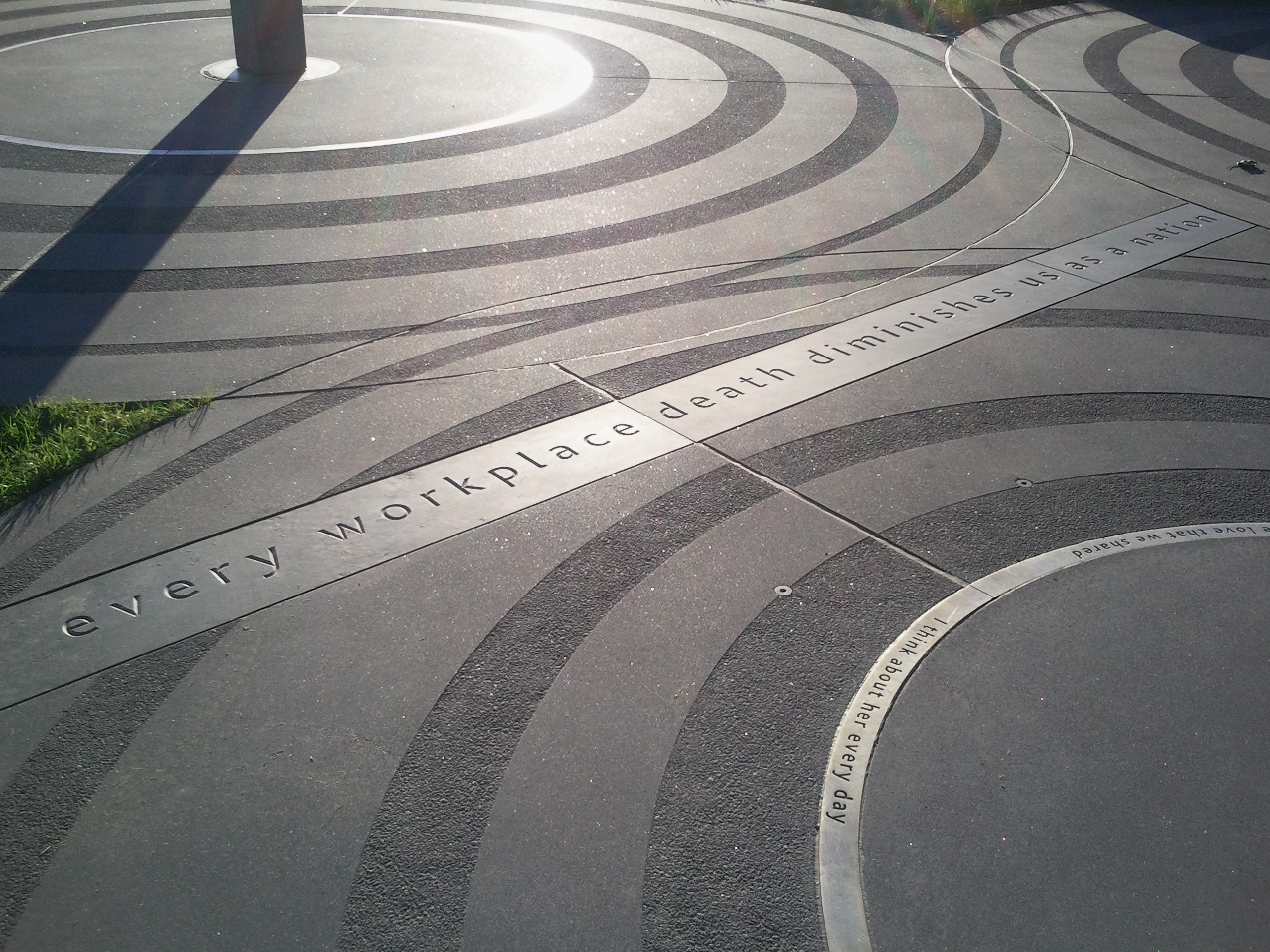
"every workplace death diminishes us as a nation" and "I think about her every day"

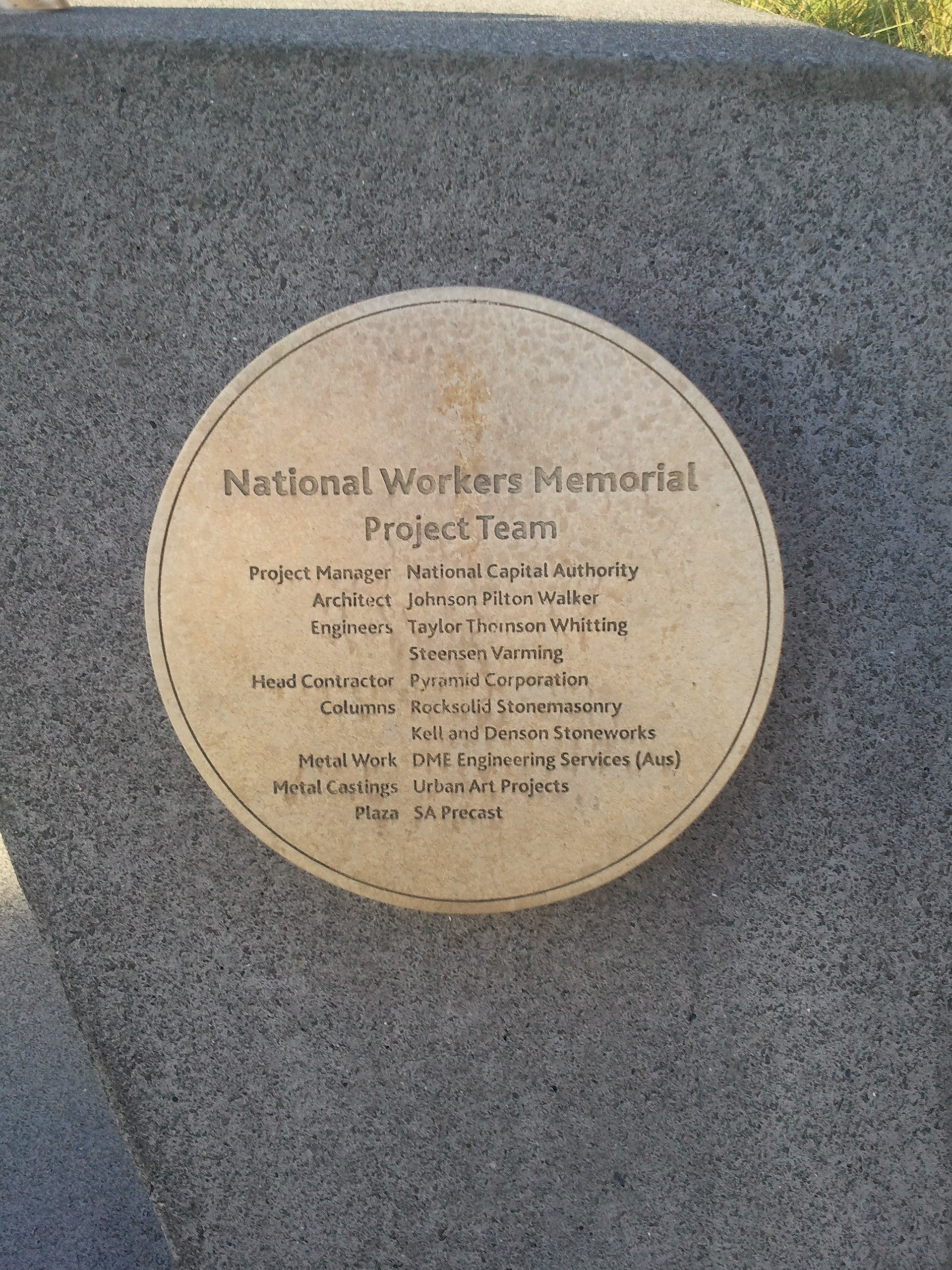
Plaque

== See also ==
- National Workers Memorial - United States (Silver Spring, Maryland)
- The Muster Point
