= Kings Park, Canberra =

Park in Canberra, Australia

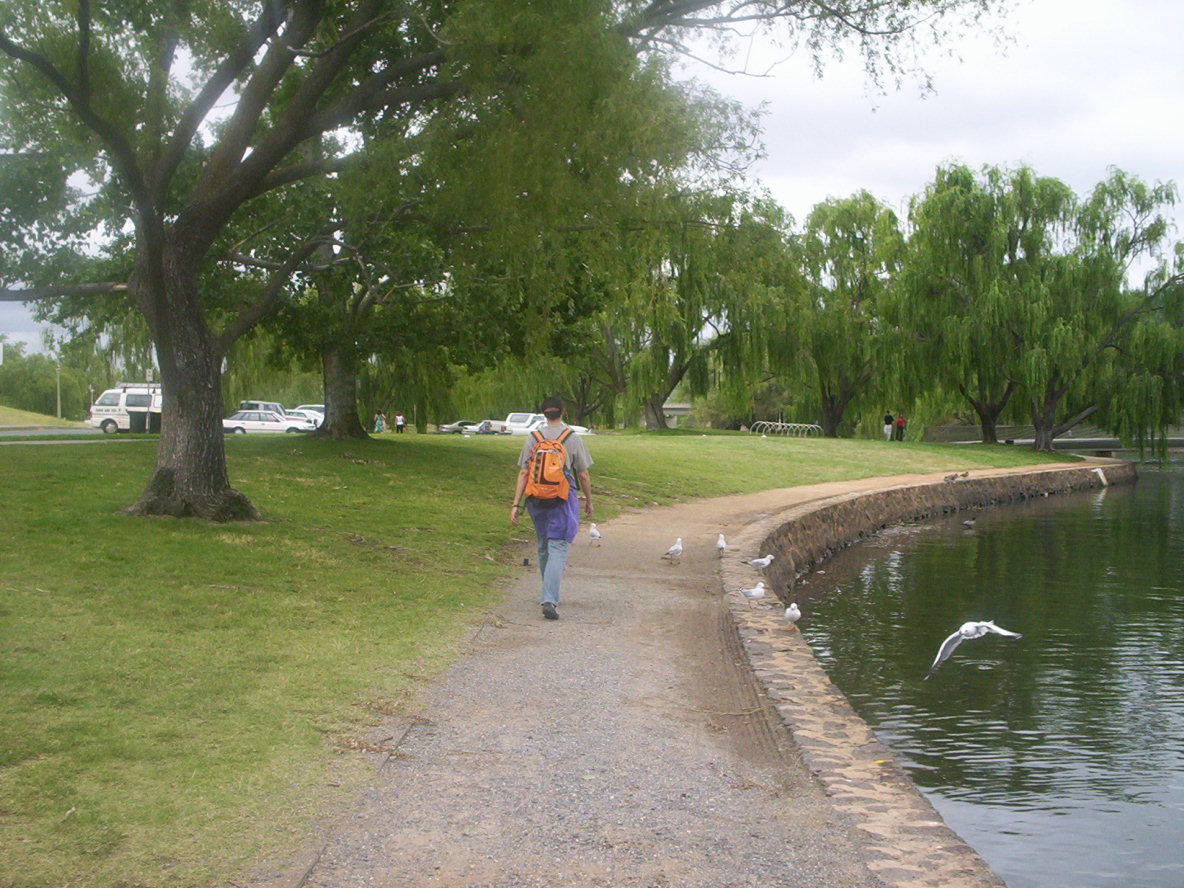
- Kings Park by the shore of Lake Burley Griffin
- Interactive map of Kings Park, Canberra
- Location: Parkes, Australian Capital Territory
- Coordinates: 35°17′52″S 149°8′42″E
- Manager: National Capital Authority

Kings Park is a park in Canberra, Australia on the shore of Lake Burley Griffin.

Kings Park is adjacent to Kings Avenue, on the north side of Lake Burley Griffin's Central Basin. The park has a number of community and heritage spaces located within it. Kings Park is located adjacent to Commonwealth Park, which lies to its west, with the two parks separated by a red gravel assembly area at the base of Anzac Parade. The area is federally owned, and cared for by the National Capital Authority.

Blundells Cottage is located within the Kings Park precinct, having been constructed before the parkland was developed.

Several spaces designed for community engagement and enjoyment exist within the Park. The National Carillon, which conducts regular free musical programs, is located on Queen Elizabeth II Island, just off the shore of Kings Park. Boundless, a children's play ground designed to allow easier access for people with disabilities, is located closely to the Police and Workers Memorials.

== Memorial spaces ==
Kings Park is home to a number of public memorial spaces including the National Police Memorial, National Workers Memorial, National Emergency Services Memorial, Australian Merchant Navy Memorial, Indian Ocean Tsunami Memorial and the HMAS Canberra Memorial.

The lake edge includes part of the R G Menzies Walk. The memorial walk is dedicated to Robert Menzies, Australia's 12th Prime Minister. The memorial walk stretches along the northern shore of Lake Burley Griffin, between the Commonwealth and Kings Bridge.

== Boundless Playground ==
Installed for the Centenary of Canberra in 2013, Boundless Playground is designed as an all ability play space for families. The play ground includes multiple pieces of play equipment that can accommodate children with "vision, hearing and mobility impairments, as well as children with spectrum disorders."
