= Cameron Chisholm Nicol =

Australian architecture firm with offices in Perth and Brisbane

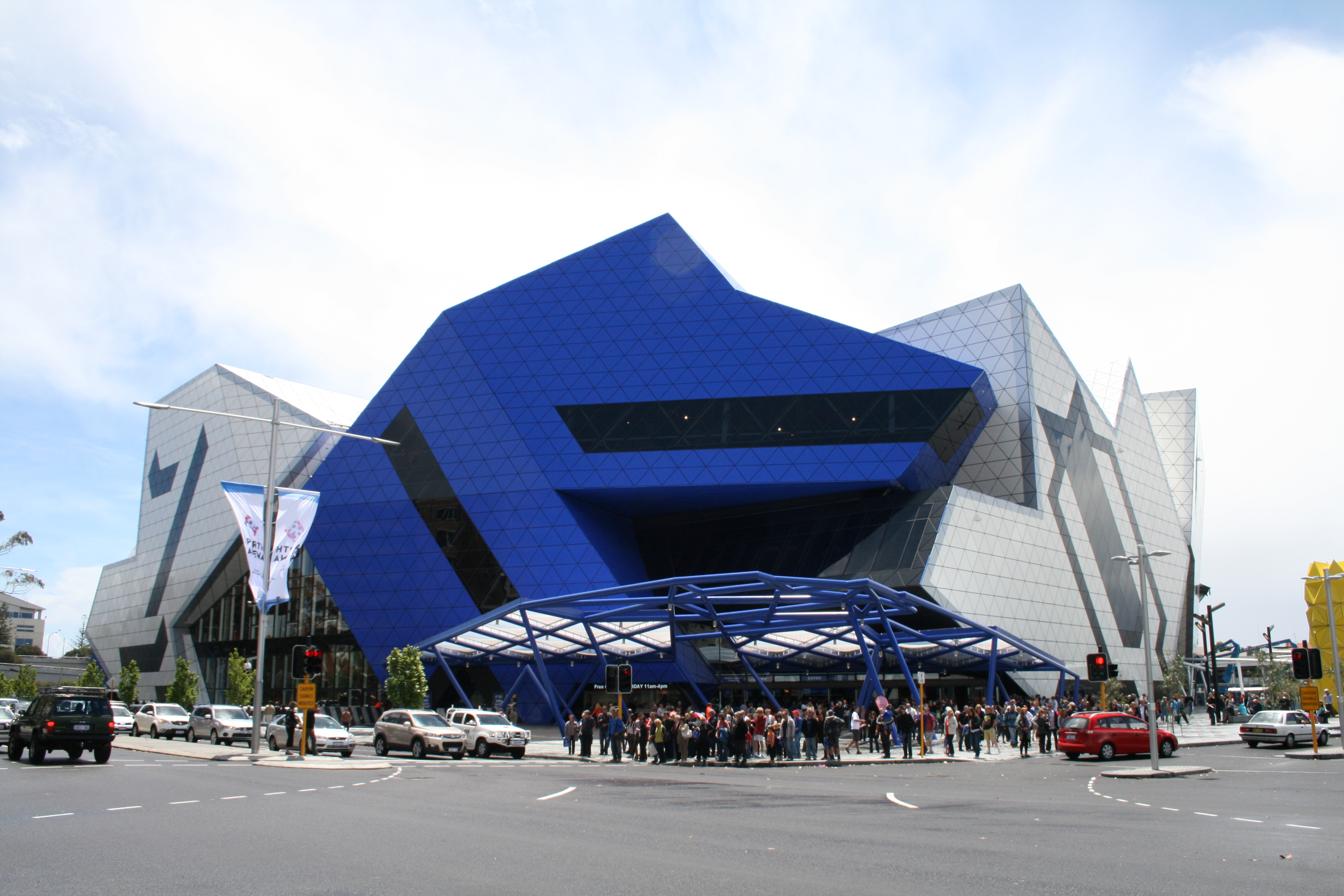
Perth Arena, November 2012

Cameron Chisholm Nicol (CCN) is an Australian multi-disciplinary architecture practice. Established in Perth in 1884 by James William Wright, the firm has operated continuously in Western Australia since that time. The Brisbane office was opened in 1986. The two offices are no longer linked, and operate as separate entities.

== History ==
In 1884, James William Wright opened a private architectural practice in Perth, Western Australia, which was the only one in the colony at the time. He had arrived in the colony three years earlier, from South Australia, and had completed government contracts for engineering projects in both colonies. The first commission for the new firm, known as J. W. Wright & Co., was Woodbridge House, which Charles Harper had built on the Swan River near Guildford. It designed a wide range of buildings over the following decades, including office buildings, hotels, banks, grandstands, and the York Town Hall. In 1906, Wright accepted two of his former apprentices as partners, and the firm became known as Wright, Powell & Cameron. Wright's name was dropped after his death in 1917, and the company was known as just Powell & Cameron until 1930, when Oswald Chisholm became a partner and the firm's name was changed to Powell, Cameron & Chisholm.

In the 1950s, Oswald Chisholm's son Ross began work in the practice, working with Gil Nicol. Ross Chisholm became a partner in the practice in 1958.

In 1986, managing director Henry Peel established an office in Brisbane operating under the name CCN Group (QLD) Pty Ltd. Designs for which it has been commissioned include The Australian Chancery and Ambassadors residence in Brasilia. The company's architects acted as key consultants to the Urban Development Authority in Malaysia. CCN Group has designed projects internationally in China, Hong Kong, India, Italy, Iran, Jakarta, Japan, Malaysia and Yemen.

In 2018, the directors of the Perth office are Dominic Snellgrove (managing director), Gavin Broom (practice manager), Keat Tan (design director) and Peter Keleman.

== Notable projects ==
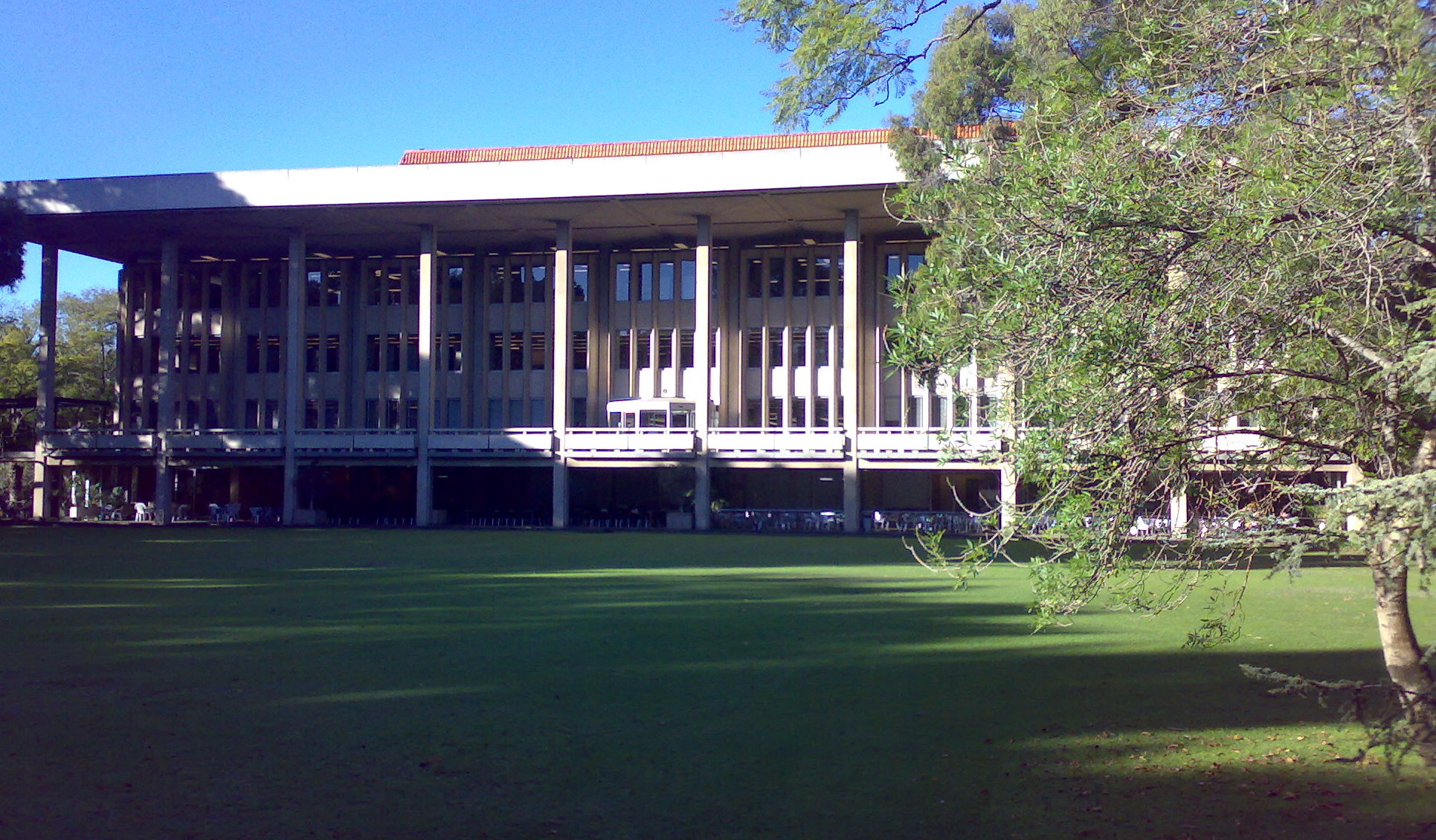
Reid Library at the University of Western Australia

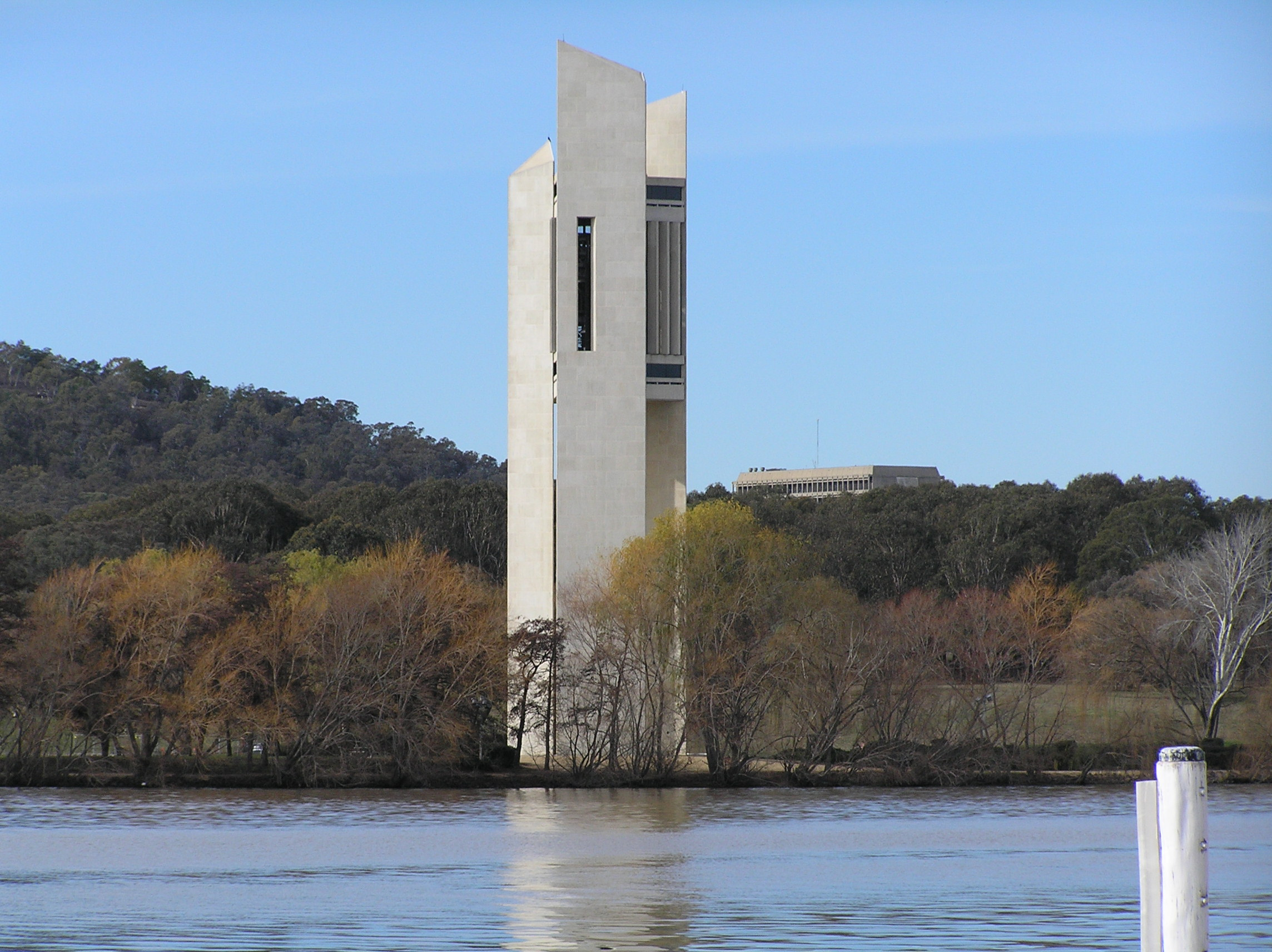
National Carillon, Canberra

The firm's first commission building was Woodbridge House in Guildford in 1885. Since that time the firm has designed many structures. Some of the better known projects are:

The Reid Library, at the University of Western Australia, was awarded a RIBA Gold Medal in 1964. Gil Nicol was the leading architect on the project, as he was for many Perth buildings, including the Alexander Library, Wesfarmers Building and the Metropolitan Water Centre.

In 1970 the firm designed the award-winning National Carillon tower in Canberra, which was a gift to Australia from Britain and was constructed on Queen Elizabeth II Island in Lake Burley Griffin.

Allendale Square in Perth was designed by Cameron Chisholm Nicol in 1970 and was completed in 1976. The building has been celebrated with awards including the RAIA (WA Chapter) Architecture Design Award and Bronze Medal Award as well as the ACI Energy Conservation Award and Alcoa of Australia Award for Architecture. In 2018 Allendale Square received the WA Architecture Awards Richard Roach Jewel Award for Enduring Architecture.

In 2012, Cameron Chisholm Nicol in joint venture with ARM Architecture completed the Perth Arena. The Arena received Australia's most prestigious architecture award, the Sir Zelman Cowen Award for Public Architecture, at the AIA National Architecture Awards in 2013, along with the Emil Sodersten Award for Interior Architecture. In the 2013 WA Architecture Awards, the building was awarded The George Temple Poole Award for best building overall, and The Jeffrey Howlett Award for Public Architecture. It won the Best in State Award from the Western Australia Design Institute of Australia in 2013. The building also won Best Public Building at the 2015 Property Council of Australia / Rider Levett Bucknall Innovation and Excellence Awards.

== Awards and nominations ==
=== Awards ===
- 2018 / WA Architecture Awards Richard Roach Jewell Award for Enduring Architecture / Allendale Square
- 2017 / WA Architecture Awards Richard Roach Jewell Award for Enduring Architecture / Reid Library
- 2017 / WA Architecture Awards Harold Krantz Award for Multiple Housing / The Pocket, Claremont
- 2017 / WA Architecture Awards Commendation for Multiple Housing / Heirloom by Match, Fremantle
- 2016 / WA Architecture Awards Architecture Award for Multiple Housing / Mika, South Beach
- 2015 / WA Architecture Awards Commendation for Multiple Housing / Helm, Port Coogee
- 2013 / AIA National Architecture Awards Sir Zelman Cowen Award for Public Architecture (in conjunction with ARM) / Perth Arena
- 2013 / AIA National Architecture Award Emil Sodersten Award for Interior Architecture (in conjunction with ARM) / Perth Arena
- 2013 / WA Architecture Awards George Temple Poole Award for Best Building (in conjunction with ARM) / Perth Arena
- 2013 / WA Architecture Awards Jeffrey Howlett Award for Public Architecture (in conjunction with ARM) / Perth Arena
- 2013 Shortlist – World Architecture Festival Award for Sports Architecture (in conjunction with ARM) / Perth Arena
- 2013 / WA DIA Design Awards Best in State (in conjunction with ARM) / Perth Arena
- 2013 / WA DIA Design Awards Award of Merit Interior Spaces-public (in conjunction with ARM) / Perth Arena
- 2014 / UDIA Award for Medium Density Housing in WA / Kingston, Cockburn Central
- 2012 / UDIA Award for Medium Density Housing in WA / Luxe, Cockburn Central
- 2010 / WA Architecture Awards Sustainable Architecture Award / Cameron Chisholm Nicol Offices
- 2010 / WA Architecture Awards Commendation for Multiple Housing (in conjunction with Architectus) / Islands, North Coogee

=== Nominations ===
- 2013 The National Association of Women in Construction (NAWIC) WA's Crystal Vision Awards Night Beata Szulc
- 2012 UDIA Awards for Excellence, Top Consultant for Somersault by Match in the High Density Development category

== See also ==
List of Australian architects
