= Workers' Memorial Sculpture =

Sculpture in Indiana by Daniel Edwards

Workers' Memorial
- Artist: Daniel Edwards
- Year: 1995
- Type: Bronze sculpture
- Location: Indiana Government Center; Indianapolis, Indiana, United States; 39°46′8.77″N 86°10′0.07″W

Workers' Memorial is a sculpture in Indiana, United States by artist Daniel Edwards made to commemorate workers who have died on the job. The memorial consists of three bronze workers standing atop a limestone base. The statue was unveiled in 1995 on Workers' Memorial Day, April 28, a day on which labor groups in Indianapolis annually commemorate fallen workers. Sponsored by the American Federation of Labor and Congress of Industrial Organizations (AFL–CIO), labor groups paid the entire $40,000 cost of the memorial.

== Description ==
Workers' Memorial depicts three bronze industrial workers standing atop a limestone base. Two of the workers are male and one is female. The bases of the proper right and the proper left workers are inscribed "D. EDWARDS 1995." The base of the center worker is inscribed with the names of people who helped create the statue, including design consultant Steve Mannheimer and carver Henry Conway. The sculptures were cast by the Scott Art Casting foundry. The inscription on the front of the base reads:

IN MEMORY OF ALL INDIANA / WORKERS WHO HAVE DIED AT WORK / OR AS A RESULT OF THEIR LABOR / DEDICATED / THIS WORKER MEMORIAL DAY / APRIL 28, 1995.

On the back of the base are plaques of several Indiana labor groups.

The memorial is located on the west side of the Indiana Government Center on West Street in Indianapolis, Indiana.

== Artist ==
Artist Daniel Edwards was born in La Porte, Indiana in 1965. He is an alumnus and former professor of the Herron School of Art. His other works of art in Indianapolis include The Landmark for Peace Memorial and several bronze bust portraitures housed in the National Art Museum of Sport. His most well-known works are often considered controversial and address celebrity and popular culture, including Britney Spears, Oprah Winfrey, Fidel Castro and Paris Hilton as subjects.

== See also ==
- Indiana Law Enforcement and Firefighter Memorial
- The Muster Point
