= National Police Memorial (Australia) =

Memorial in Canberra, Australia

Coordinates: 35.299°S 149.144°E

Australia's National Police Memorial is in the national capital, Canberra, in King's Park on the northern shore of Lake Burley Griffin adjacent to the National Carillon on Aspen Island. It commemorates Australian police who have died on duty.

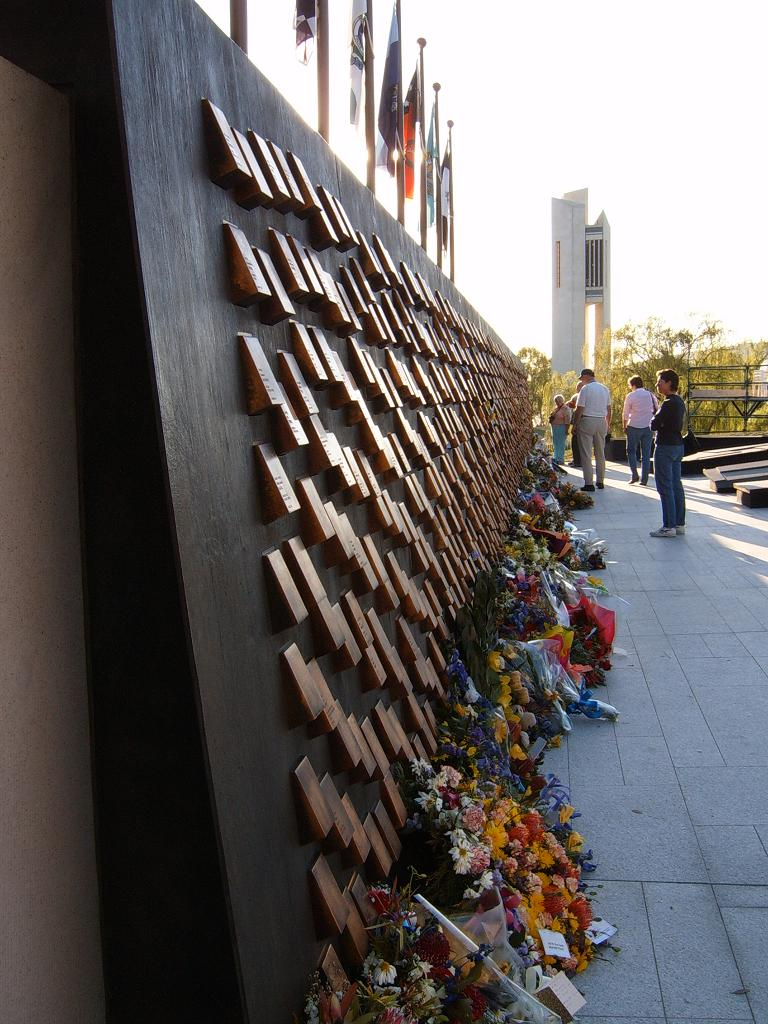
National Police Memorial commemorative wall of 'touchstones' with National Carillon behind. Floral tributes laid at official opening, 29 September 2006.

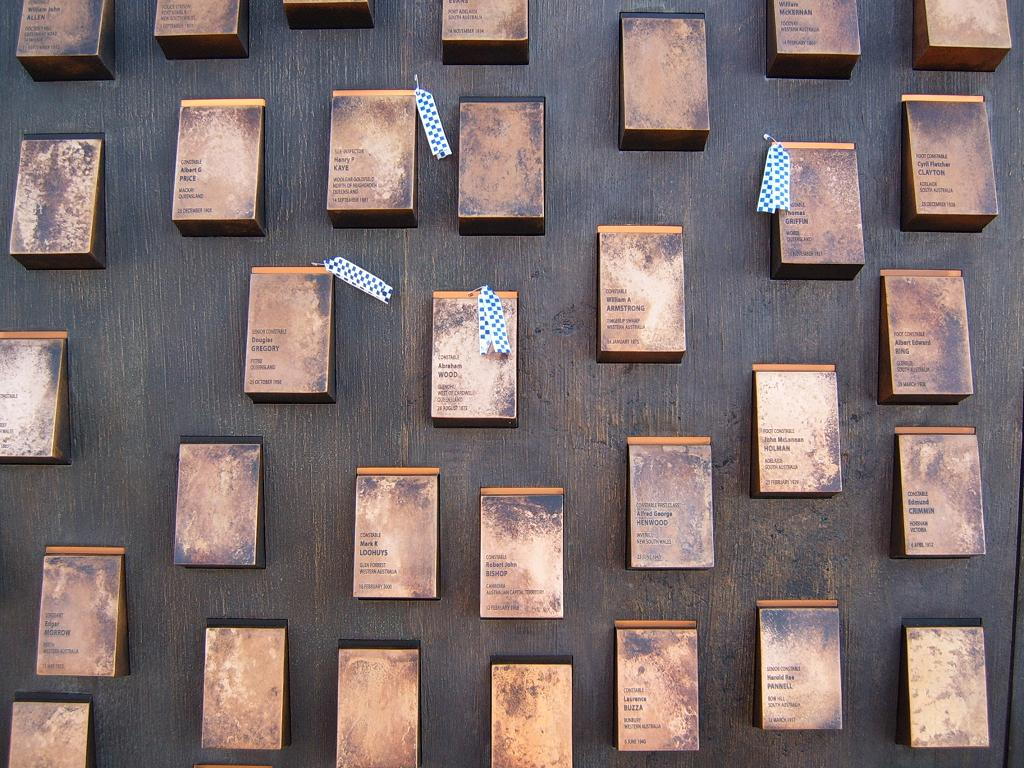
Touchstones with names of police who died on duty.

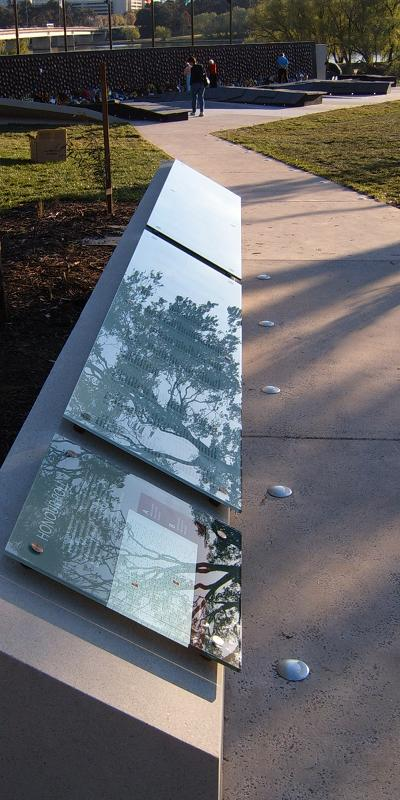
Honour roll with paved 'terrain' area and commemorative wall.

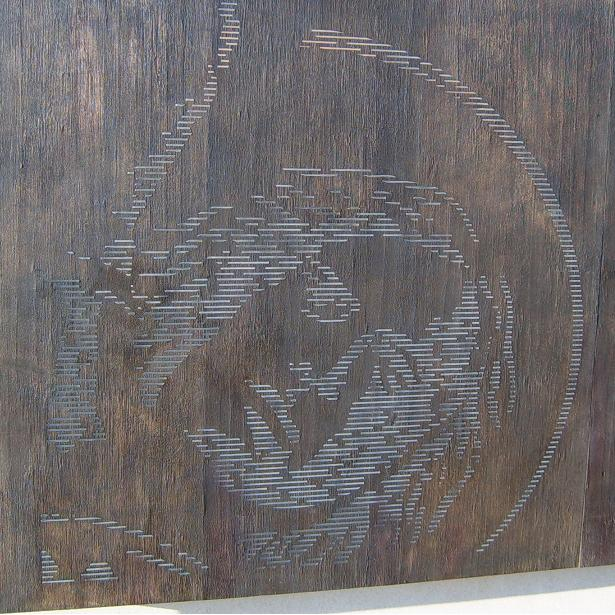
Saint Michael, patron saint of policing.

== Design ==
The two key elements of the design are:

- a bronze commemorative wall with 'touchstone plaques' carrying the name and rank, date of death (day, month and year), and place of death, of police officers who have died whilst on active duty;
- a large stone paved area or 'terrain' across which visitors move to gain access to the wall.

The surface of the touchstone wall is clad in cast bronze panels with a slight textural feel and a dark patina. The surface of the cladding is smooth enough to allow the patina to have a gloss wax finish. The touchstones are also cast bronze but have a golden, almost polished patina, that will change over time with the degree to which each stone is touched. There are 1200 touchstones, which is meant to symbolise the ongoing danger for police on duty.

The 'terrain' tilts to direct visitors to the wall, with undulations that is intended to create "an uncertainty in experience and reflects the uncertain path that police tread in the performance of their duty."

The design also incorporates elements acknowledging Saint Michael, the patron saint of policing.

Access roads have been constructed from King's Avenue, joining to the previous the lakeside road.

=== Design competition ===
A competition for the design was sponsored by the Australasian Police Ministers' Council (APMC), launched on 2 March 2005 by Senator Christopher Ellison, the Federal Minister for Justice and Customs. 77 entries were submitted by its close on 29 April 2005.

The memorial cost A$2.4 million.

The winning entry was by Fairweather Proberts Architects (Brisbane).

=== National Police Memorial Project Dedication Team ===
The Australian Federal Police Recognition and Ceremonial Team were given the honour in managing the Dedication Project.

== Dedication of the NPM ==
The Memorial was officially dedicated by Hon. John Howard, Prime Minister of Australia, on 29 September 2006, National Police Remembrance Day.

The Master of Ceremonies was Ita Buttrose.

More than 700 police from all states and the Australian Federal Police were gathered for the official opening, the first time since the opening of Old Parliament House in 1927 that there had been such a mass gathering of Australian police in Canberra.

=== Death of Constable Joseph Luker ===
The first policeman to die on duty was Constable Joseph Luker, aged 38, who died on 26 August 1803, after being bludgeoned to death when Sydney was only 15 years old.

=== Death of Sergeant Colin McKenzie ===
NSW Police Force members have suffered the largest losses of all Australian Police Forces, and to that end the last Australian Police Officer to die on duty before the official dedication was New South Wales Police Force Sergeant Colin McKenzie, aged 50, who died on 28 September 2006, the eve of the official opening, after falling ill at the Dedication rehearsal session at the National Police Memorial in Canberra. This 30-year veteran New South Wales Police Force policeman complained to colleagues of feeling ill, then collapsed and died. In memory of the Sergeant, Sergeant McKenzie's cap was carried by a NSW Police Force Sergeant on a cushion, leading the NSW Police Force Contingent in the march from Old Parliament House to the NPM in Kings Park, Canberra in a moving tribute.

== See also ==
- National Police Memorial UK
- National Law Enforcement Officers Memorial (U.S.)

=== Adjacent memorials ===
- National Workers Memorial (Australia)
- HMAS Canberra (D33)
