= Parliamentary Triangle, Canberra =

Ceremonial precinct of Canberra, Australia

Coordinates: 35°18′S 149°08′E

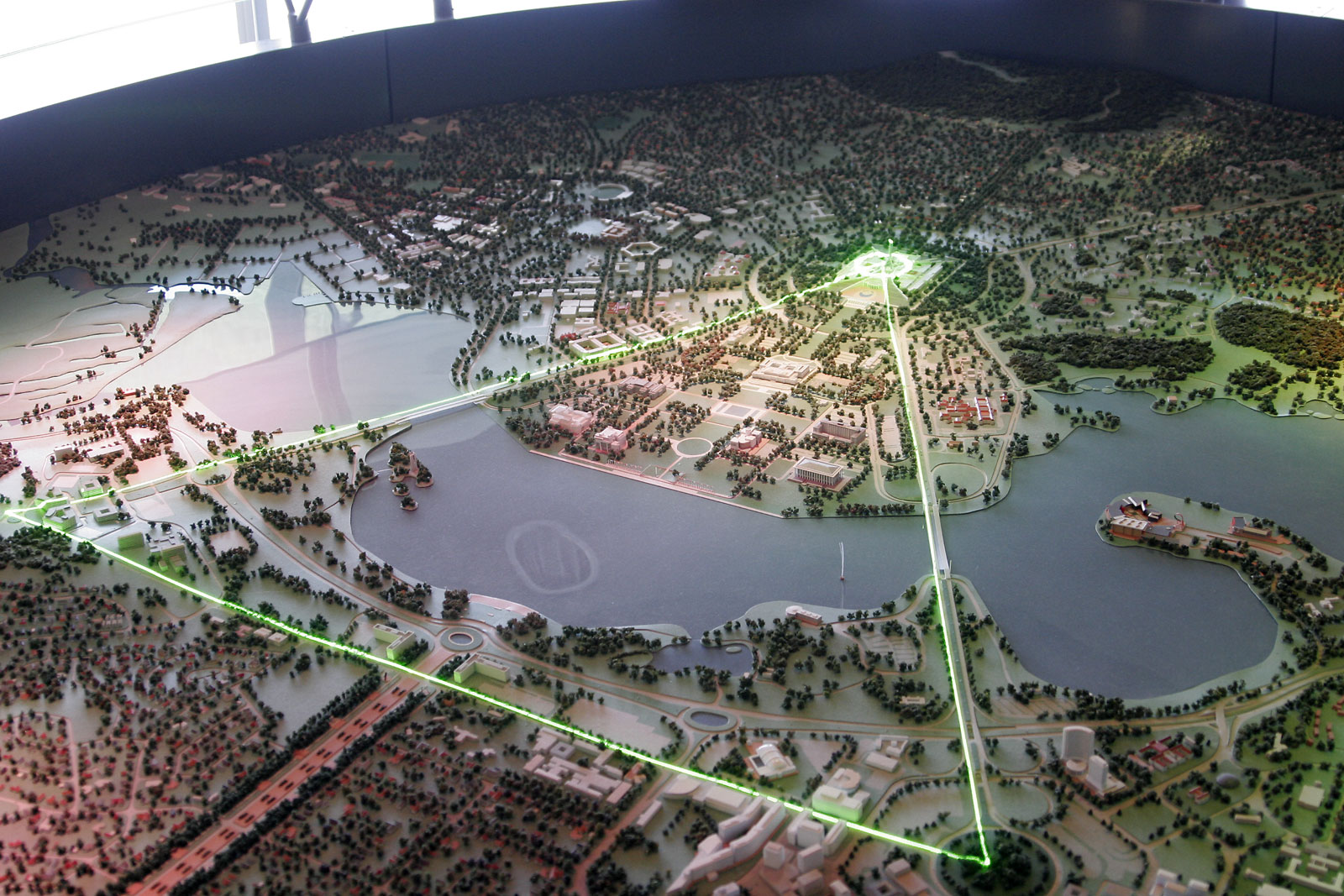
A model of Canberra with the Parliamentary Triangle shown by the green lasers

The National Triangle, also known as the Parliamentary Triangle, is the ceremonial precinct of Canberra, containing some of Australia's most important buildings. The Triangle is formed by Commonwealth, Kings and Constitution Avenues. Buildings within the National Triangle have been located and designed intentionally for visual effect, and those of national significance are popular tourist attractions.

The National Triangle was a significant feature of Walter Burley Griffin's Plan for Canberra. The apices of the triangle are Parliament House, the seat of government; the Defence Headquarters at Russell; and City Hill, representing the civilian part of Canberra. Griffin planned the city around two axes which converge in the centre of the National Triangle. The land axis connects Mount Ainslie, Capital Hill and Red Hill and extends off towards Mount Bimberi the Australian Capital Territory's highest mountain. The water axis runs at right angles to the land axis along the length of Lake Burley Griffin.

The southern shore of Lake Burley Griffin bisects the National Triangle forming a smaller Triangle known as the Parliamentary Zone bounded by Kings and Commonwealth Avenues.

Consistent with Walter Burley Griffin's Garden City design, the National Triangle is characterised by streets lined with large deciduous trees, and buildings set in expanses of grassed parkland. Consequently, it has a very open feel and buildings are located several minutes walk away from one another. It was Griffin's original intention for more grand government buildings to be located within the precinct, but these have not eventuated as yet.

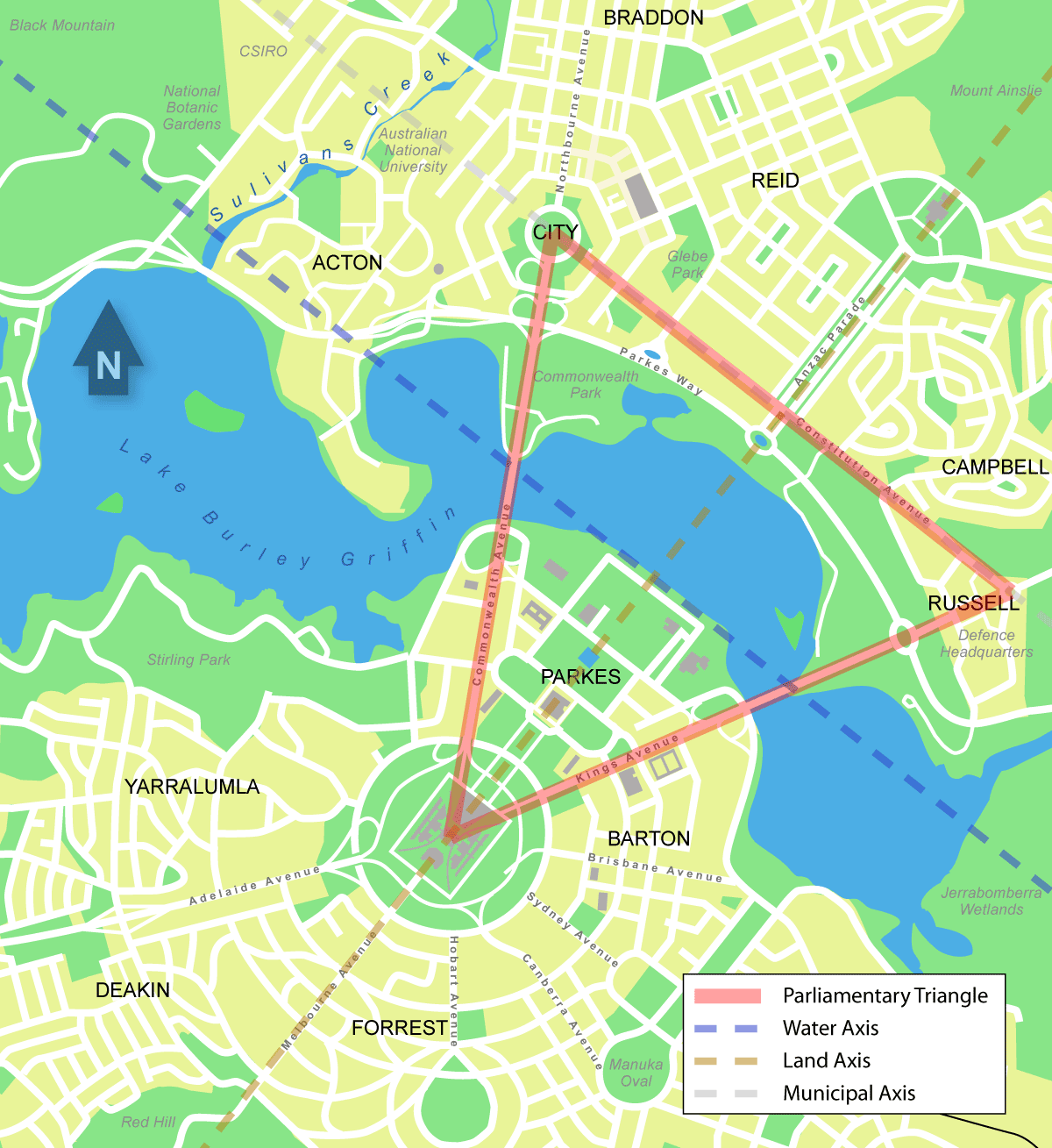
A map of inner Canberra showing the Parliamentary Triangle in red.

Development within the National Triangle is strictly controlled by the National Capital Authority, an agency of the Commonwealth Government (not the ACT Government) within the Department of Infrastructure, Transport, Regional Development, Communications, Sport and the Arts.

== Significant buildings and monuments ==
The area covered by the National Triangle corresponds largely with the suburb of Parkes. Parliament House and Old Parliament House are the most significant features within the National Triangle. Other buildings significant to the design and symmetry of the Triangle are the High Court and the National Gallery, located near Lake Burley Griffin, forward of Old Parliament House and to the east, and the National Library and Questacon located forward of Old Parliament House and to the west. Commonwealth Place is located at the centre of the lakeshore and Commonwealth Park and Kings Park line the opposite shore of the lake.

Other significant buildings within the precinct include the Department of the Treasury and the John Gorton Building. The National Carillon, a gift from the British government which marked 50 years since the establishment of Canberra, is located on Queen Elizabeth II Island. The National Rose Garden is located beside old Parliament House and the Aboriginal Tent Embassy is located in front of it. Reconciliation Place, a monument to reconciliation between Australia's indigenous people and the settler population is located near the High Court. The National Archives and 'West Block' – old departmental offices – are located behind the Old Parliament House near Kings Avenue and Commonwealth Avenue respectively. Other government departments, such as the Attorney-General's Department and the Department of Prime Minister and Cabinet are located in the suburb of Barton nearby.

== Connection with Washington, D.C., and Brasília ==
Brasília has a triangular shape.

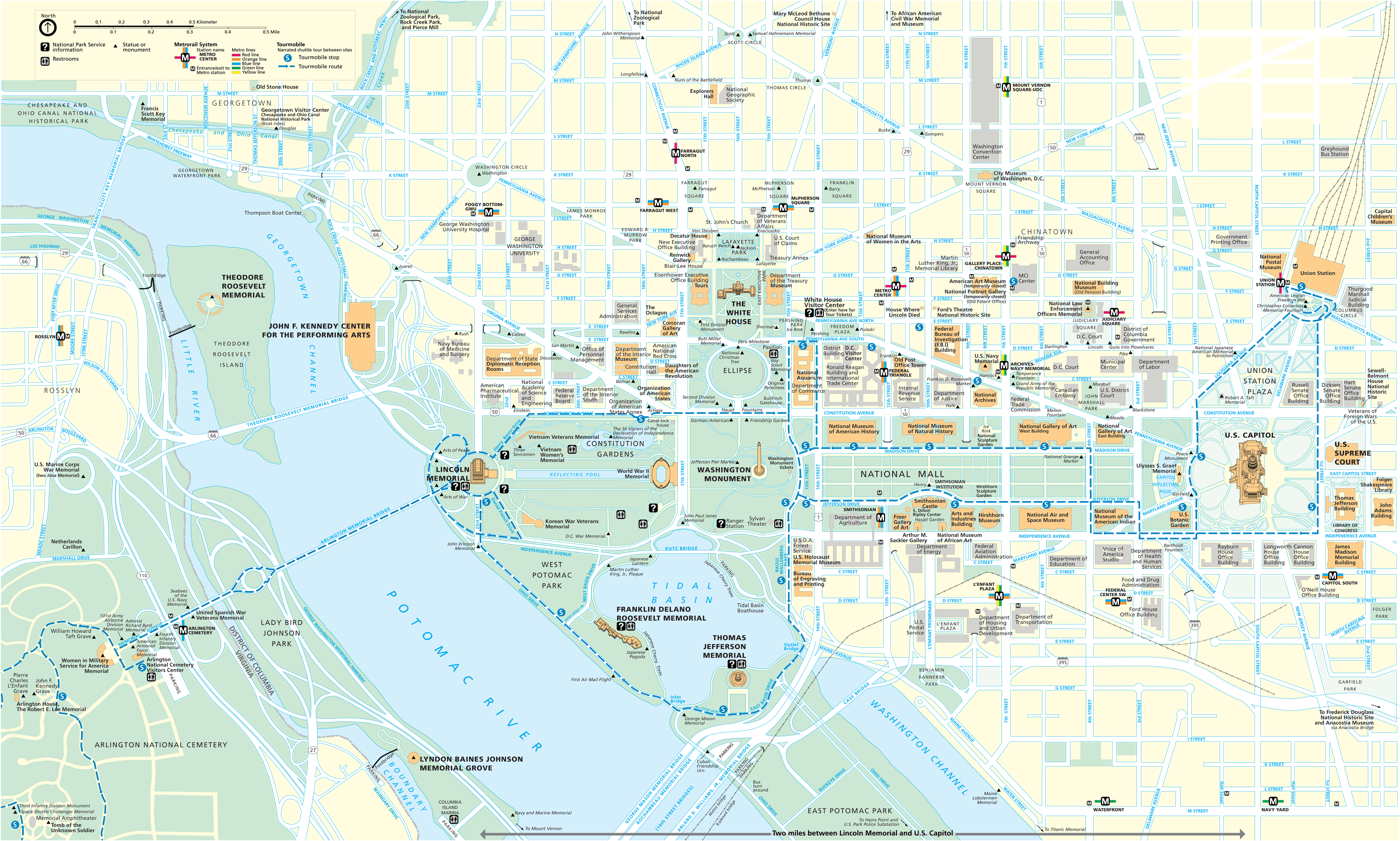
The United States Capitol sits on top of a triangle in Washington, D.C.

There are similarities between the design of Canberra and those of Washington, D.C. and Brasília. The three cities consist of triangular axes that link the seats of government with other monuments and important places.

== See also ==
- Parliament Hill, Ottawa

== External reference ==
- Parliament Act 1974
- City Hill - Urban Services
- The National Capital Expands - NCA
- Parliamentary Zone Info Sheet
