= Australian Merchant Navy Memorial =

Coordinates: 35.297°S 149.144°E

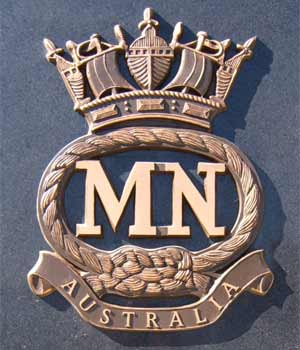
Australian Merchant Navy badge

The Australian Merchant Navy Memorial is a memorial honouring the Australian Merchant Navy's involvement in World War I and World War II. It is located in Kings Park, on the northern shore of Lake Burley Griffin in Canberra, the national capital city of Australia. Its location at the shore of the lake represent's the Merchant Navy's relationship with water. It was unveiled on 7 October 1990 by Bill Hayden AC, Governor-General of Australia. A memorial service is held on the first Sunday on or after 21 October each year.

== Design ==
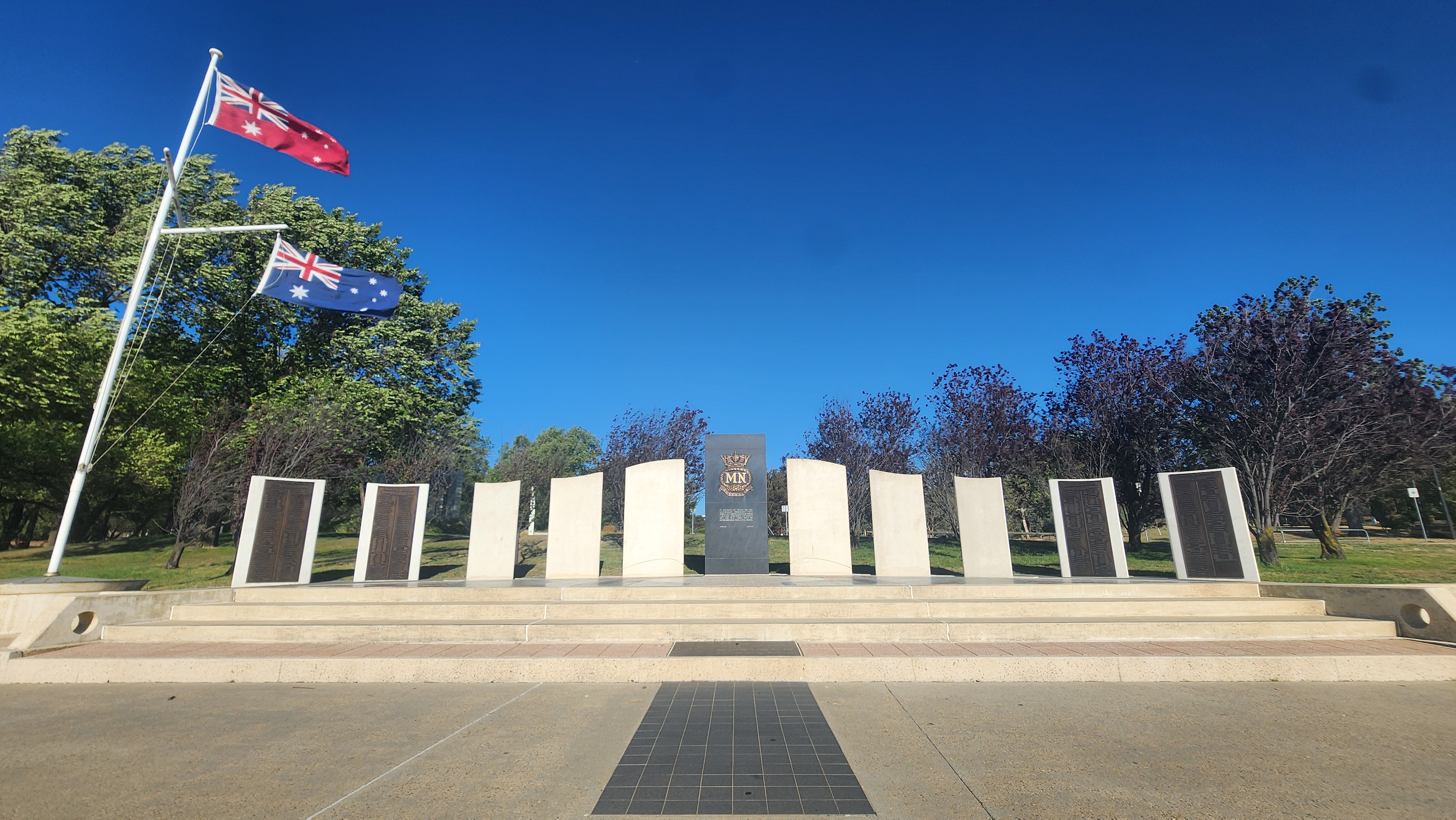
The Australian Merchant Navy Memorial in January 2026

The memorial was designed by Daryl Jackson Alastair Swayn architects and symbolises the Merchant Navy and the sea. It consists of seven columns, a dias, concrete drums, and a flagpole.

- The central granite column symbolises the "Remembrance";
- The six flanking concrete columns symbolise the bows of ships with the bow-waves either side;
- The plan symbolises the globe of the Earth spinning on its axis;
- The paving pattern of the dais represents the camouflage patterns used by merchant ships during World War I, while the red crosses represent the hospital ships that were crewed by merchant sailors;
- The concrete drums at each end of the north-south axis represent compass cards that symbolise navigation;
- The flagpole is a nautical style with a yardarm and gaff.

The inscription on the memorial reads:

"In honour of those of the Australian Merchant Navy who gave their lives for their country and have no known grave but the sea. They will be remembered for ever more. 1914-1918 1939-1945."

== See also ==
- Merchant Navy Day
