= Merchant navy =

Fleet of merchant vessels that are registered in a specific country

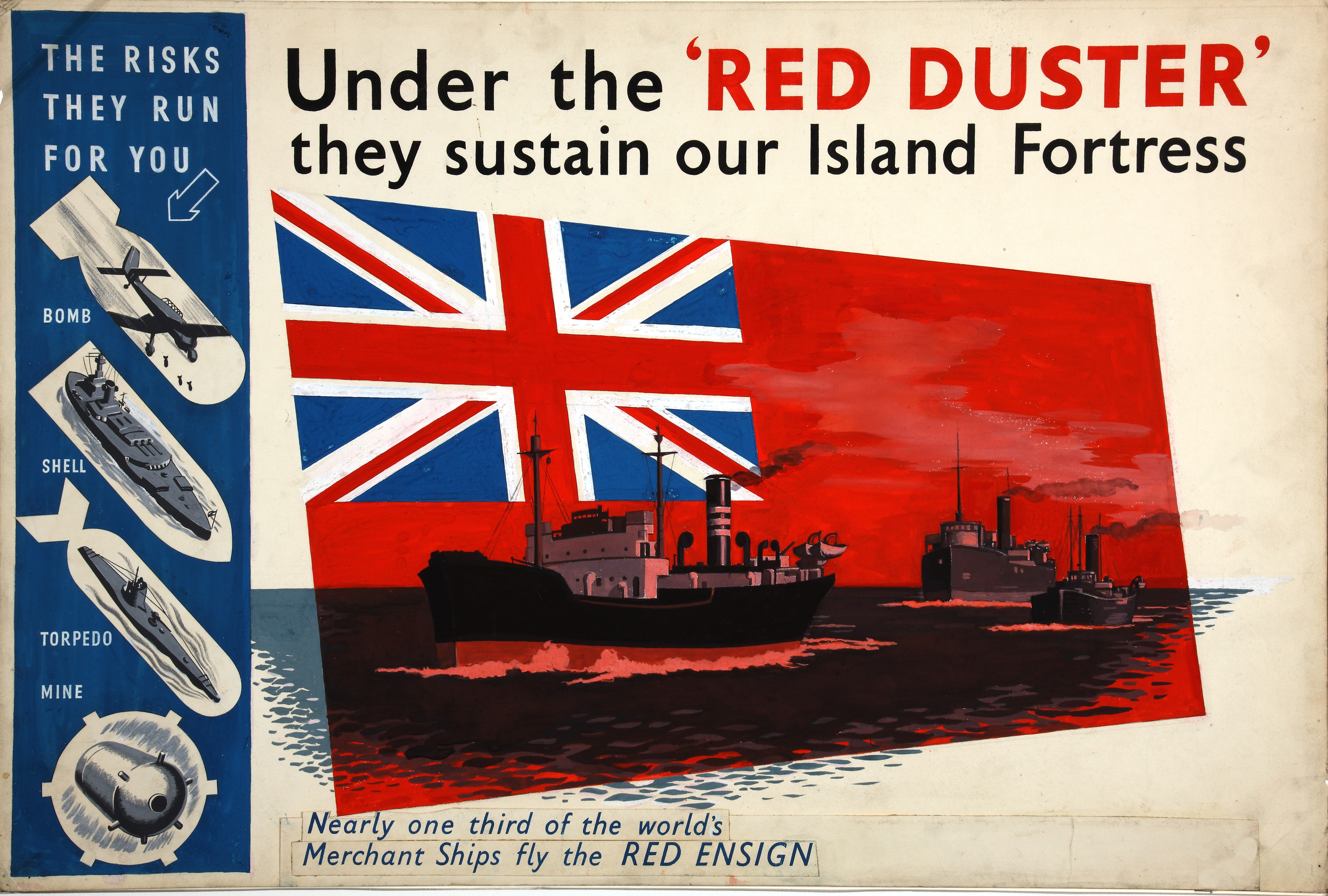
British propaganda during World War II highlighted the role of Britain's Merchant Navy in sustaining the Allied war effort.

A merchant navy or merchant marine is the fleet of merchant vessels that are registered in a specific country. On merchant vessels, seafarers of various ranks and sometimes members of maritime trade unions are required by the International Convention on Standards of Training, Certification and Watchkeeping for Seafarers (STCW) to carry Merchant Mariner's Documents.

King George V bestowed the title of the "Merchant Navy" on the British merchant shipping fleets following their service in World War I; since then a number of other nations have also adopted use of that title or the similar "Merchant Marine". In most jurisdictions, they are seen on the same level as Road or Air Transportation. However, in some countries, such as the UK, due to their uniformed identity and previous war and peace time contributions they are seen as a uniformed 'service'. This is demonstrated in the UK by the Red Ensign and Blue Ensign being on the sides of The Cenotaph in London.

The following is a partial list of the merchant navies or merchant marines of various countries. In many countries the fleet's proper name is simply the capitalized version of the common noun ("Merchant Navy").

== By country ==
=== Australian Merchant Navy ===
During the First World War, the government requisitioned Australian merchant vessels for use as transport ships, hospital ships and cargo ships. During World War II, they were commissioned for use as hospital ships, supply ships and armed merchant cruisers, in particular in the Pacific campaign. Since 2008, 3 September has been officially commemorated as Merchant Navy Day, on the same day as the pre-existing Australian National Flag Day, which allows the Australian Red Ensign to be flown on land for the occasion as a matter of protocol, as an official recognition of the merchant navy's contribution in wartime. The Australian Merchant Navy Memorial in Canberra, the national capital city of Australia, is a memorial honouring the Australian Merchant Navy's involvement in both world wars.

=== British Merchant Navy ===
The British Merchant Navy comprises the British merchant ships that transport cargo and people or conduct specialist tasks during times of peace and war.

For much of its history, the merchant navy was the largest merchant fleet in the world, but with the decline of the British Empire in the mid-20th century it slipped down the rankings. In 1939, the merchant navy was the largest in the world with 33% of total tonnage. By 2012, the merchant navy held only 3% of total tonnage.

=== Canadian Merchant Navy ===
Canada, like several other Commonwealth nations, created its own merchant navy in a large-scale effort in World War II. Established in 1939, the Canadian Merchant Navy played a major role in the Battle of the Atlantic bolstering the Allies' merchant fleet due to high losses in the British Merchant Navy.

Eventually thousands of Canadians served in the merchant navy aboard hundreds of Canadian merchant ships, notably the "Park Ship", the Canadian equivalent of the American "Liberty Ship". A school at St. Margarets Bay, Nova Scotia, trained Canadian merchant mariners. "Manning pools", merchant navy barracks, were built in Canadian ports.

=== Greek Merchant Navy ===
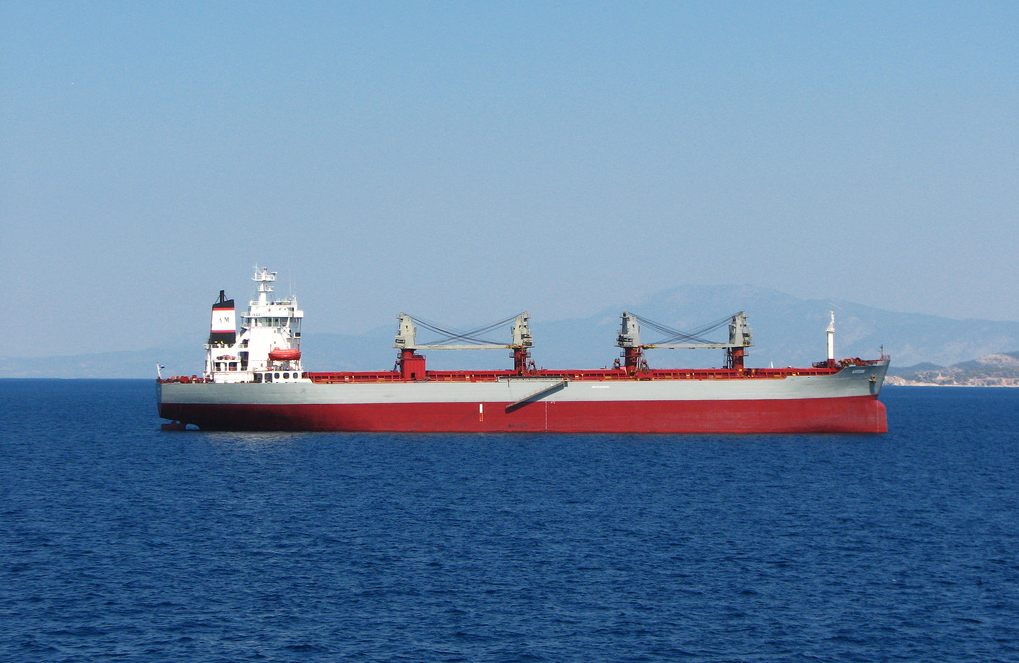
Greece controls 23.2% of the world's total merchant fleet, making it the largest in the world.

The Greek maritime fleet is today engaged in commerce and transportation of goods and services universally. It consists of the merchant vessels owned by Greek civilians, flying either the Greek flag or a flag of convenience.

Greece is a maritime nation by tradition, as shipping is arguably the oldest form of occupation of the Greeks and a key element of Greek economic activity since ancient times. In 2015, the Greek Merchant Marine controlled the world's largest merchant fleet in terms of tonnage with a total DWT of 334,649,089 tons and a fleet of 5,226 Greek owned vessels, according to Lloyd's List. Greece is also ranked highly regarding all types of ships, including first for tankers and bulk carriers.

=== Indian Merchant Navy ===
The birth of the modern Indian Merchant Navy occurred before independence from the United Kingdom, when in 1919 SS Loyalty sailed from India to Britain. Today, India ranks 15th in the world in terms of total DWT. India currently supplies around 12.8% of officers and around 14.5% of ratings to the world seafaring community. This is one of the highest of any country.

India has many merchant shipping companies. Some of the prominent shipping companies in India are Great Eastern Shipping, Tolani Shipping, SCI now a private company, and Seven Islands Shipping which is an ownership company.

=== New Zealand Merchant Navy ===
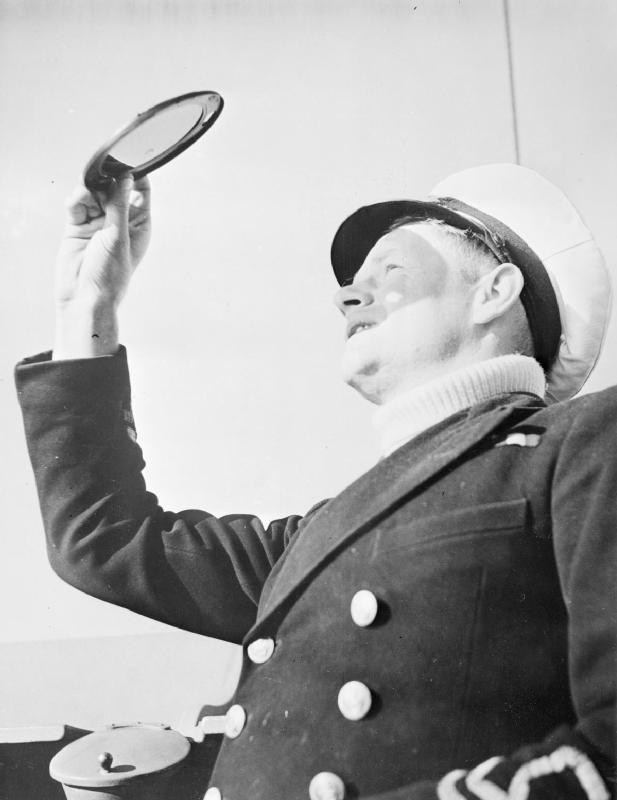
A portrait of a New Zealand Merchant Navy captain of a Fairmile 'submarine chaser', as he holds up and looks through a small coloured screen. This disc allows him to look into the sky to search for dive bombers without damaging his eyes.

In December 1939, 3,000 seafarers were employed and 186 merchant vessels were on the New Zealand Registry (many larger New Zealand vessels were however registered in London for insurance purposes). Some foreign vessels were impressed, including the four-masted barque, Pamir.

New Zealand, like several other Commonwealth nations, created a merchant navy. However, the "wartime Merchant Navy was neither a military force nor a single coherent body", instead it was "a diverse collection of private companies and ships".

Although some ships were involved in the Atlantic and North Pacific trade, mostly this involved domestic and South Pacific cargos. New Zealand-owned ships were involved in trade with the United Kingdom (84% of all New Zealand exports in 1939) and the majority of New Zealand seamen had served with the British Merchant Navy.

Over the course of the war, 64 ships were sunk by enemy action on the New Zealand–UK route, and 140 merchant seafarers died (a similar number were also taken prisoner).

=== Pakistani Merchant Navy ===
The Pakistan Merchant Navy was formed in 1947. The Ministry of Railways and Communication (Port and Shipping Wing), Mercantile Marine Department and Shipping Office established by the Government of Pakistan. Who were authorized to flag the ships and also ensured that the vessels were sea worthy. All of the private shipping companies merged and formed the National Shipping Corporation (NSC) and the Pakistan Shipping Corporation (PSC) and as a result they had a common flag. Among these companies were the Muhammadi Steamship Company Limited and the East & West Steamship Company.

In the Indo-Pakistani war of 1971 Pakistan suffered a great loss, and most of Pakistani vessels were left in Bangladesh, because of having Bengali speaking crew on them. On 1 January 1974, President of Pakistan Zulfiqar Ali Bhutto nationalized the National Shipping Corporation and Pakistan Shipping Corporation, and formed the Pakistan National Shipping Corporation (PNSC) with the intent of reestablishing the Pakistan Merchant Navy. Later, the company was incorporated under the provisions of the Pakistan National Shipping Corporation Ordinance of 1979 and the Companies Ordinance of 1984.

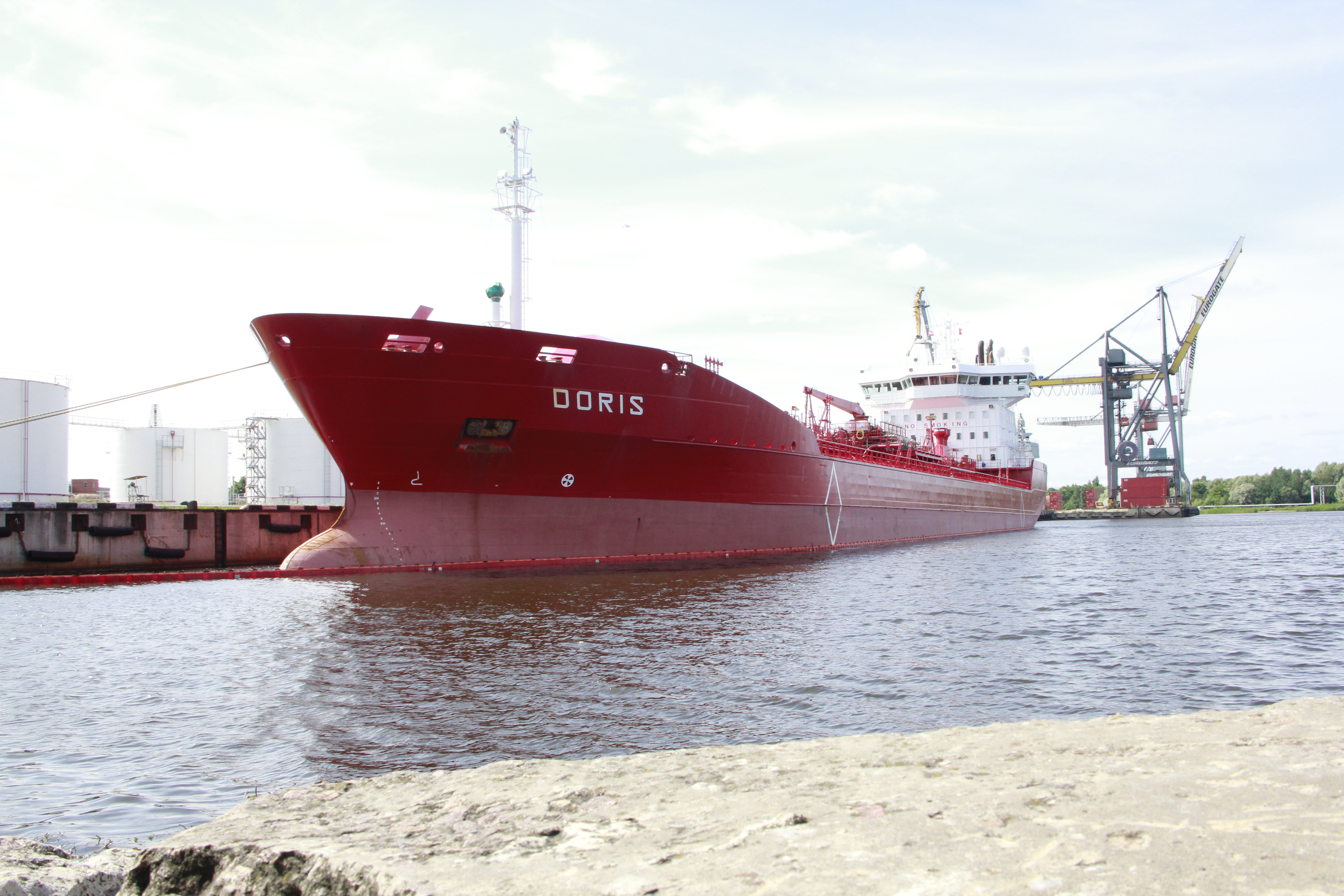
Bulk carrier merchant navy ship

Today, the Pakistan National Shipping Corporation is the national flag carrier. The corporation's head office is located in Karachi. A regional office based in Lahore caters for upcountry shipping requirements. The corporation also has an extensive overseas network of agents looking after its worldwide shipping business. The Pakistan National Shipping Corporation also has several subsidiary companies.

=== Polish Merchant Navy ===
The Polish Merchant Navy (Polish: Polska Marynarka Handlowa, PMH) was created in the interwar period when the Second Polish Republic regained independence. During World War II, many ships of the Polish Navy joined the Allied merchant navy and its convoys as part of the Polish contribution to World War II.

After the war, the Polish Merchant Navy was controlled by the People's Republic of Poland and, after 1989, by modern Poland. As of 1999, the PMH controlled 57 ships (of 1,000 GT or over) totaling 1,120,165 gross tonnage (GT)/1,799,569 tonnes deadweight (DWT) including 50 bulk carriers, two general cargo ships, two chemical tankers, one roll-on/roll-off ship and two short-sea passenger ships.

=== Swiss Merchant Marine ===
Switzerland, despite being a landlocked country, has a civilian high seas fleet of merchant vessels, whose home port is Basel, on the Rhine. The first ships were purchased and operated by the government in order to ensure the supply of critical resources during World War II. After the war, a privately owned merchant fleet emerged, spurred in part by government subsidies that paid for the fleet's operation up until 1953. As of 2006, 26 ships (mostly container carriers) totalling 479,624 tons, operated by five shipping companies, flew the Swiss flag.

=== U.S. Merchant Marine ===
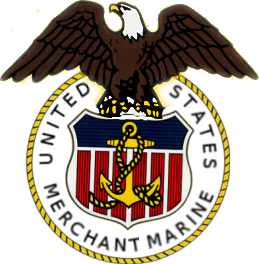
Seal of the US Merchant Marine

The United States Merchant Marine is made up of the nation's civilian-owner merchant ships and government owned ships (Military Sealift Command, NOAA, Army Corps of Engineers, Department of Homeland Security), and the men and women who crew them. The merchant marine transports cargo and passengers during peacetime. In time of war, the merchant marine is an auxiliary to the navy and can be called upon to deliver troops and supplies for the military.

The people of the merchant marine are called "merchant mariners", and are civilians except in times of war, when, in accordance with the Merchant Marine Act of 1936, they are considered military personnel. As of 2009, the U.S. merchant fleet numbered 422 ships and approximately 69,000 people.

Not included in these numbers are the over 700 ships which are owned by American interests but are registered, or flagged, in other countries.

== See also ==
- Affreightment
- List of merchant navy capacity by country
- Maritime history
- Maritime flag
  - Flag of convenience
- Seafarer's professions and ranks
- Ship transport
- World War II United States Merchant Navy
