= The Muster Point =

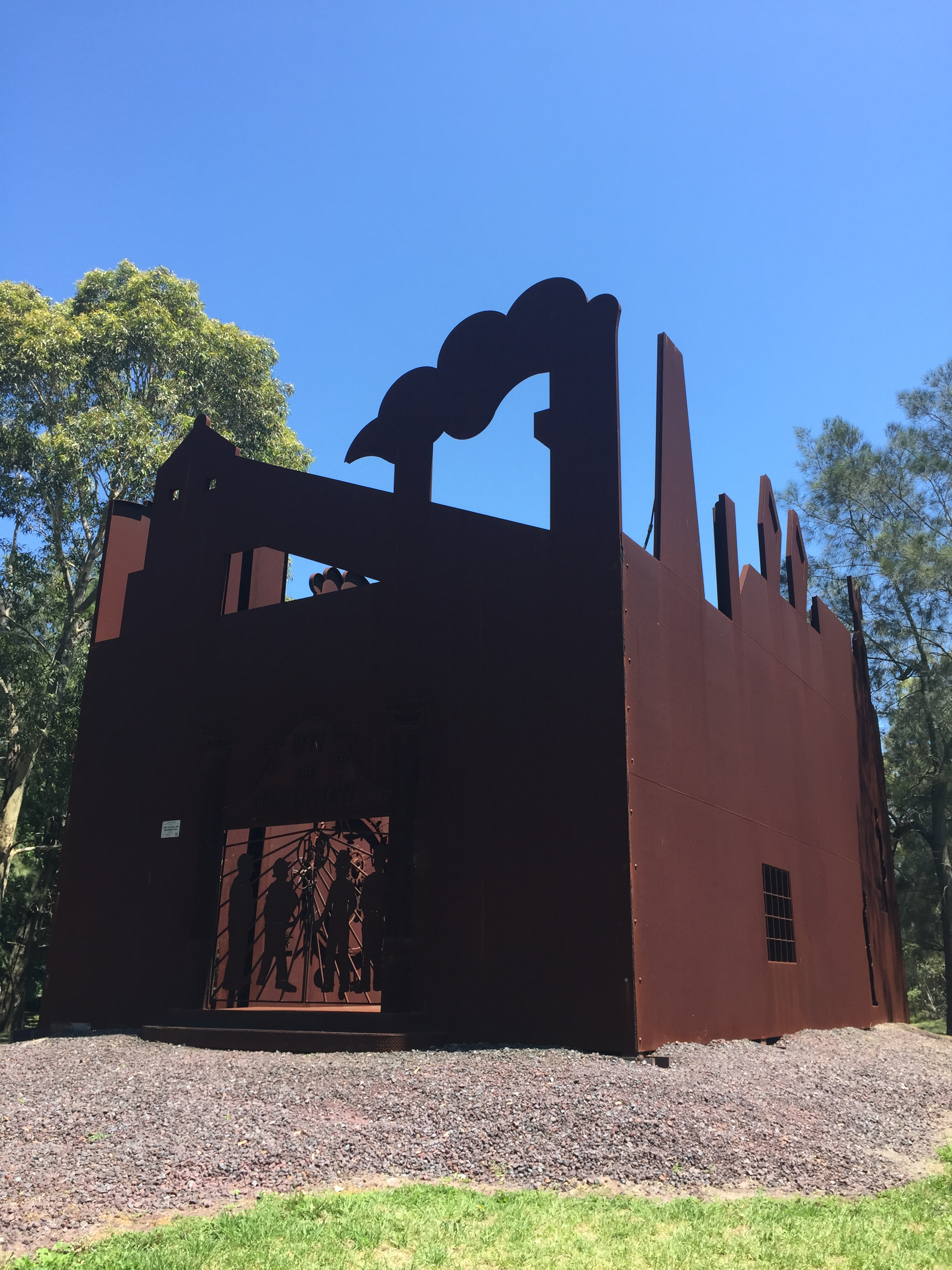
- Artist: Julie Squires
- Year: 1999
- Type: Steel and bronze sculpture
- Location: Newcastle, New South Wales, Australia; 32°53′57″S 151°45′13″E

The Muster Point is a monumental public sculpture in Newcastle, Australia that commemorates the Newcastle Steelworks of BHP and its workers. The plant closed after 84 years in operation. One former worker estimated that "from 1915 to 1961 over 67,000 people had worked on the site". It was fabricated of steel and bronze by sculptor Julie Squires and BHP workers in the Fabrication Shop before the plant closed down. The seventy tonne monument is eight metres high, sixteen metres long and twelve metres wide, and demonstrates the significance of steel making to the city of Newcastle. It was installed on Industrial Drive, in the suburb of Mayfield in 1999.

== Site ==
The land on which the work is installed is part of the site of the steelworks, originally chosen for its proximity to coal. The art work site in Muster Point Park was important to the members of the Newcastle Industrial Heritage Association and to former employees, who wanted to build the memorial. The nearby Newcastle Steelworkers Memorial by artist/ blacksmith Will Maguire which specifically "honours those who lost their lives in the steelmaking industry in Newcastle from 1915 to 1999" was dedicated on 2 June 2015.

== Artist ==
Sculptor Julie Squires was born in Newcastle in 1966. She trained at the Hunter Institute of Technology and Newcastle University and has created other works in bronze and other public art works in Newcastle, including Destiny at Dyke Point, which was commissioned by the Newcastle Port Corporation to mark 200 years of operation as Australia's first commercial port.

== Design ==
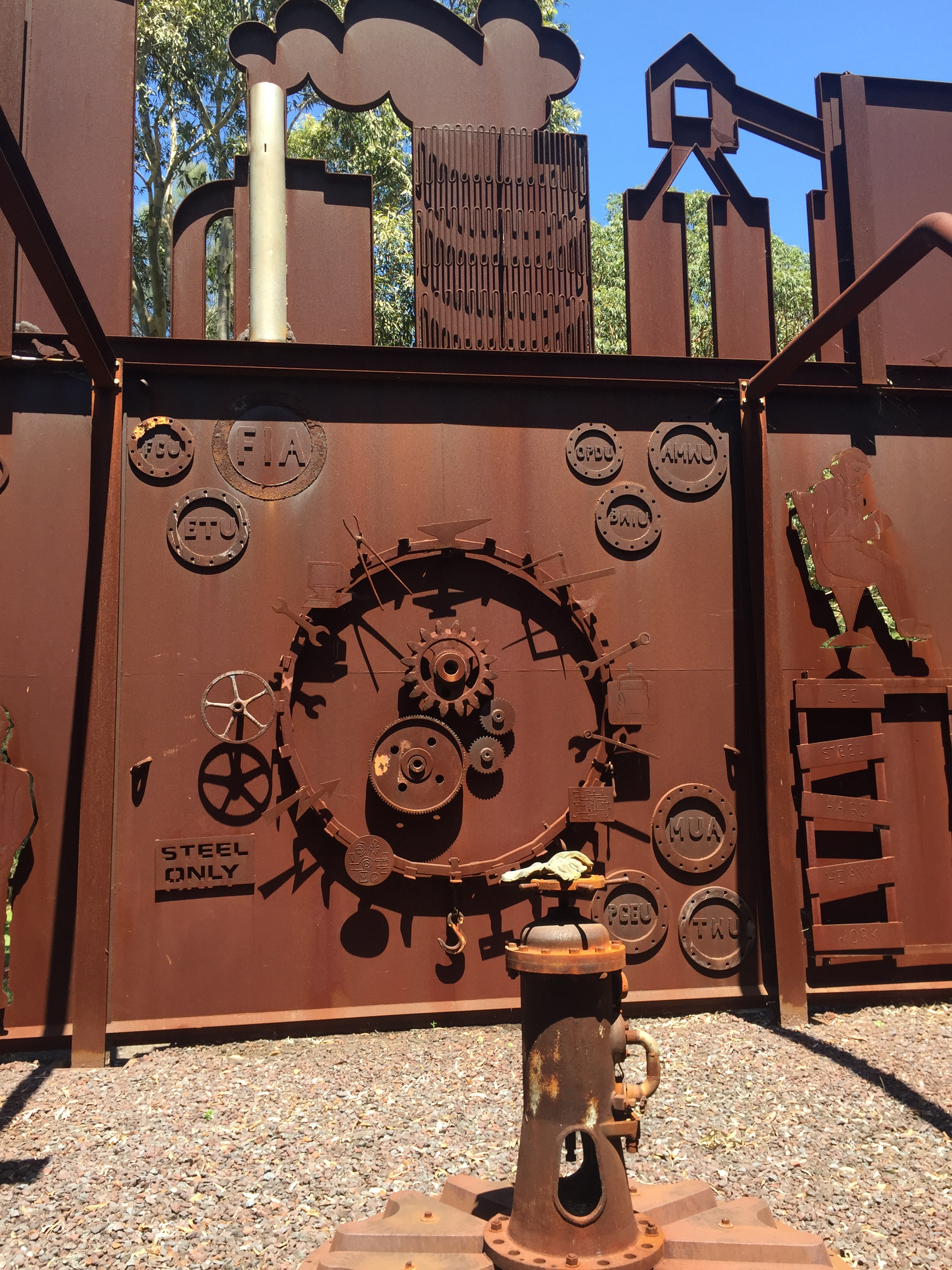
Trade union acknowledgements on wall beyond commemorative pair of bronze industrial gloves

The Muster Point is designed as a "walk-through" steel and bronze sculpture with gates that are locked but can be opened to allow access. The sculptor described the Muster Point work "as a visual analogy to reflect the real life experiences of the employees of the Newcastle Steelworks, prior to the closure of the plant".

Items associated with work at the steelworks are included in the design. For example, there is a whistle and a clock as well as a locomotive driver to represent the rail that moved all the steel. The images of four men on the gates represent friendship and the four walls create a skyline profile that references the one seen when looking at the plant. The cats are in recognition that the animals were dumped in the area.

The relevant trade unions associated with steel manufacture are acknowledged by their initials, incorporated into one wall. Among them are the Federated Ironworkers' Association of Australia, the Maritime Union of Australia, the Transport Workers Union of Australia, the Electrical Trades Union of Australia, the Building Workers Industrial Union, the Operative Painters and Decorators Union, the Federated Clerks Union of Australia, the Australian Manufacturing Workers Union.

A cross is incorporated into the design to honour the people who lost their lives doing dangerous work for BHP.

== See also ==
- Memory Lines (2004) in List of public art in the city of Sydney
- National Workers Memorial (Australia)
