= National Carillon =

Bell instrument in Canberra, Australia

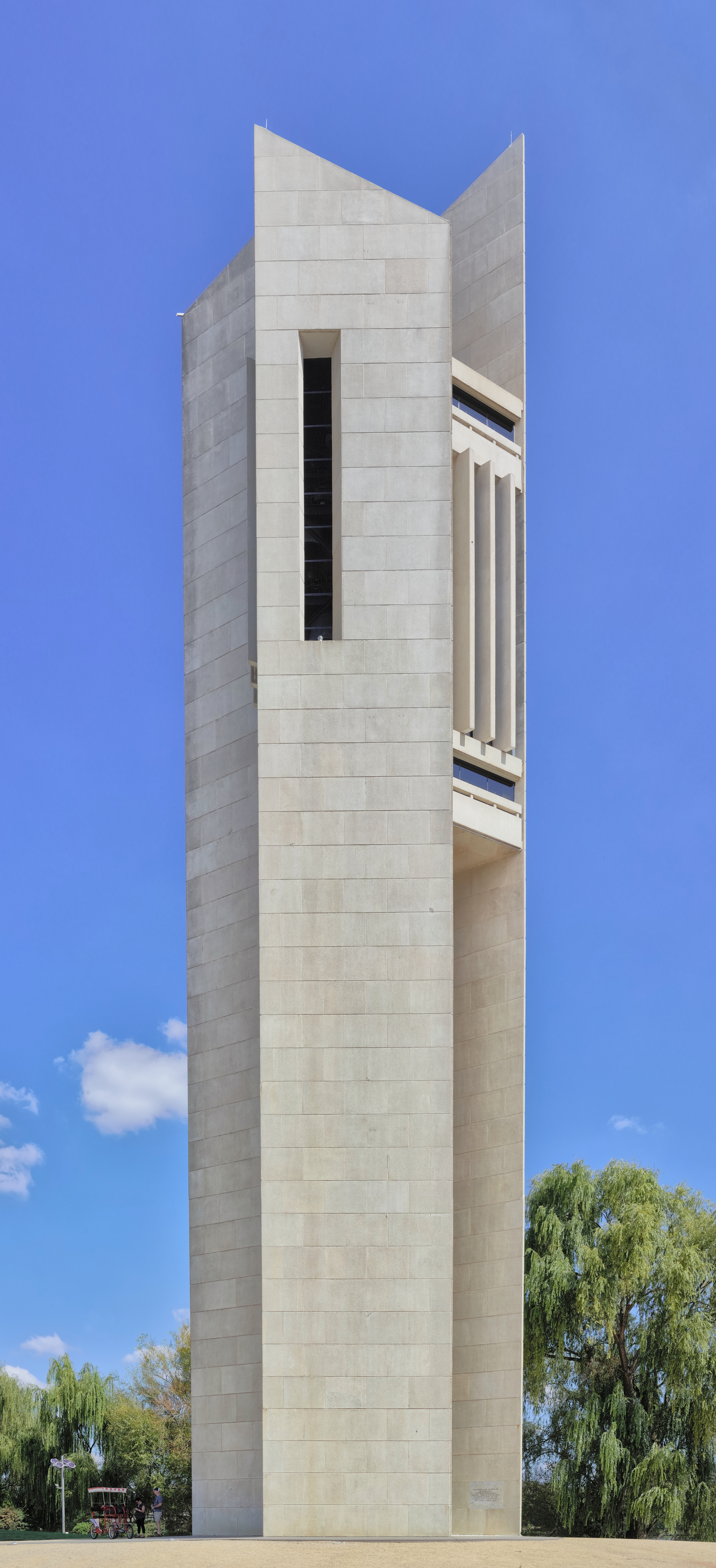
- National Carillon in 2016
- Interactive map of the National Carillon area

General information
- Status: Completed
- Type: Carillon
- Architectural style: Brutalist
- Location: Queen Elizabeth II Island, Lake Burley Griffin, Canberra, Australian Capital Territory, Australia
- Coordinates: 35°17′55″S 149°08′30″E
- Inaugurated: 26 April 1970 by Elizabeth II
- Renovated: 2004
- Owner: Commonwealth of Australia
- Landlord: National Capital Authority

Height
- Height: 50 m (164 ft)

Technical details
- Material: Concrete

Design and construction
- Architecture firm: Cameron Chisholm Nicol
- Other designers: John Taylor & Co (bells)

Commonwealth Heritage List
- Official name: Carillon, Wendouree Dr, Parkes, ACT, Australia
- Type: Listed place
- Criteria: D. and E.
- Designated: 22 June 2004
- Reference no.: 105346

The National Carillon is a large carillon situated on Queen Elizabeth II Island in Lake Burley Griffin, central Canberra, in the Australian Capital Territory, Australia. The carillon is managed and maintained by the National Capital Authority on behalf of the Commonwealth of Australia. It has 57 bells, ranging nearly 5 octaves from the 6,108 kg (13,466 lb) bass bell in F# to the 8 kg (18 lb) treble bell in D.

== History ==
The carillon was a gift from the British government to the people of Australia to commemorate the 50th anniversary of the national capital, Canberra. The structure was the subject of a limited competition between three selected Australian architects and three selected British architects. Assessors of the competition were Lord Holford, Sir Donald Gibson and Sir John Overall (Chairman of the National Capital Development Commission). The winners were the Western Australian firm of Cameron Chisholm Nicol. The carillon was designed in 1967, built during 1969 and completed in 1970. The three columns of the design symbolise the British and Australian governments and the City of Canberra. Queen Elizabeth II officially opened the National Carillon on 26 April 1970. The carillon has a symbolic value in the link between Britain and Australia. It also has some historic value for its association with the commemoration of the 50th jubilee of the founding of Canberra. The tower stands 50 m (160 ft) tall. The concept was developed in 1968 by Don Ho, an architect at Cameron Chisholm Nicol. The carillon bells and mechanism were designed and constructed by John Taylor & Co of Loughborough, England.

The carillon is a good example of the late twentieth century Brutalist style. Its use of strong shapes which are boldly composed, the diagonal line of the roofs, large areas of blank wall, use of precast non-load-bearing wall panels and strongly vertical windows and openings are all features of this style.

=== 2019 upgrade ===
In 2019, the carillon was upgraded with a new clavier, a fully replaced transmission and the addition of two new bells to add the lowest semitone and a new highest bell. The new lowest semitone bell was called the Ngunnawal bell, in recognition of the first peoples of the Canberra region. This bell weighs just over 5 tonnes and sounds the note G. The other bell added was a new lightest bell to extend the range of the instrument to nearly 5 octaves. This work was carried out by John Taylor & Co.

The work was delayed by the onset of the COVID-19 pandemic.

== Characteristics ==
Carillons must have at least 23 bells to be considered as such, and the National Carillon has 57. It was initially installed with 53, and increased to 55 during refurbishments in 2003-2004. Each bell weighs between 7 kg (15 lb) and 6 t (5.9 long tons; 6.6 short tons). The bells span four and a half octaves chromatically. John Douglas Gordon, after whom the Queen Elizabeth II Island footbridge is now named, played the inaugural recital.

The carillon features moderate-size function facilities for small gatherings offering views over Lake Burley Griffin and central Canberra.

The carillon is in regular use, chiming every quarter-hour and playing a short tune on the hour along with tours and recitals on many days. For example, there is usually a recital of carols on Christmas Eve each year with music being played for around an hour at dusk. The best place to listen to the carillon is suggested to be within 100 m (330 ft) of the building though the sound can usually be heard much further away in the Parliamentary Triangle, Kingston and Civic.

The quarter-hourly chimes of the National Carillon are reminiscent of those of Big Ben at London's Houses of Parliament.

=== Links to memorials ===
The adjacent National Workers Memorial was constructed with the idea that people attending would hear the sound of bells from the carillon, which would assist them in remembering their loved ones.

== Gallery ==
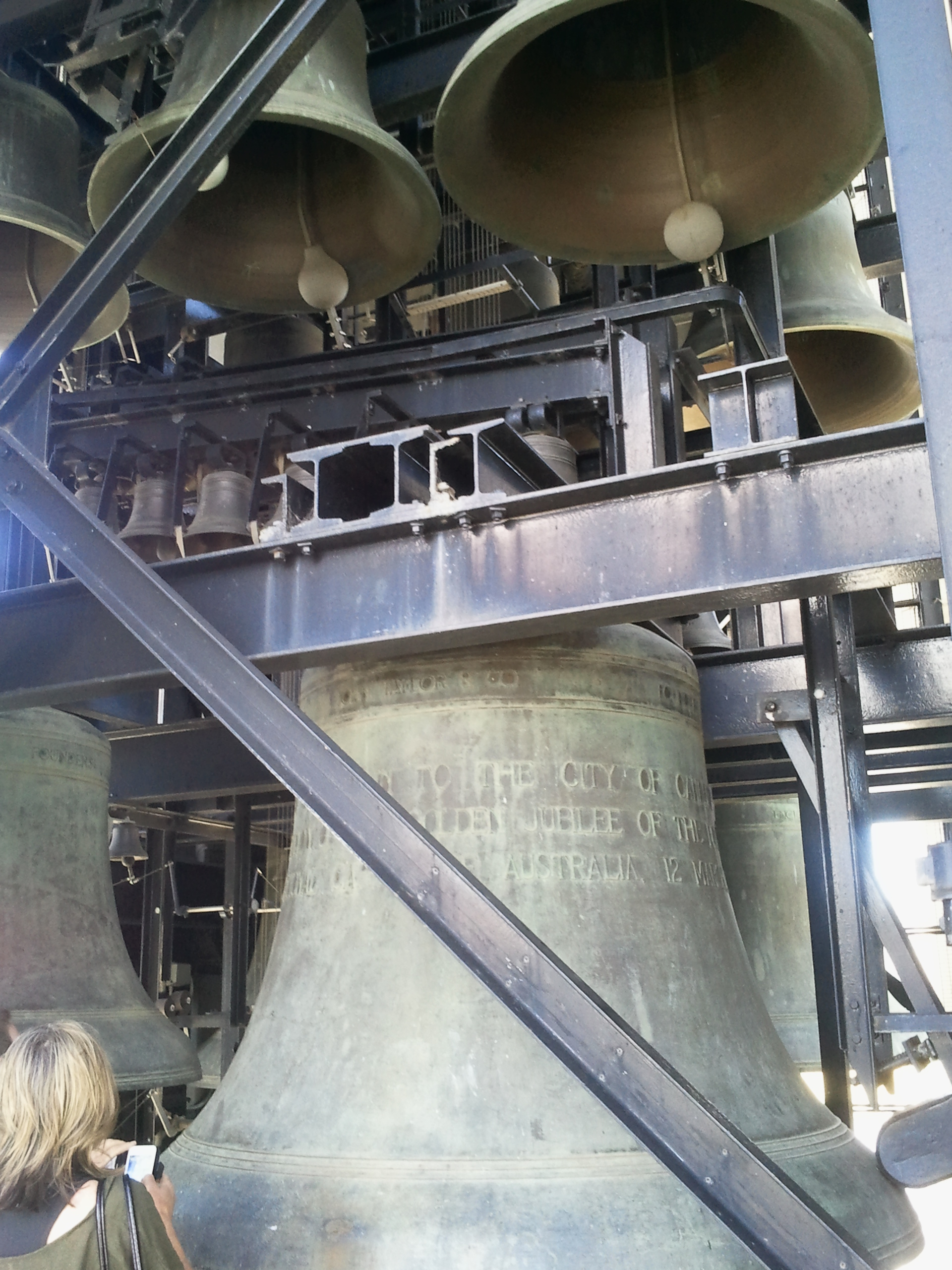
National Carillon bells

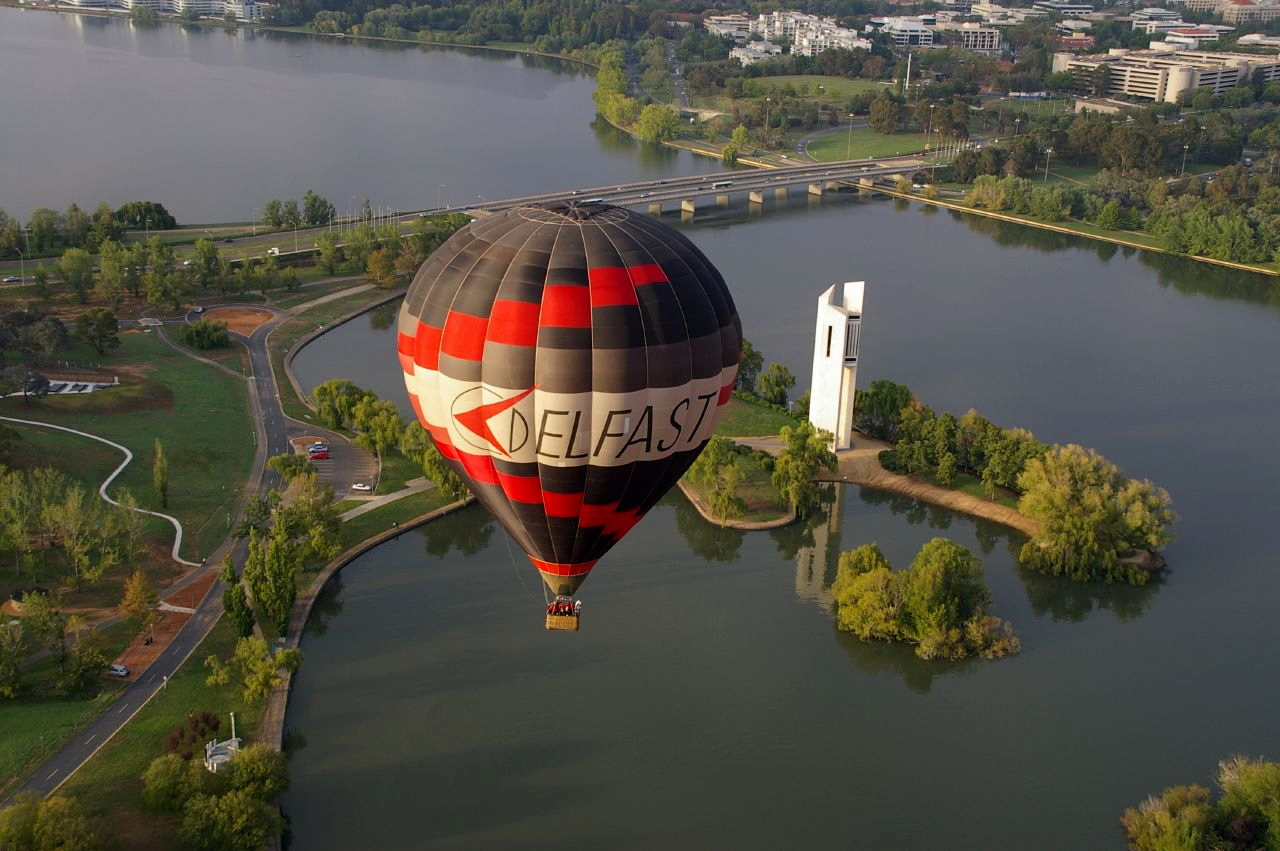
Hot air balloon over Lake Burley Griffin, showing the National Carillon

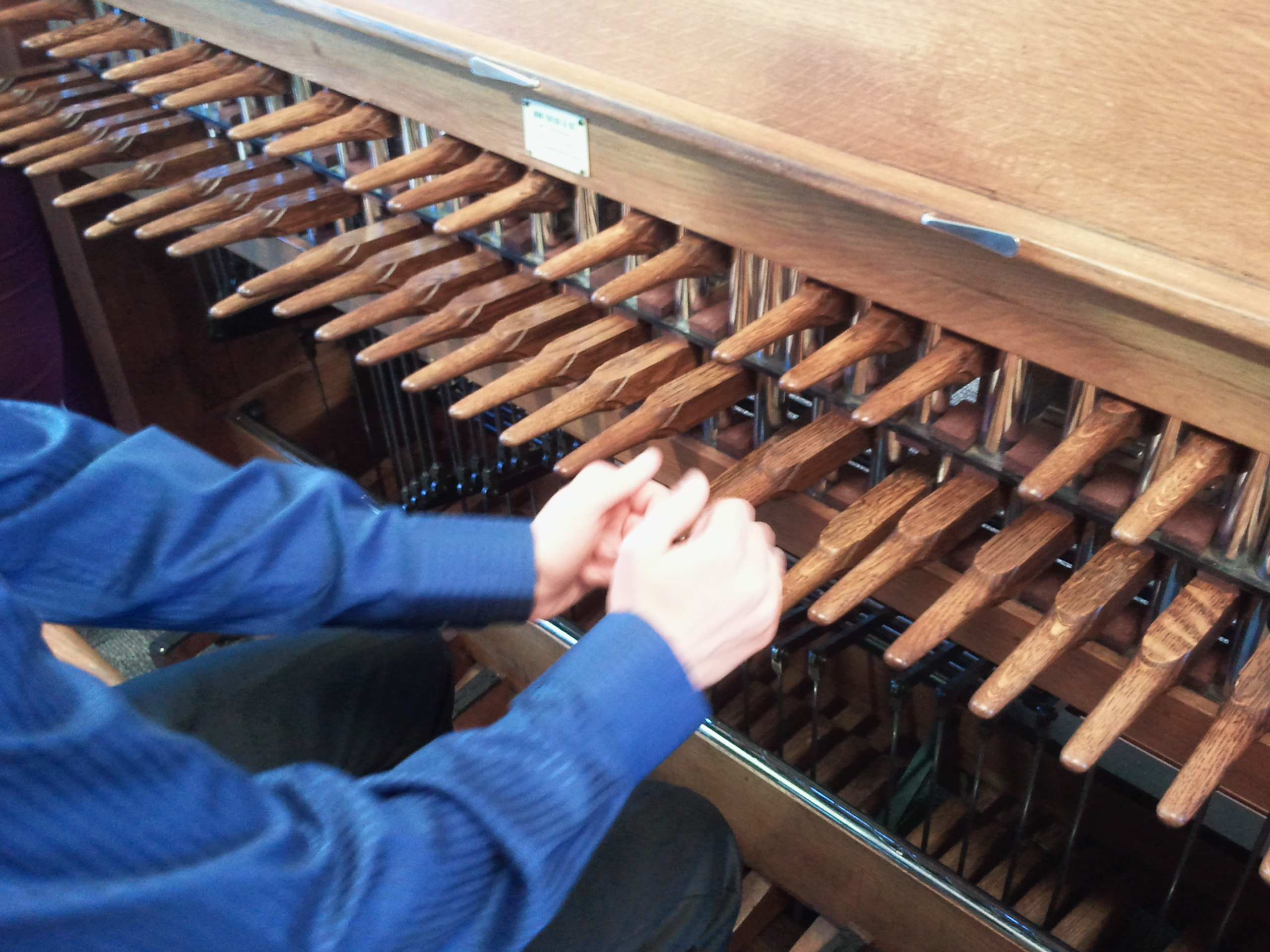
The carillon keyboard

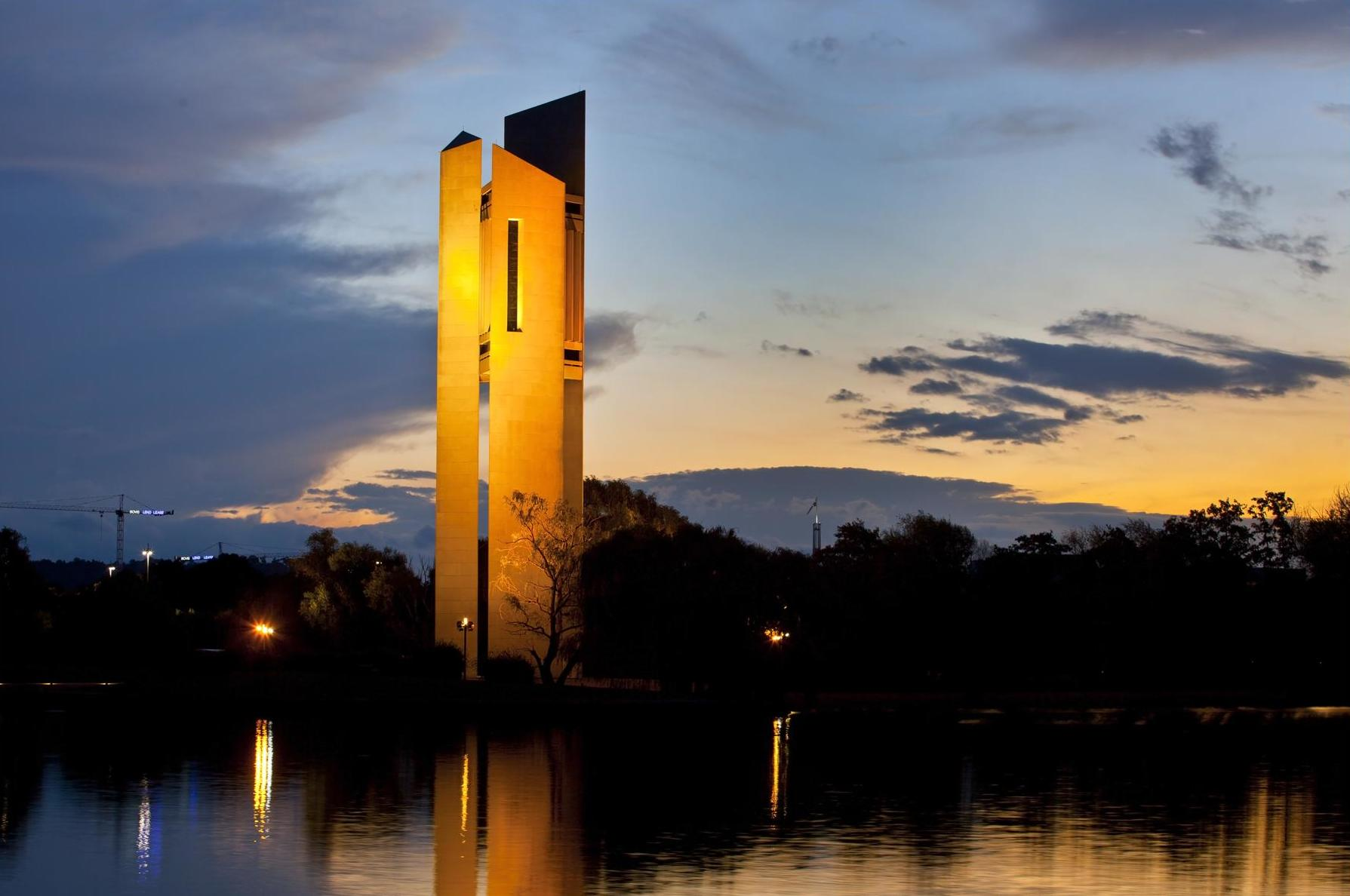
Carillon at sunset, 2011

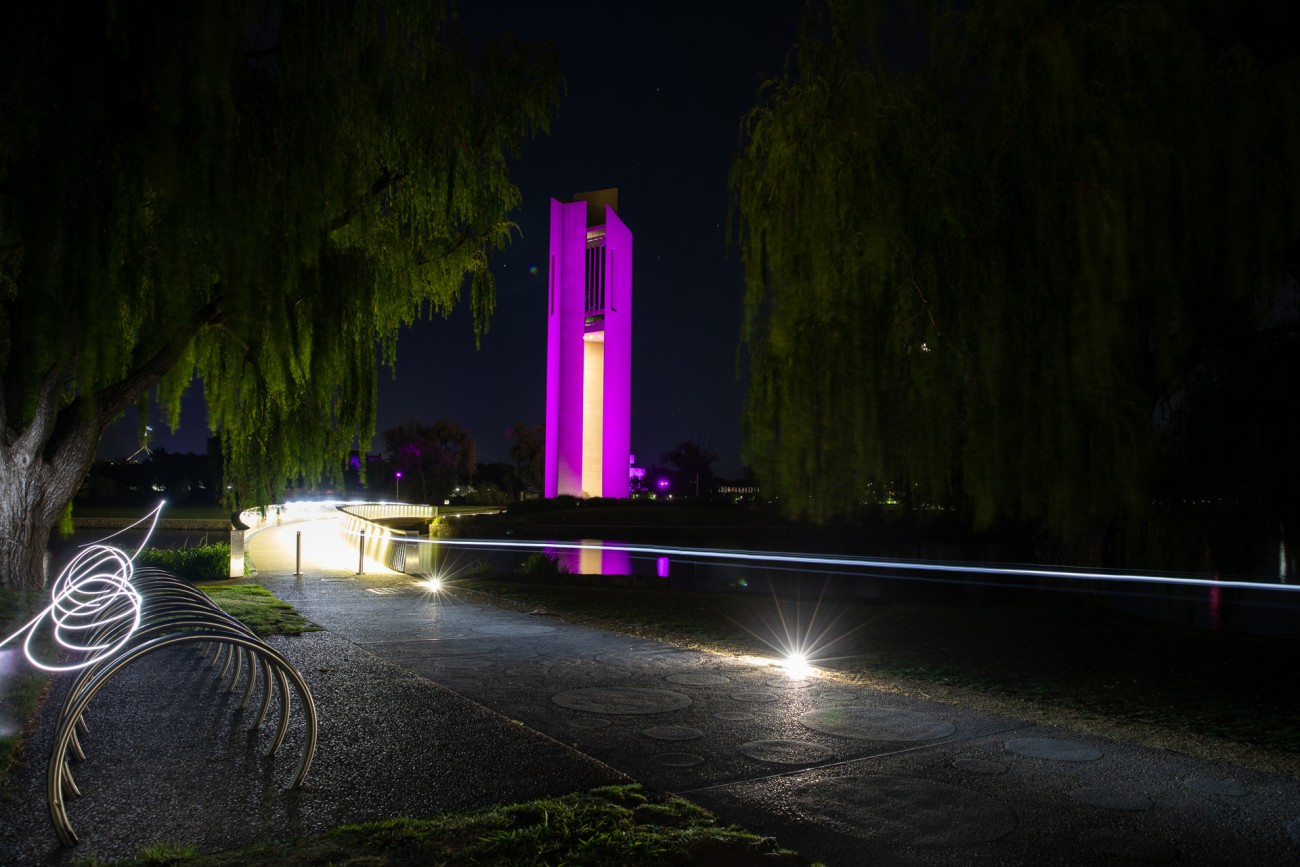
The National Carillon illuminated in royal purple for the Platinum Jubilee of Elizabeth II

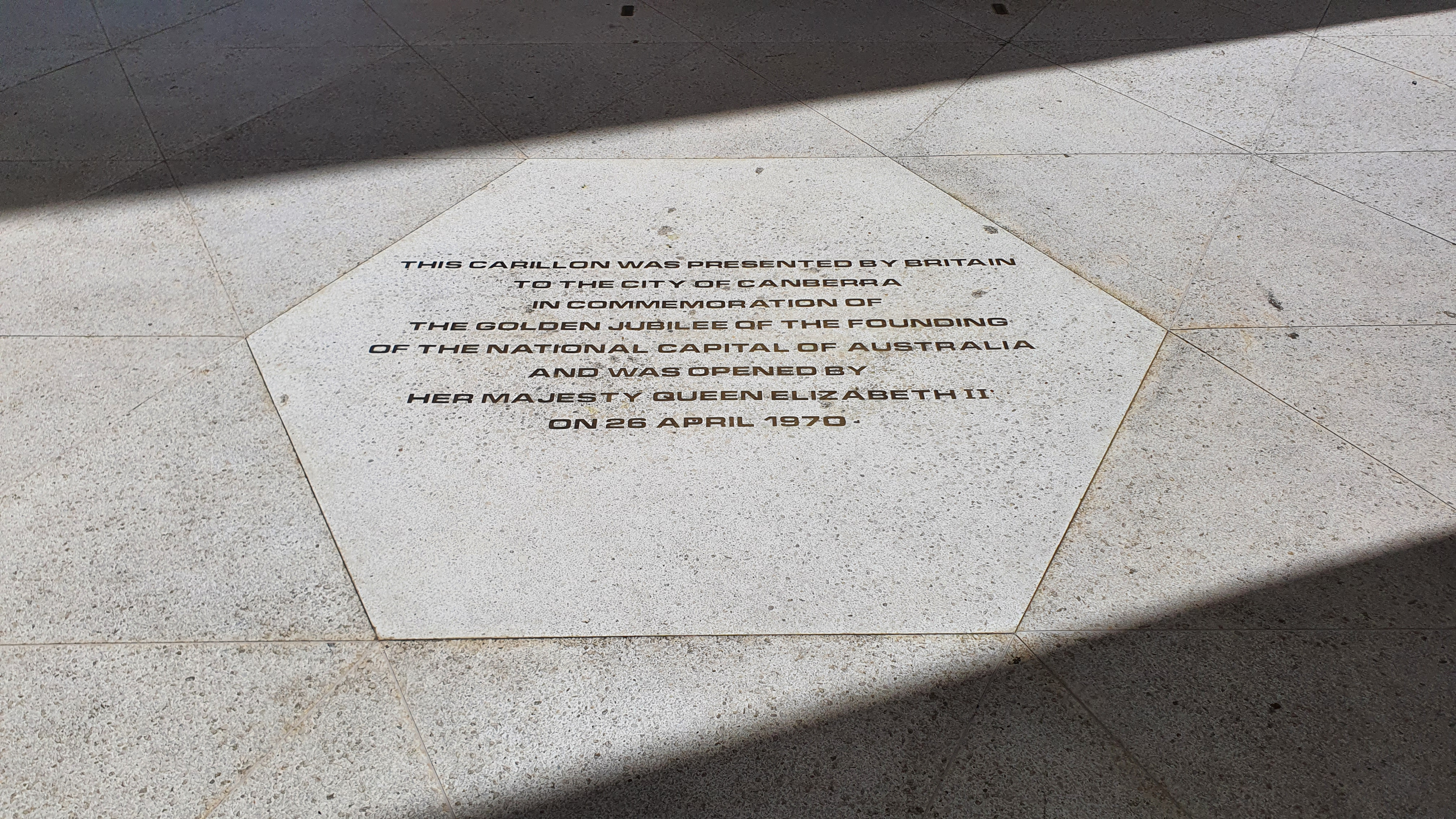
National Carilon Ground Sign

== See also ==
- List of carillons in Australia and New Zealand
- List of official openings by Elizabeth II in Australia
- Captain James Cook Memorial
