= History of Canadian currencies =

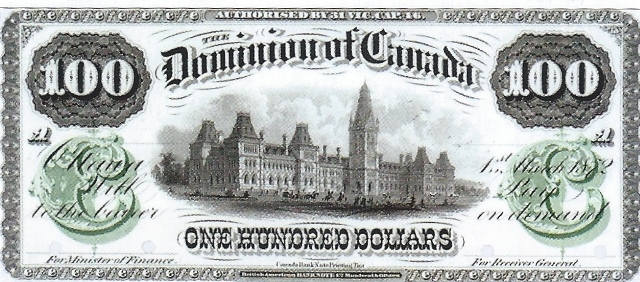
Illustration of Dominion of Canada $100 note, 1872, showing the old Centre Block of the Parliament of Canada

The history of Canadian currencies began with Indigenous peoples in Canada prior to European contact, when they used items such as wampum and furs for trading purposes. The Indigenous peoples continued to use those items as currency when trade with Europeans began. During the period of French colonization, coins were introduced, as well as one of the first examples of paper currency by a western government. During the period of British colonization, additional coinage was introduced, as well as banknotes. The Canadian colonies gradually moved away from the British pound and adopted currencies linked to the United States dollar. With Confederation in 1867, the Canadian dollar was established. By the mid-20th century, the Bank of Canada was the sole issuer of paper currency, and banks ceased to issue banknotes.

Canada began issuing its own coins shortly after Confederation. In the 20th century, Canada has issued many commemorative coins into circulation, temporarily replacing current coinage designs. There also exists a long history of numismatic coin issues.

== Indigenous peoples and trade ==
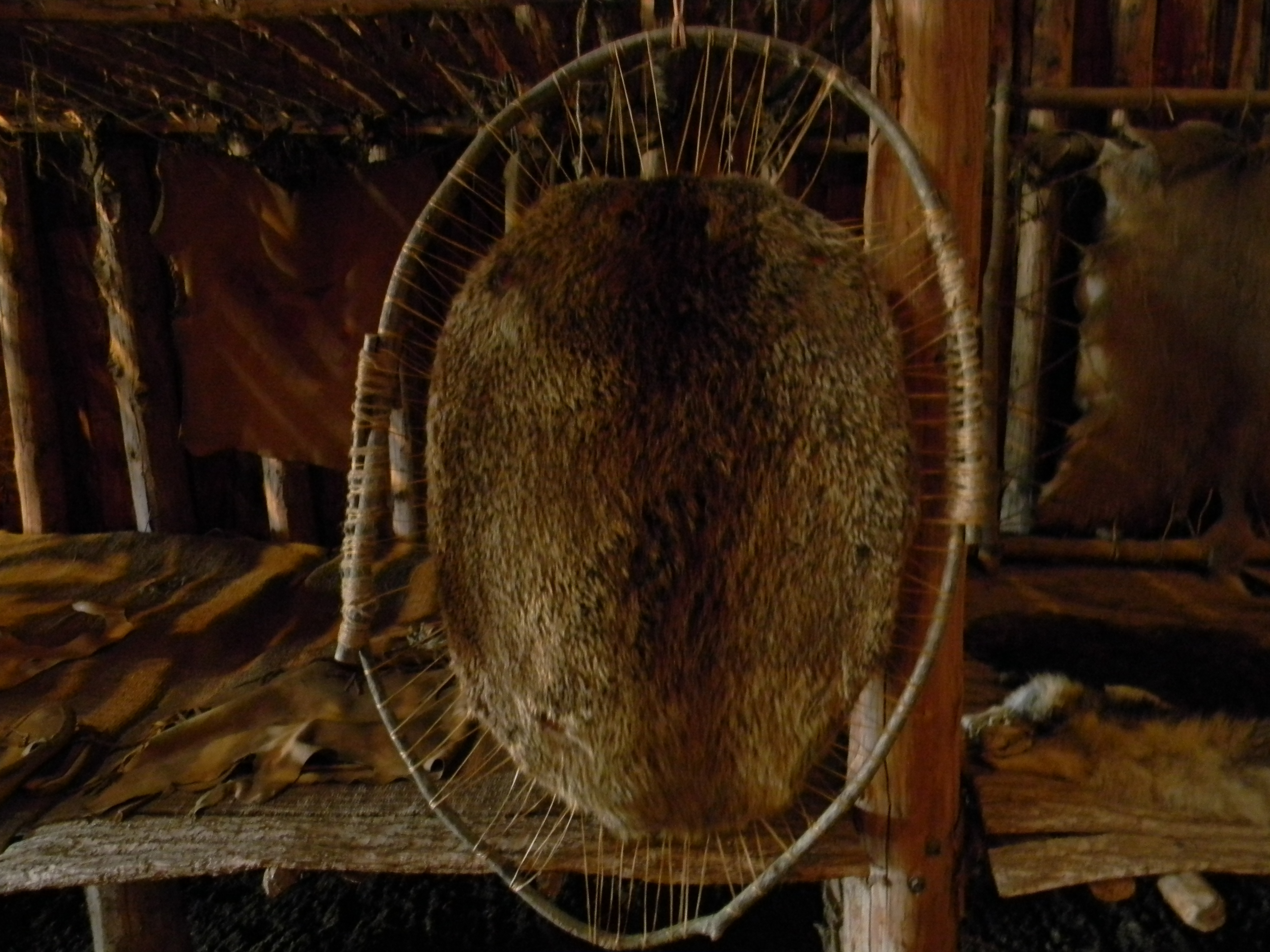
Beaver pelt in an Iroquois village

The original inhabitants of Canada were the First Nations and Inuit who traded in goods on a bartering basis. Various items played the role of currency, such as copper, wampum and beaver pelts. Wampum belts, made of numerous tiny shells, were used in eastern Canada to measure wealth and as gifts. Wampum belts were also used as currency during the early colonial period, and were recognised as legal tender in the early Dutch and British colonies.

Indigenous peoples also traded furs with Europeans for goods such as weapons, cloth, food, silver items, and tobacco. During the North American fur trade, the beaver pelt was universally accepted as a medium of exchange by Indigenous peoples and European traders alike, to the point that beaver pelts, called "Made Beavers", were used as a unit of account by the Hudson's Bay Company, to establish consistent pricing of all its trade goods.

The Ojibwe in eastern Canada were noted for mining and trade in copper. Objects such as copper shields had special economic and social value. The Haidas of the west coast used copper shields as a measure of status and wealth.

== New France: 1608–1763 ==
=== Chronic shortage of coins ===
With the foundation of Quebec in 1608, French settlement and trade began. The early French colonists bartered goods and also used French coins. The basic unit of currency was the denier or penny. Twelve deniers made a sol or sou, and twenty sols made a livre of New France. However, there was a recurring problem: there was never enough hard currency. Even though the French government sent silver coins from France, such as the "double tournois", the coins tended to be taken out of circulation by merchants, who used them to pay their taxes and buy European goods, as well as hoarding the coins for personal financial security. To deal with the shortage, the French government authorized the use of coins limited to New France, the monnoye du pays. These coins had an assigned value higher than coins used in France (the monnoye de France) but the New France coins were not successful because they had no value outside the colony. Spanish-American coins minted in Mexico, such as the piastre, would sometimes come in through secret trade. The colonial government adopted a practice of over-stamping these coins with a fleur-de-lys and a Roman numeral indicating the weight of silver, and thus value. The over-stamped coins were then permitted to circulate.

=== Playing card money ===
By 1685, the coin shortage had grown so severe that colonial authorities resorted to using playing cards as currency.

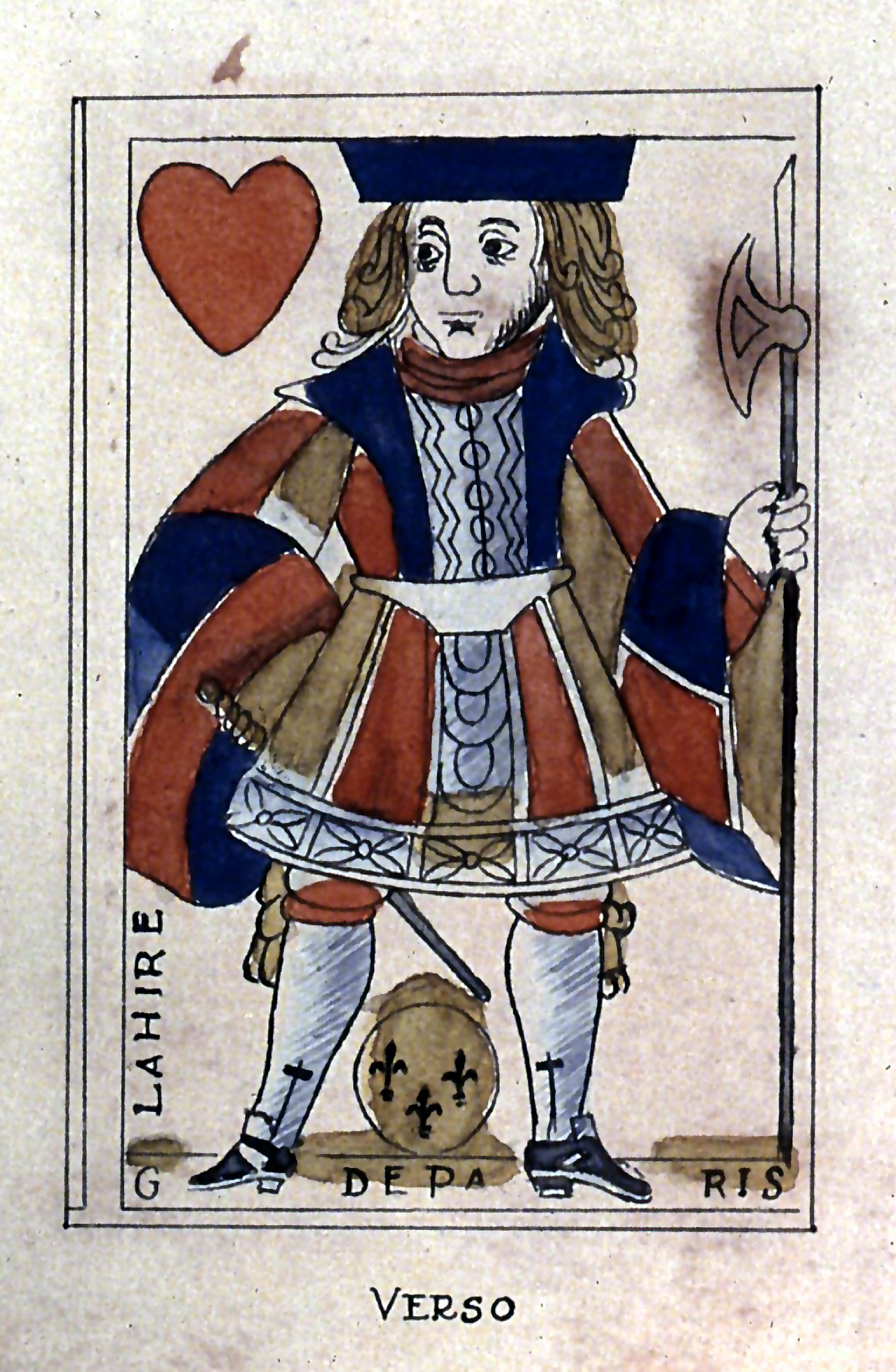
Reproduction of playing card used as money

The first issue of playing card money was by Intendant Jacques de Meulles. In 1685, he needed to pay soldiers for their services in a recent campaign. His funds, both government and personal, were exhausted, and he did not want to borrow money at the rate offered by merchants. Instead, he issued three denominations of playing card money (15 sols, 40 sols, and 4 livres). Playing cards were marked with the amount on the back and were given to soldiers as compensation. They were redeemed three months later, when more coins became available.

Although in the form of a promissory note, namely a promise by the colonial government to pay the soldiers when more coinage was available, the playing cards began to circulate as a medium of exchange. This was the first issue of paper money by a Western government. The card money did not meet with the approval of the French government, which was concerned that the cards were too easily counterfeited, and discouraged the colonial authorities from issuing the card money. Nonetheless, even when more coins did arrive from France, the cards continued to be used. The Intendant issued more card money the next year, 1686, with further issues in later years. The Governor, Louis de Buade de Frontenac, gradually saw the value of the paper currency and agreed to the expanded use, but as time went by, the use of card money contributed to a rise of inflation. In 1717, the colonial government withdrew all card money from circulation, redeeming the cards at 50% of their face value, and burning the cards.

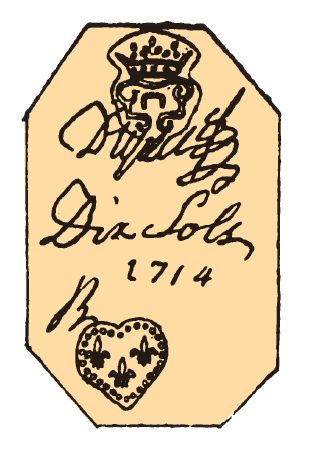
Reproduction of playing card money (10 sols)

The withdrawal of card money did not solve the problem of a chronic shortage of coinage. In 1722, the government introduced copper coins, but they were not well received. The lack of coinage contributed to a recession.

In 1729, the continued shortage of coinage led to the reintroduction of card money, this time with the approval of the French government. The amount of new card money was initially strictly controlled and the card money was redeemable as bills of exchange in France. This approach reduced the need to transport coinage across the Atlantic. Although referred to as "card money", this issue did not actually use playing cards, but rather plain card stock. The colonial government also issued promissory notes payable by the treasury, termed ordonnances de paiement which also circulated as currency. However, given the state of the French finances, the government relied increasingly on treasury bills to finance the wars. By 1760, the treasury notes totalled 30 million livres, and the amount of paper money circulating in the colony was fifteen times greater than in 1750.

The new card money and the ordonnances de paiement were initially successful. However, the gradual deterioration of the finances of the French government over the first half of the 18th century and the expenses of the Seven Years' War with Britain triggered a rapid increase in the amount of paper money in circulation in the 1750s. That in turn meant that inflation became a problem, as noted by Governor Montcalm in a dispatch to the French government. The declining confidence in the paper money meant coinage was increasingly hoarded, an application of Gresham's law. The paper money issued by the colonial government continued to depreciate, especially once the French government suspended redemption of the card money until after the end of the war with Britain.

=== French coinage ===
The French government continued to ship coinage to the colonies in the 18th century, such as the gold Louis d'or.

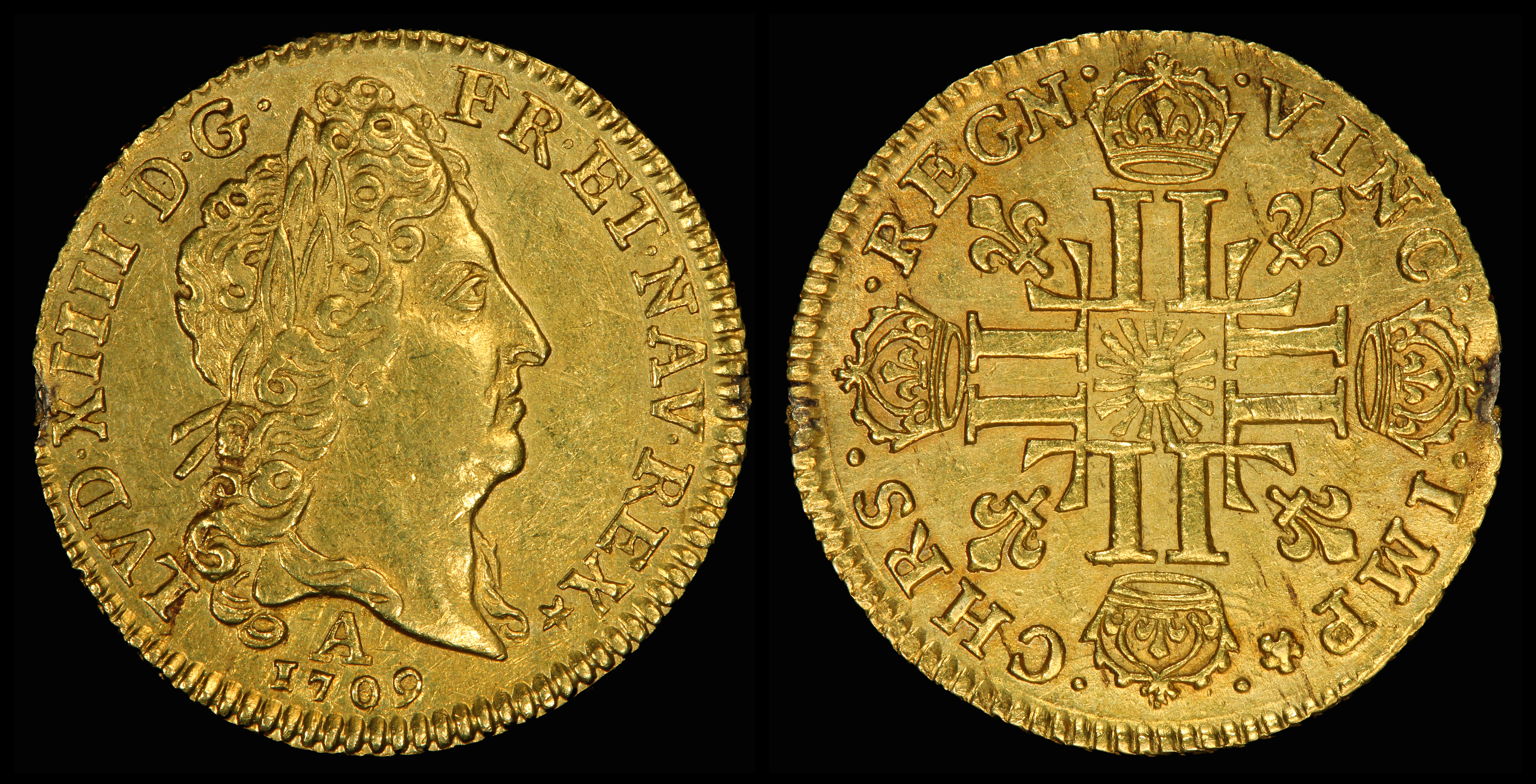
Louis d'or of Louis XIV (1709)

Although in short supply, French coinage continued to circulate in the 18th century, such as the 15- and 30-deniers. These gold coins, known as the mousquetaire, were meant to pay soldiers and civil servants but did not stay in circulation very long. The name is believed to have come from the cross on the reverse of the coins, which resembled the crosses on the cloaks of the legendary musketeers.

Another coinage that was used was the sol (sou). The sol was equivalent to the size of a 20th-century one-cent coin and was produced between 1738 and 1756. The Sol was rated at 12 deniers. The double sol was produced until 1764, although large shipments to Quebec and Cape Breton ended in 1756. The double sol was rated at 24 deniers.

=== End of French rule ===
French rule came to an end with the conquest of Quebec by the British in 1760. The value of the card money and the ordonnances de paiement plummeted, since their value had come from the promise by the French government that they could be redeemed for coinage. Under the Treaty of Paris, 1763, the French government agreed to continue to redeem the paper money, and three years later introduced a series of government debentures to replace the paper money. However, the state of France's government finances was poor, and by 1771 the debentures were essentially worthless. After New France fell, the card money and ordonnances were redeemed at only one-quarter of their face value. As a result, the habitants of Quebec were left with a deep distrust of paper money which lasted for generations.

== British colonial rule: 1760–1825 ==
=== Shortage of currency ===
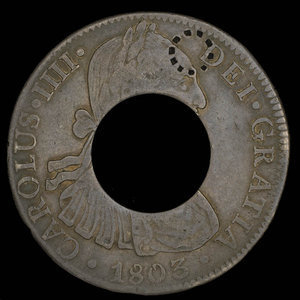
Prince Edward Island "holey dollar"

The shortage of currency continued under British rule. Although historical economists disagree on the reasons for the shortage, the effect was that a wide variety of foreign coinage and paper instruments, such as colonial Treasury bills and notes from different merchants, were used in commercial transactions. One account from Nova Scotia in 1820 illustrates the confusion caused by the lack of unified currency: a customer in a market bought vegetables costing six pence, and paid with a £1 Nova Scotian Treasury note. His change back consisted of ninety-three separate items: eight paper notes from different merchants, ranging in value from 5 shillings to 7 1/2 pence; one silver coin; and eighty-four copper coins.

Colonial governments could be imaginative in domesticating foreign currencies. For example, in 1808, officials in Prince Edward Island punched out the centres of Spanish-American dollars, creating the "holey dollar". The two pieces were each used as coins, with values of one shilling and five shillings.

=== Units of account and rating systems ===
Because of the variety of currencies that were used, two measures were needed for order and consistency in financial accounting: units of account and "ratings" system. By general agreement, all accounts were usually kept in one currency, and coins and bills from other systems were notionally converted to that system for bookkeeping purposes. That step required a generally accepted conversion system, or "rating" of other currencies, typically based on their weight and the value of the precious metal they contained. The colonies all initially used the British system of "Pounds, shillings and pence" as the unit of account, but there was variation in the rating system. Each colonial government established rating systems to value the wide variety of foreign currencies that came into use.

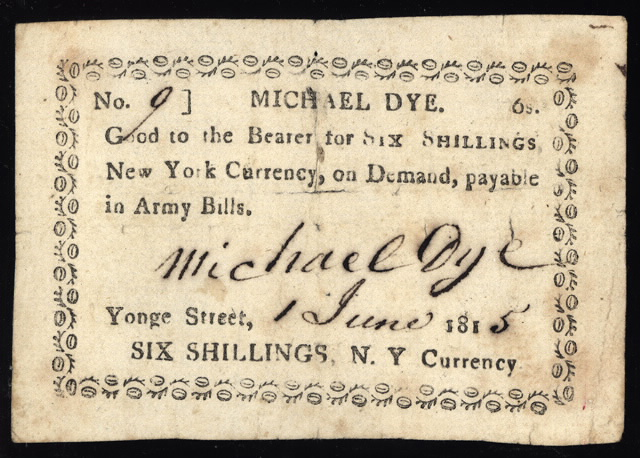
Six shilling note in York currency, issued by Michael Dye, an innkeeper in Toronto in 1815

The two most important rating systems were the Halifax rating and the York rating. The Halifax rating set the value of a Spanish dollar at five shillings. This value was actually six pence higher than the value of the Spanish dollar at that time. The higher rating was chosen to encourage the continued circulation of the Spanish dollar and to discourage people from melting the dollars down for their bullion value. The Halifax rating came into use shortly after the colony of Nova Scotia was established in 1749, and was confirmed by a statute of the Legislature of Nova Scotia in 1758. Although the British government disallowed the Nova Scotia legislation, the Halifax rating continued to be widely used in the Maritime colonies and eventually in Lower Canada.

The York rating was named after New York, where it had been adopted during the colonial period. The York rating set the value of a Spanish dollar at eight shillings. The York rating was introduced in Upper Canada by United Empire Loyalists. Although Upper Canada formally adopted the Halifax rating by legislation in 1796, the York rating continued to be used, apparently up until the union of Upper and Lower Canada in the Province of Canada in 1841.

=== Government treasury bills ===
Colonial governments began to experiment in paper treasury bills, often when needed to finance government expenses. The first Canadian colony to do so was Prince Edward Island (at that time known as the Island of St. John). In 1790, the colonial government issued £500 in treasury notes, in values up to £2. New Brunswick, Nova Scotia, Newfoundland and Prince Edward Island all issued treasury bills in the early years of the 19th century.

During the War of 1812, the British Army issued a series of "Army bills", redeemable for government bills of exchange at London, with eventually £1.5 million issued. All of those bills were redeemed in currency by 1816, which helped build confidence in government paper money.

The Colony of British Columbia also issued paper money in the 1850s, denominated in pounds and later in dollars.

=== Banks and bank notes ===
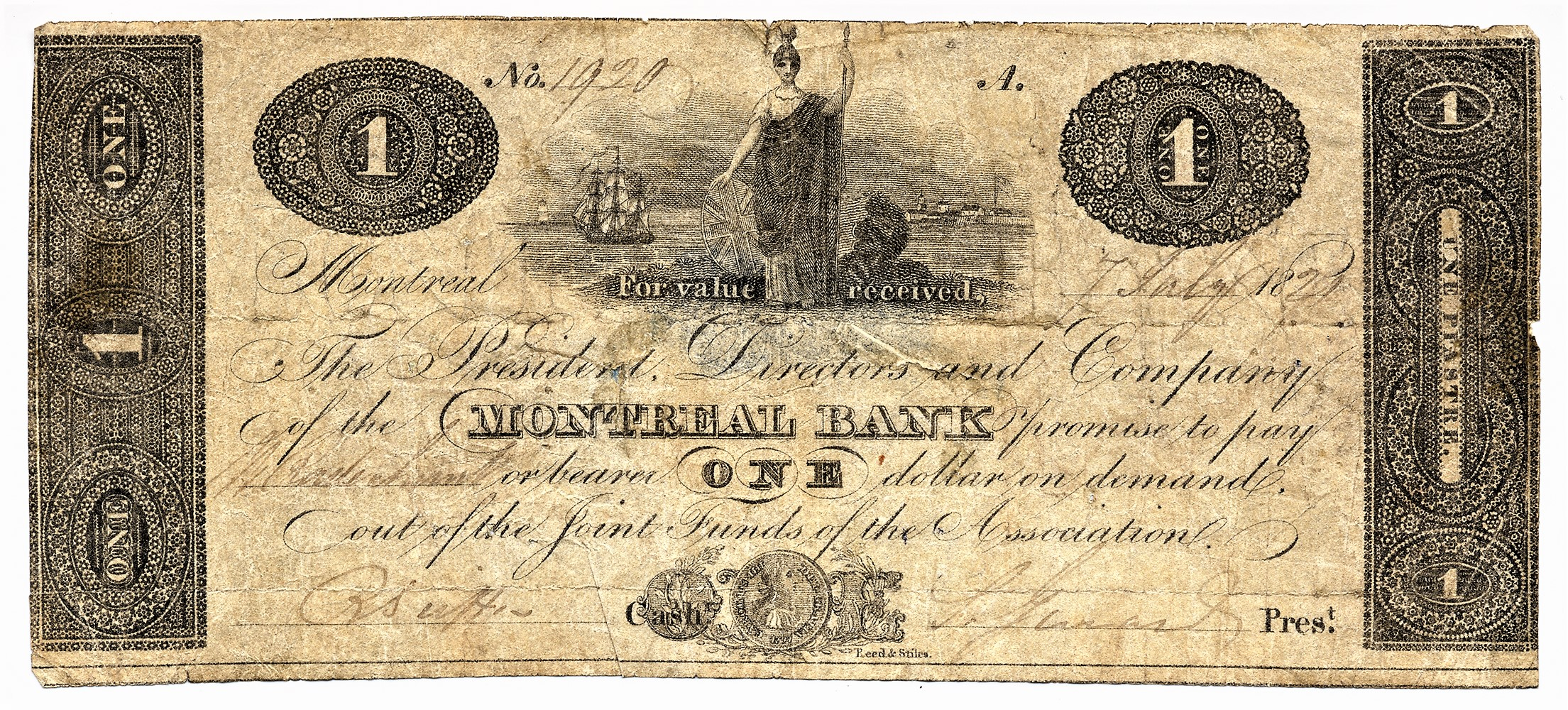
One-dollar banknote of the Montreal Bank, 1821

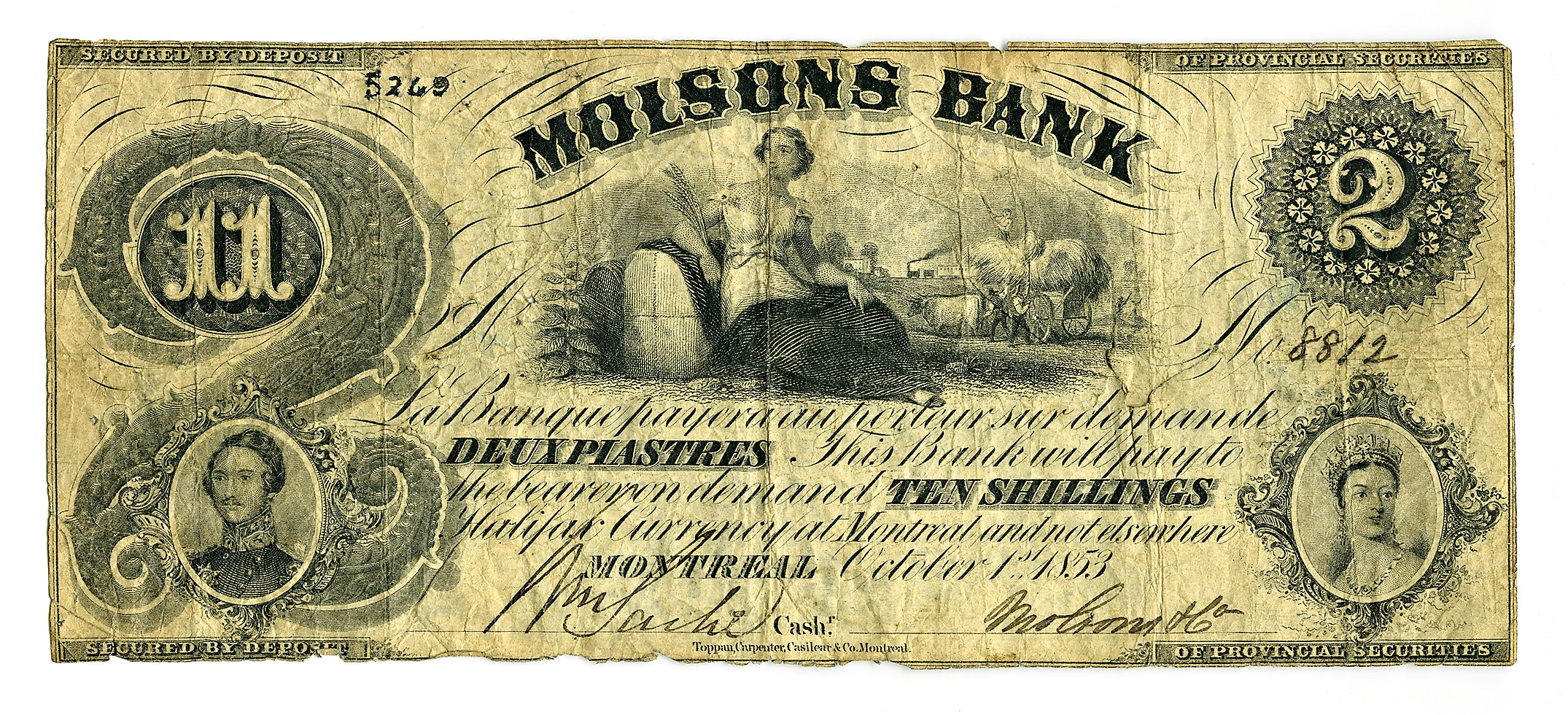
Note of the Molson Bank for deux piasters / ten shillings, 1853

As the level of commercial sophistication rose in the colonies, banks began to be founded. The banks then began to issue bank notes, with the first from the Montreal Bank (now the Bank of Montreal) in 1817, shortly after it was incorporated. Other banks, such as the Bank of Upper Canada, the Bank of New Brunswick, the Bank of Nova Scotia and the Bank of Prince Edward Island, followed suit, issuing their own bank notes.

The right to issue bank notes was a valuable one. The notes amounted to an interest-free loan to the bank, which only became due if the holder of a note presented it to the bank to redeem it in coinage. The bank notes were only redeemable at the branches of the bank which issued them. Although the bank notes were generally well received by the populace, they could trade at a discount when they were far away from a bank branch where they could be redeemed.

The notes issued by banks in Upper and Lower Canada tended to be denominated in both pounds and dollars, while the bank notes in the Atlantic provinces tended to be in pounds only. This difference reflected the greater commercial ties which Upper and Lower Canada had with the United States, while the Atlantic colonies mainly traded with Britain, less with the United States.

Some merchants also issued paper notes which exchanged as currency. In Lower Canada, they were often referred to as "Bons", from the opening words "Bon pour", French for "Good for".

=== Tokens ===
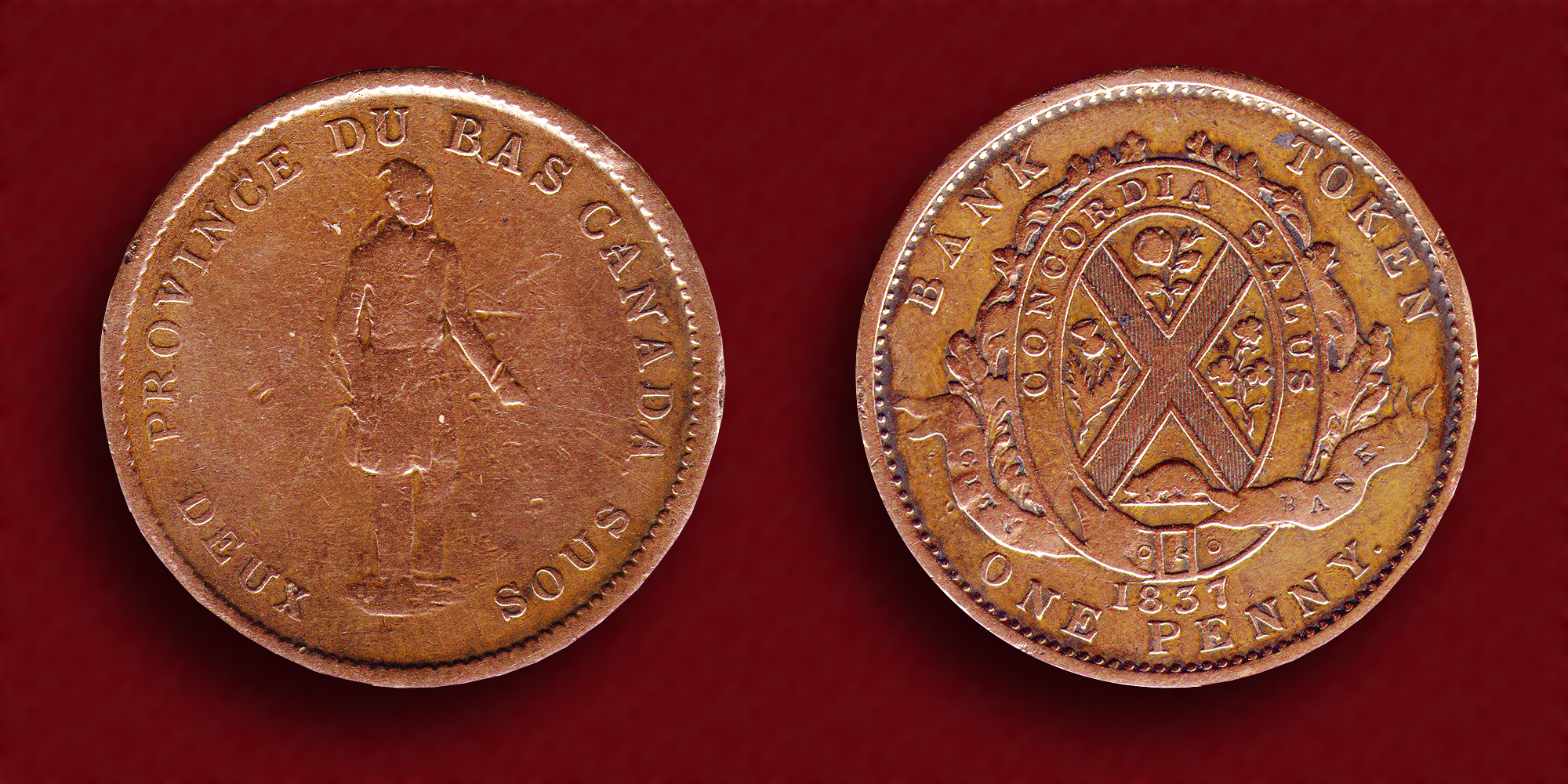
Lower Canada bank token for one penny / two sous, a Habitant token, nicknamed a "Papineau", from 1837

In addition to issuing bank notes, some banks as well as merchants began to issue trade tokens. Although they had no legal status, they were accepted as currency on a local basis. The tokens were mainly imported from England. The banks in Lower Canada cooperated in issuing tokens to improve their reliability. One of the tokens they produced had the arms of Montreal on one side, and an image of a habitant on the other. These tokens were nicknamed "Papineaus", named after Louis-Joseph Papineau, who was the leader of the 1837 rebellion in Lower Canada and who was well known for wearing habitant clothing almost as uniform. These tokens are more commonly known today as Habitant tokens.

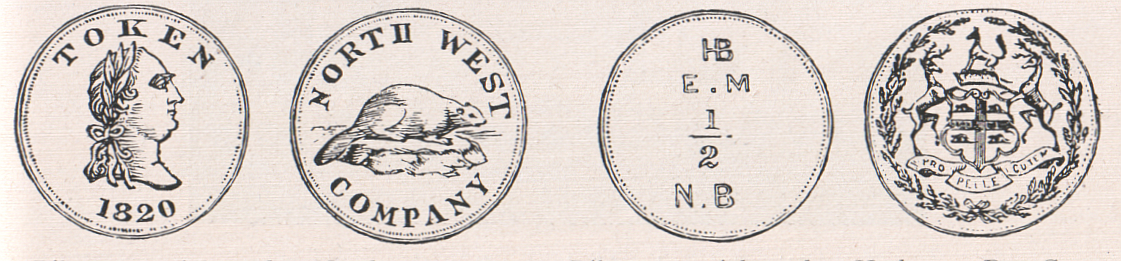
Illustrations of trade tokens of the North West Company and the Hudson's Bay Company

The two major fur-trading companies, the Hudson's Bay Company and the North West Company also issued trade tokens, which were used in their extensive trading networks. The Hudson's Bay Company tokens were based on the "Made beaver" pelts which had been used as a medium of exchange.

== From the British pound to the Canadian dollar: 1825–1867 ==
During the mid-19th century, there was a policy disagreement between the British and the colonial governments. The British wanted all the colonies to continue to use sterling, to facilitate trade within the Empire. The Canadian colonies, both in the east and British Columbia, increasingly favoured linking their currencies to the US dollar, given the strong local trade links. Eventually, the local trade won out and the Canadian colonies migrated to currencies linked to the US dollar.

One feature of the regulation of coinage at this time was fixed exchange rates. The colonial and imperial legislation set fixed exchange rates for coins, often based on their weight as bullion.

=== British Order-in-council of 1825 ===
The issue first arose in 1825, when the British government passed an imperial Order-in-council which was designed to encourage the circulation of sterling coinage throughout the British Empire, including the Canadian colonies. The Order-in-council actually had the reverse effect in the Canadas, driving out what little sterling specie coinage did actually circulate. This was because the rating of one Spanish dollar to four shillings and four pence sterling that was contained in the order-in-council did not represent a realistic comparison between the silver content in the Spanish dollar as compared to the gold content in the British gold sovereign. When Britain passed remedial legislation in 1838, the British North American colonies were excluded from its provisions due to recent rebellions in Upper and Lower Canada.

=== Colonial pounds ===
Each of the colonies had their own currencies. Although modelled on the British system of pounds-shillings-pence, the exact value of each currency could vary, depending on the legislation of each colony. There was the Canadian pound, used in Upper and Lower Canada, and then the Province of Canada; the New Brunswick pound; the Newfoundland pound; the Nova Scotian pound; and the Prince Edward Island pound. They were all gradually replaced with decimal systems of currency linked to the US and Spanish dollars.

=== Province of Canada pound, 1841 ===
Following the union, the Province of Canada adopted a new system based on the Halifax rating. The provincial legislation set exchange rates for a new Canadian pound: one pound, four shillings and four pence Canadian was equal to one pound sterling. Described the other way, the new Canadian pound was worth sixteen shillings, five and three-tenths pence sterling. The legislation also set the rate for the new Canadian pound against the US dollar, setting the legal tender value of the American gold eagle at two pounds, ten shillings Canadian (i.e. the Canadian pound was worth four US dollars). The legislation also set the exchange rates for the Canadian pound against the French franc, the old Spanish, Mexican and Chilean doubloons, and other Latin American currencies. British currency, US gold and silver coins, and Spanish dollars were all considered legal tender.

=== Movement towards the dollar and decimal currency ===
Throughout the 1850s, the imperial and colonial governments debated the issue of colonial currency. The imperial government favoured a system where all colonies used currency based on sterling, which could be either British currency or local colonial currency tied to sterling, including a decimalised currency. The colonial governments increasingly favoured a decimal monetary system based on the United States dollar, because of the practical implications of the increasing trade with the neighbouring United States.

In June 1851, representatives of the Province of Canada, New Brunswick and Nova Scotia met in Toronto to discuss the introduction of a joint decimal currency. The Government in London agreed in principle to a decimal coinage but held out the hope that the colonies would adopt a sterling unit under the name 'Royal'.

==== Province of Canada ====
Following the 1851 conference, the government of the Province of Canada under the leadership of Co-Premier Francis Hincks began to move towards decimal currency. The provincial Parliament passed an act to introduce a pound sterling unit in conjunction with decimal fractional coinage. The idea was that the fractional values would correspond to exact values of fractions of the US dollar. The Preamble to the statute expressed the hope that the decimal currency could "...hereafter be advantageously made common to all the Provinces of British North America, as being simple and convenient in itself, and well calculated to facilitate their commercial intercourse with other parts of this continent". The authorities in London delayed implementation of the act on technical grounds. A related statute passed in the same session continued the statutory exchange rates for British and US currency used in Canada.

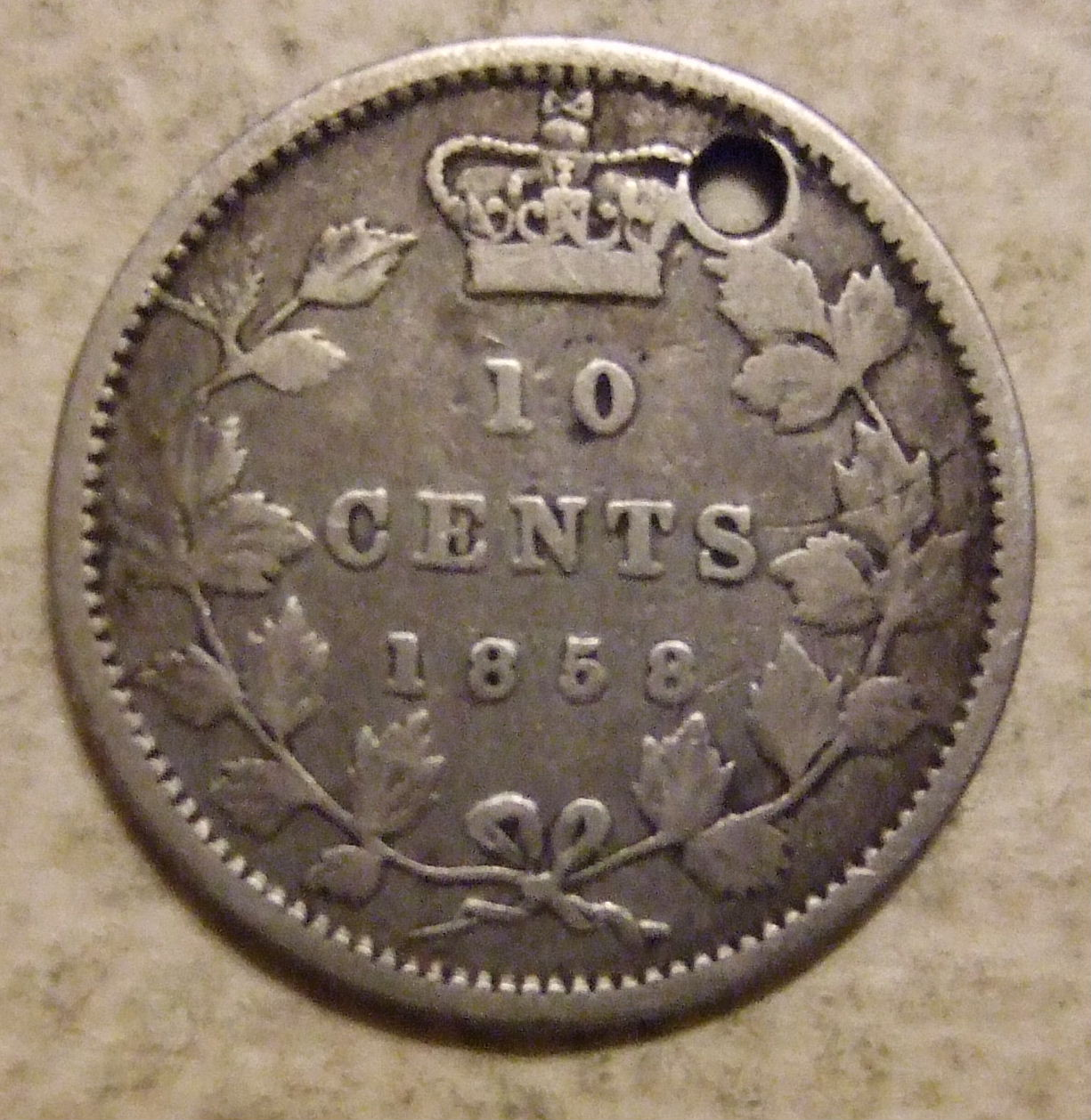
Province of Canada's first ten-cent coin, 1858

As a compromise between basing the currency on sterling or on the US dollar, in 1853 the Parliament of the Province of Canada enacted a statute to introduce the gold standard into the province, based on both the British gold sovereign and the American gold eagle coins. The gold sovereign was legal tender at a rating of £1 equal to $4.8666 Canadian, and the $10 eagle was rated at $10 Canadian. No coinage was provided for under the 1853 act. Sterling coinage was made legal tender, and all other silver coins were demonetized, although they continued to circulate. Dollar transactions were legalized. Since the New Brunswick and Canadian statutes had adopted the same conversion rates, their two currencies were now compatible, fixed at par with the US dollar.

The trend towards decimalization continued, and in 1857 the Province of Canada provided that all public accounts were to be kept in dollars and cents. The next year, 1858, the first Canadian decimal coins were released. Minted at the Royal Mint in London, they were issued in the name of "Canada", with an effigy of Queen Victoria on the obverse. The coins were in denominations of one-cent, five-cents, ten-cents, twenty-cents and fifty-cents.

==== New Brunswick ====
In 1852, the year following the Toronto conference, New Brunswick passed a similar statute as the Canadian statute, establishing "pounds, shillings and pence" as the government unit of account, but also setting both British coinage and US coinage as legal tender. The statute also authorized the provincial government to obtain a new supply of coins. New Brunswick ordered a supply of coins from the Royal Mint in London in 1860, but because of the demand faced by the Mint, the first shipment of New Brunswick coins did not arrive until 1862.

==== Nova Scotia ====
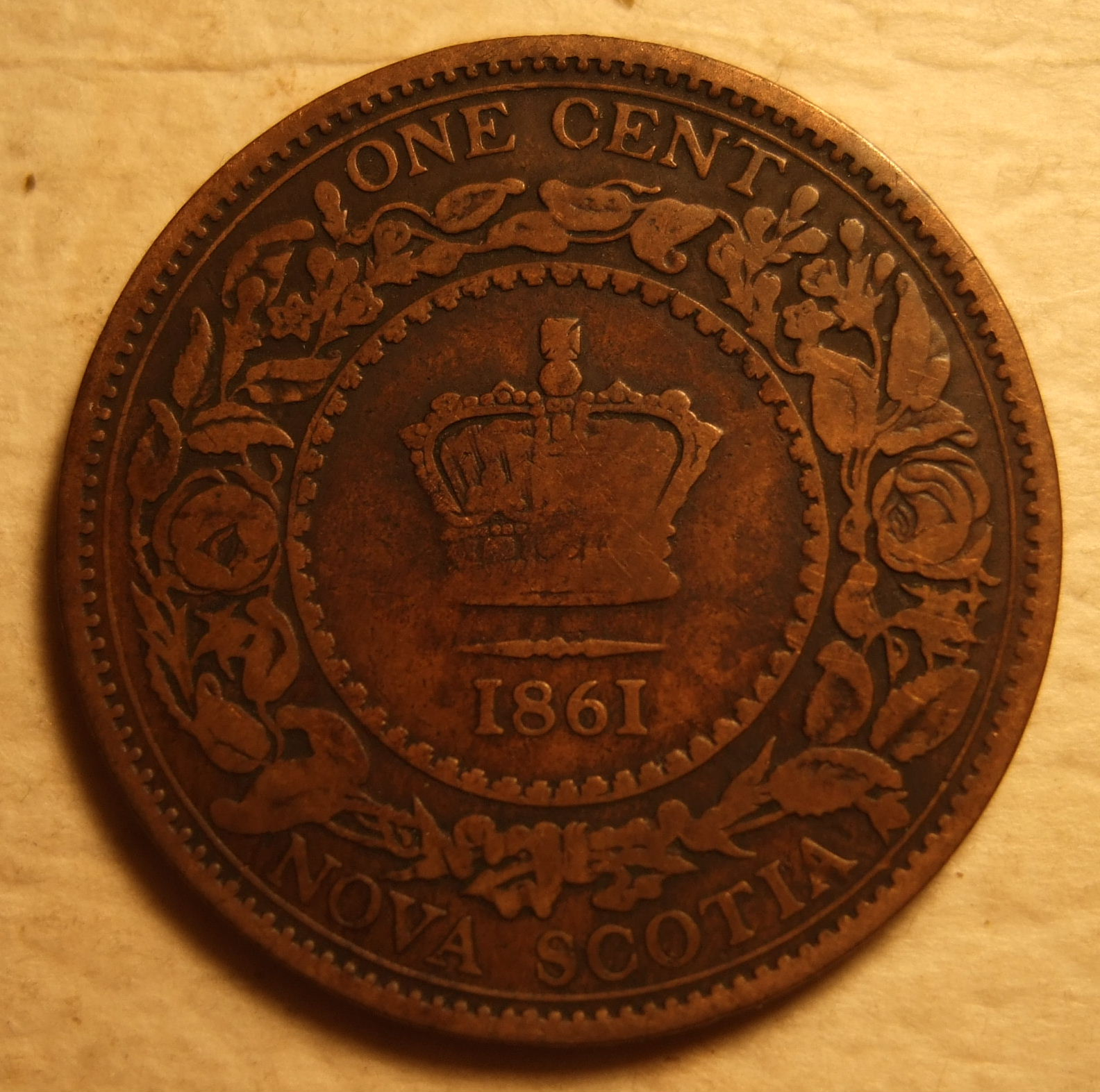
Nova Scotia one-cent coin, 1861

In 1860, Nova Scotia adopted a system of decimalization, and set the exchange rates for British currency as well as other coins. The provincial government was authorised to obtain coins in cents, and the unit of account for the government was to be in dollars and cents. All court judgments were to be issued in dollars and cents. However, since the Nova Scotia legislation set the exchange rate as £1 equal to $5, the Nova Scotia system was not compatible with the Canadian and New Brunswick systems, which gave a slightly lower value to the pound. Nova Scotia also ordered coins from the Royal Mint in 1860, but like New Brunswick, the first shipment of Nova Scotia coins did not arrive until 1862.

==== Newfoundland ====
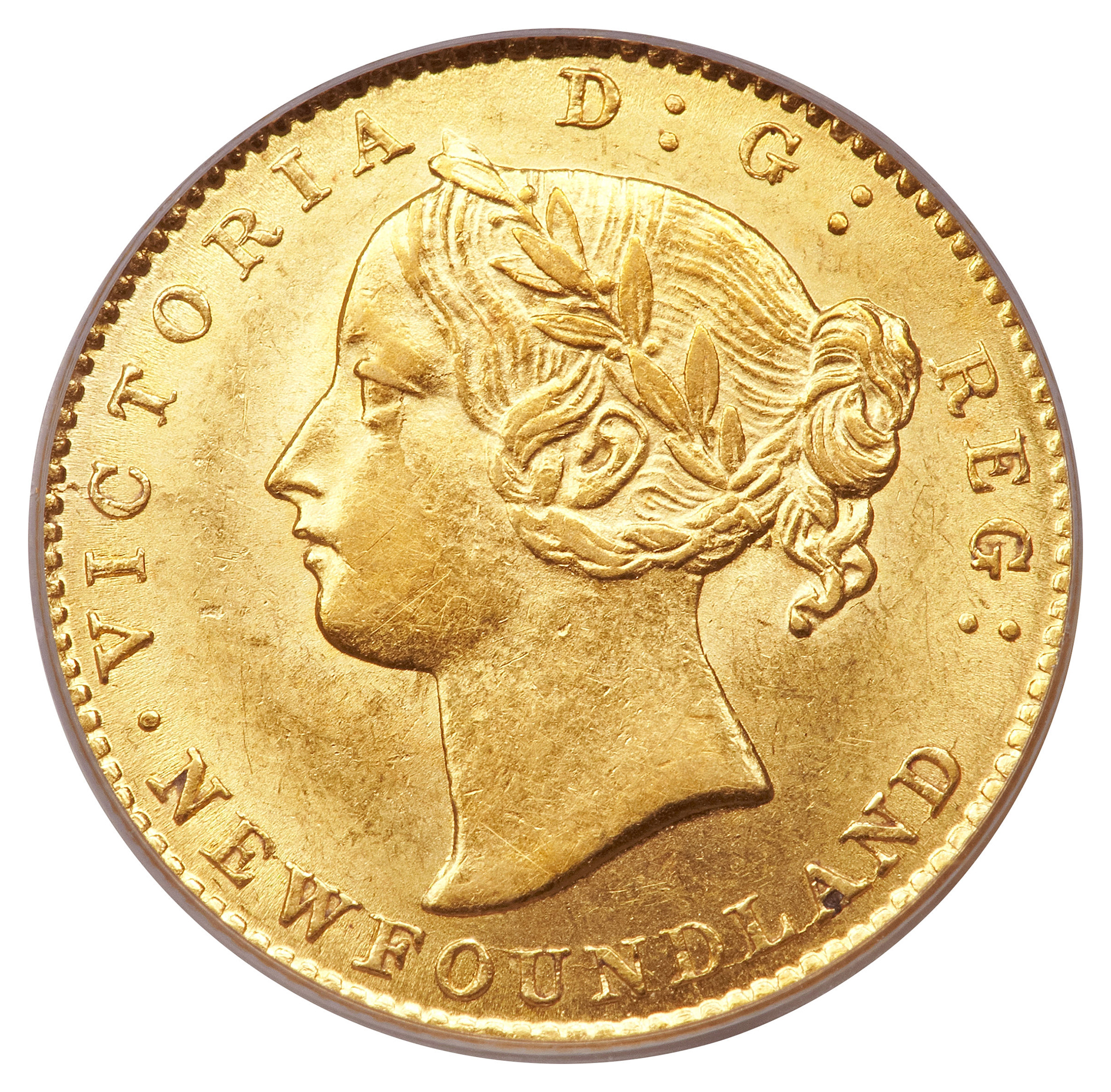
Newfoundland two-dollar gold coin, 1870

Prior to 1865, Newfoundland used the Newfoundland pound, equal in value to the pound sterling. In 1865, Newfoundland switched to a decimal system, the Newfoundland dollar, and started to release its own coinage, in denominations of one-cent, five-cent, ten-cent, twenty-cent and two-dollar coins. The Newfoundland decimal coinage represented fractions of the Spanish dollar that was used in British Guiana. This had the benefit of making one penny sterling exactly equal to two new Newfoundland cents, which was seen as a compromise between those who wanted Newfoundland to adopt the British system and those who wanted Newfoundland to adopt the United States system. However, it meant that the Newfoundland dollar was worth slightly more than the Canadian dollar (one Newfoundland dollar was worth 1.014 Canadian dollars), so the Newfoundland and Canadian currencies were not easily convertible.

Although the Newfoundland government issued coinage, it left the issue of bank notes to the two private banks in Newfoundland: the Union Bank and the Commercial Bank. By the late 19th century, both of those banks were badly managed and in very weak financial condition. When there was a downturn in the cod industry, the banks failed on Monday, December 10, 1894, known as Black Monday. Both banks closed their doors permanently that day and their notes became worthless, triggering a financial crisis on the island. The Government of Newfoundland passed legislation guaranteeing payment on the bank notes of the two insolvent banks, but at depreciated values. The Government also introduced legislation to set the value of the Newfoundland dollar the same as the Canadian dollar. Canadian banks moved in quickly following the crash, in 1894 and early 1895. The net effect was that the Newfoundland monetary system became integrated with the Canadian system.

==== British Columbia ====
In 1867, the Colony of British Columbia enacted a statute to implement decimal currency based on the United States dollar. The statute provided that all government accounts would be kept in dollars and cents and established rates of exchange for the various coins then in circulation, at the rate of £1 equal to $4.85. The legislation repealed similar legislation enacted a few years earlier by the former colonies of Vancouver Island and British Columbia prior to their union.

==== Prince Edward Island ====
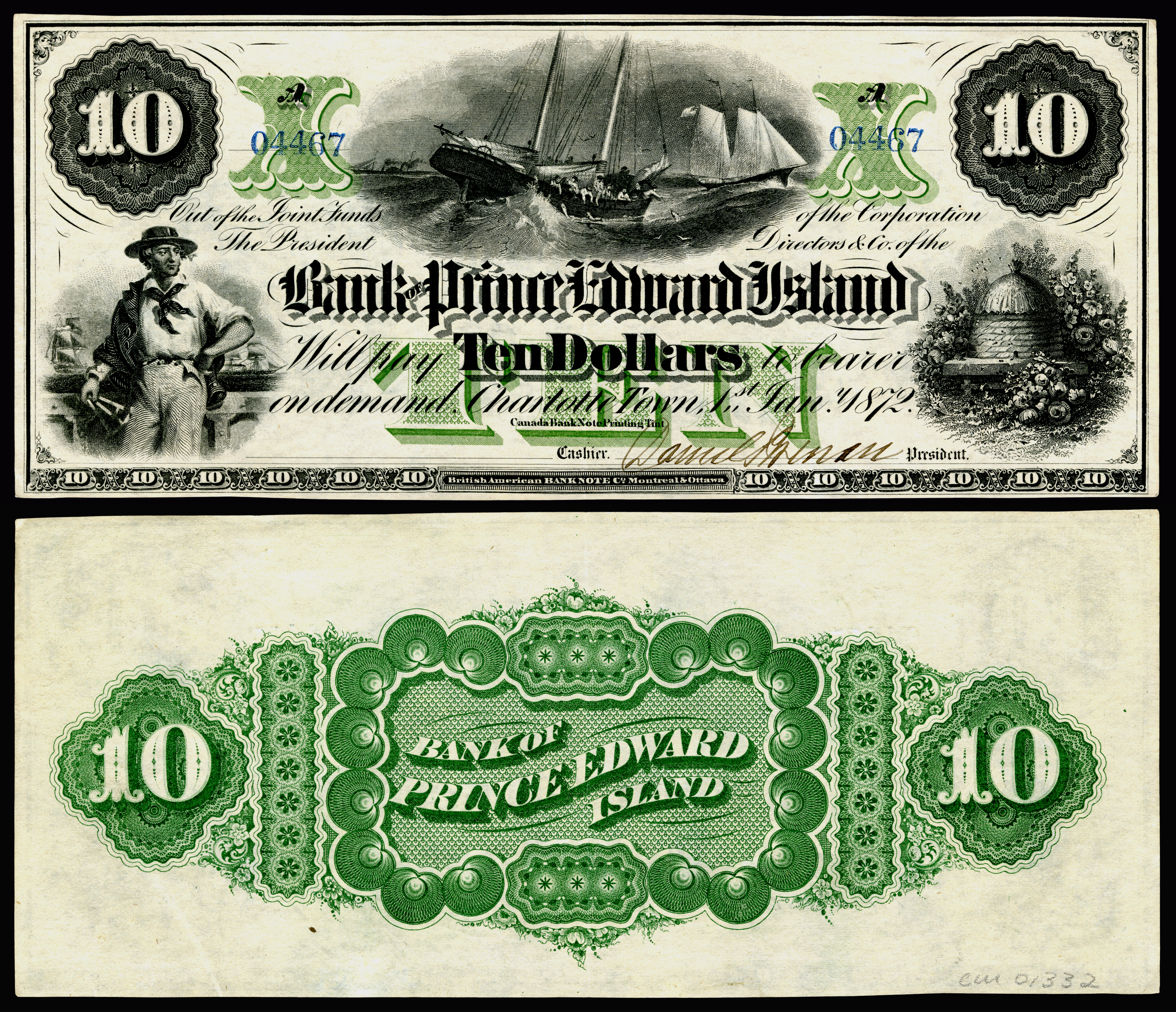
Ten-dollar note of the Bank of Prince Edward Island, 1872

Prince Edward Island shifted to decimal currency in 1871, with the dollar replacing the Prince Edward Island pound. By statute, dollars and cents were adopted as the unit of account for the colonial government. The statute also set the exchange rate between sterling and the dollar at £1 equal to $4.8666. The colonial government was authorized to arrange for the printing of notes denominated in dollars, and the issuance of copper coins in cents.

== Province of Canada government notes ==
=== Proposal for a central bank, 1841 ===
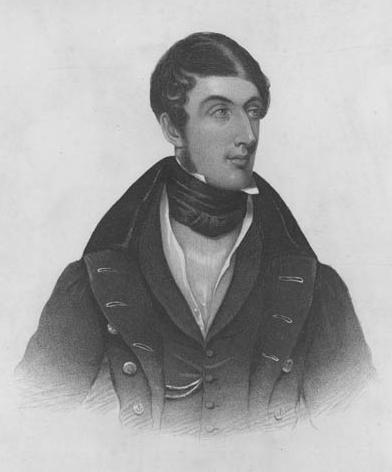
Governor General Lord Sydenham, who proposed a central bank and provincial notes

In 1841, the first Governor General of the new Province of Canada, Lord Sydenham, proposed the creation of a provincial central bank. He suggested that the province establish a bank which would have exclusive power to issue bank notes. The first issue would be for £1 million in provincial notes, but denominated in dollars. The notes would be backed by a combination of gold held by the province (25% of the value of the notes issued) and provincial government securities. The private banks would lose their power to issue bank notes. The proposal would have the double effect of providing a stable provincial currency, and also providing a guaranteed revenue source for the provincial government, estimated at £30,000 per year, from seigniorage.

The proposal had the support of Francis Hincks, who chaired a parliamentary committee to study the proposal, but the proposal faced strong opposition. The private banks lobbied against it, fearing the loss of profits if their power to issue bank notes was eliminated. There were also fears expressed that the new bank would make credit tighter, making it harder to borrow money. A third concern was that it would place too much power in the hands of the government. Ultimately, the committee rejected the proposal.

=== Province of Canada notes ===
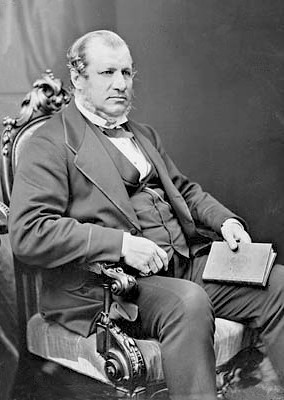
Alexander Galt, Minister of Finance, who proposed the Province of Canada notes

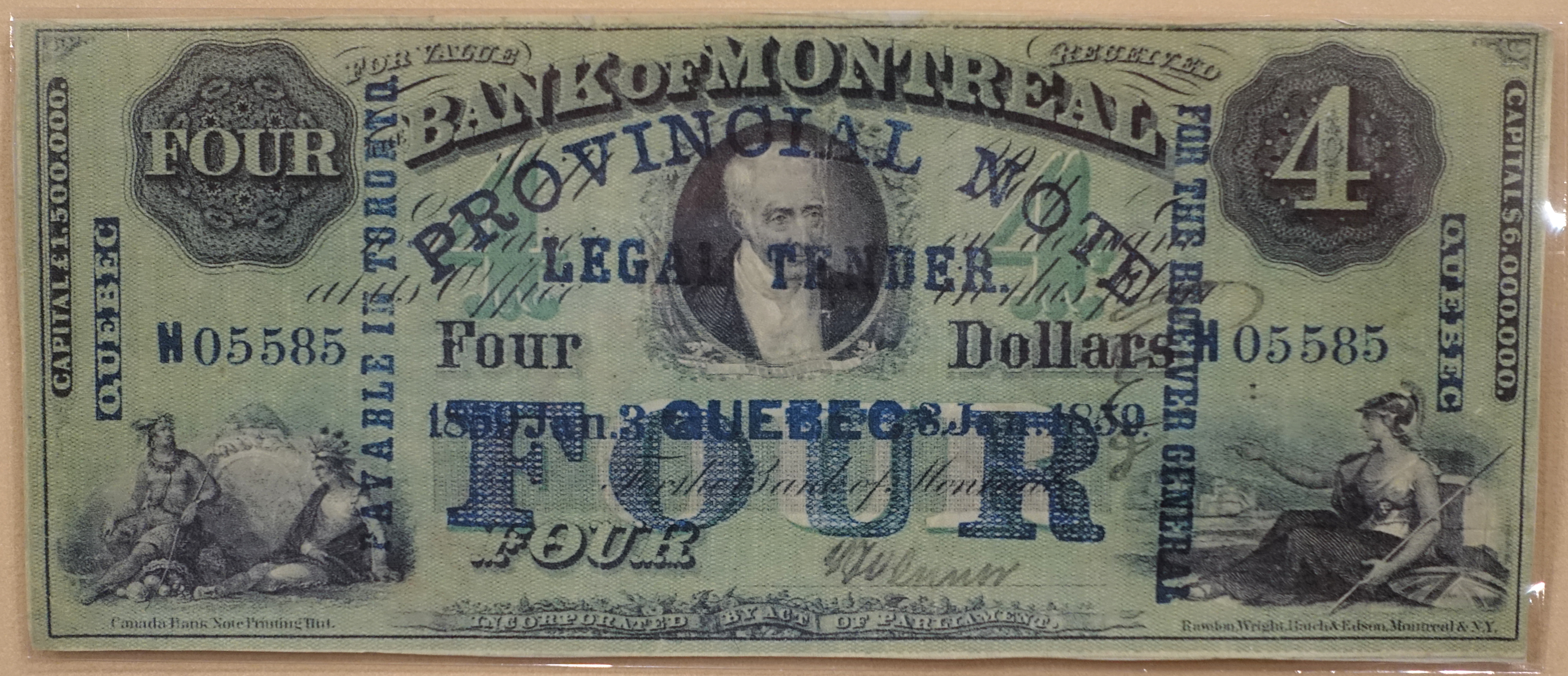
Bank of Montreal four-dollar note, 1859, over-printed as a Province of Canada note

In the 1850s, there were several bank failures which shook confidence in the security of banknotes in the Province of Canada: first the Colonial Bank and the International Bank in 1859, followed soon afterwards by the collapse of the Bank of Clifton and the Bank of Western Canada. The bank failures made their notes worthless, and the resulting scandal increased pressure on the government for greater bank regulation. In 1860, the provincial Minister of Finance, Alexander Tilloch Galt, proposed that the government issue bank notes, replacing notes issued by the private banks. The banks, fearing a loss of profits, opposed the proposal and the Government quickly withdrew it.

Six years later, the proposal re-surfaced, this time driven by the government's need for money. It was having trouble raising loans either in Canada or in Britain and decided to issue provincial government notes as a way to raise money. The Provincial Notes Act authorized the Province to issue notes up to the value of $8 million, backed partly by gold and partly by government debentures. They were redeemable in either Toronto or Montreal. Unlike Galt's proposal six years earlier, the private banks were not required to give up their power to issue bank notes, although they were offered financial inducements to do so. Any bank which did so could then act at the government's banker and its notes were deemed to be government notes. Only the Bank of Montreal did so, enabling it to act as the government's note issuer. It resumed issuing its own notes five years later.

The initial issue was based on Bank of Montreal notes, over-printed with "Province of Canada". The first issue by the Province itself was on January 1, 1867, just half a year before Confederation. The Province of Canada notes served as the basis for the notes later issued by the new country.

The 1867 issue consisted of a one-dollar note, featuring Samuel de Champlain and Jacques Cartier, with the provincial coat-of-arms; a two-dollar note, featuring Britannia and allegorical figures; a five-dollar note, featuring Queen Victoria, an indigenous woman, a lion and a ship under sail; a ten-dollar note, featuring Columbus, symbols of transportation, and beavers; a twenty-dollar note, featuring Albert Edward, Prince of Wales and his wife Alexandra, Princess of Wales, as well as beavers building a dam; and a fifty-dollar note featuring Mercury, the Roman god of commerce.

== Confederation, 1867 ==
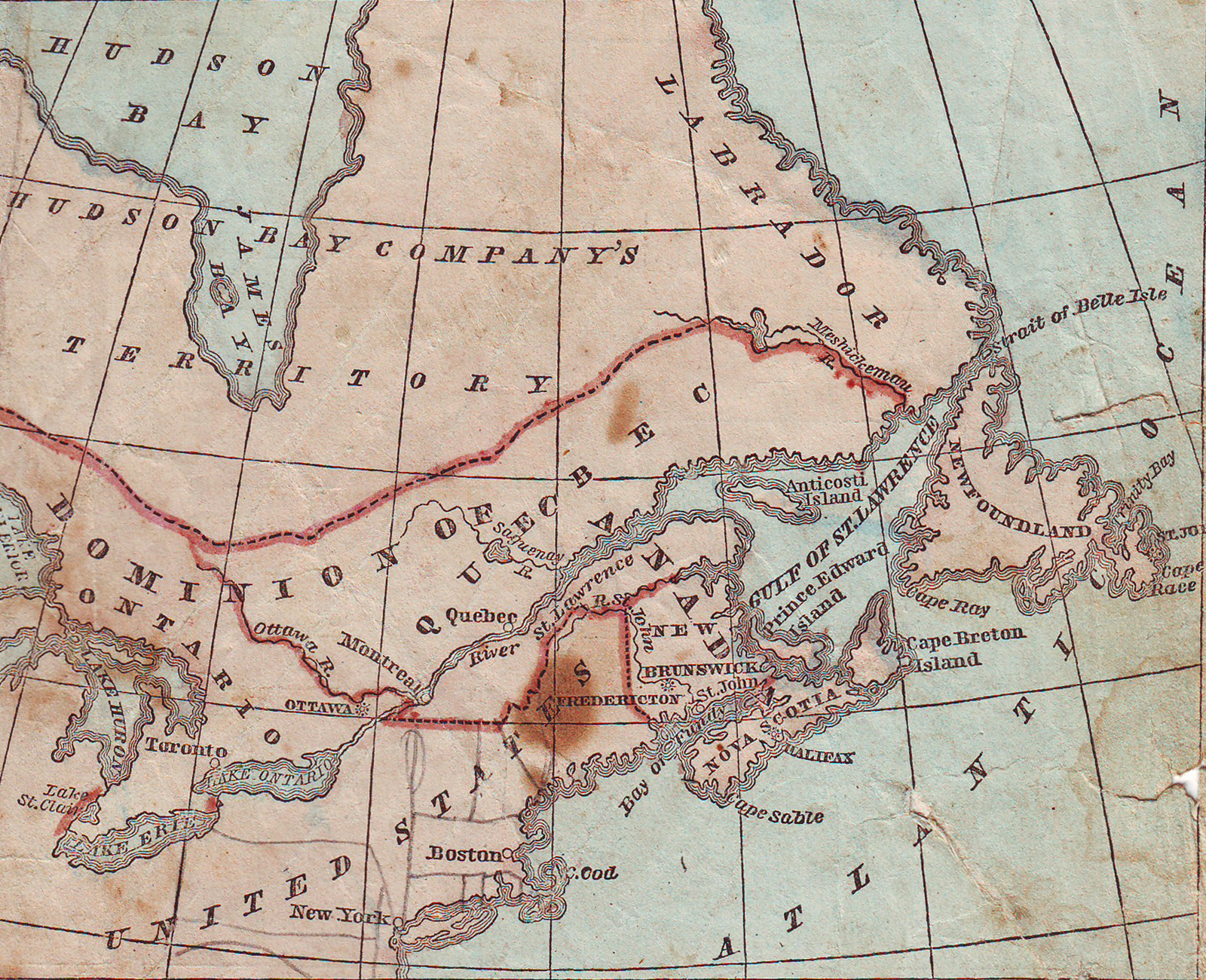
Canada in 1867

Canada was created in 1867 by the British North America Act, 1867 (now the Constitution Act, 1867). A federation, it originally had four provinces: Ontario, Quebec, New Brunswick, and Nova Scotia. The federal Parliament was assigned exclusive jurisdiction over "Coins and Currency", as well as "Banking, Incorporation of Banks, and the Issue of Paper Money". This resulted in major changes to the monetary system in the new country, with control over coinage and bank notes centralised in Ottawa.

=== Currency Acts ===
In 1868, the federal Parliament enacted the first Currency Act. It provided for the possibility that Canada might give its dollar exactly the same value as the United States dollar, but in the meantime, the pre-Confederation values for currency were maintained. The dollars circulating in Ontario, Quebec and New Brunswick continued to circulate at the same value, while the Nova Scotia dollars continued to circulate in Nova Scotia at their higher, pre-Confederation value. This situation continued for three more years, until Parliament passed the Uniform Currency Act. It provided that Nova Scotia would now use the same dollar as the rest of Canada, based on the pre-Confederation dollar. The value of the dollar continued to be set by reference to the British sovereign and the American eagle, at the rate of 4.8666 Canadian dollars equal to £1, and ten Canadian dollars equal to the ten-dollar American eagle, the same rates as set in the 1853 Province of Canada legislation.

The Uniform Currency Act applied automatically to Manitoba upon its admission to Confederation, but did not apply to British Columbia and Prince Edward Island when they joined. In 1881, Parliament passed an Act extending the Uniform Currency Act to those two provinces.

=== Dominion notes and bank notes ===
In 1868, the federal Parliament also enacted the Dominion Notes Act, to authorize the issue of government bank notes. The act was similar to the Provincial Notes Act from the Province of Canada, and the existing Province of Canada notes were continued as dominion notes. The government notes were referred to as "Dominion notes", using the term then used for the federal government, to distinguish them from bank notes issued by the chartered banks. The dominion notes were partially backed by gold. For the first $5 million in notes, the federal government was required to have gold reserves for twenty per cent of the value of the notes. The next $3 million issued notes were required to be backed by gold reserves of twenty-five percent of the value of the notes.

In 1871, the federal Parliament also passed a new Bank Act which replaced all the pre-Confederation banking legislation and created a uniform system of banking regulation for the new country. One important change was that the banks could not issue low-denomination bank notes, initially being limited to notes in denominations of four dollars and over. This limit was raised to five dollars in 1881. Only the federal government could issue low value denominations. The federal government also issued high denomination notes to facilitate large transfers of cash between the banks.

=== First Canadian coins ===
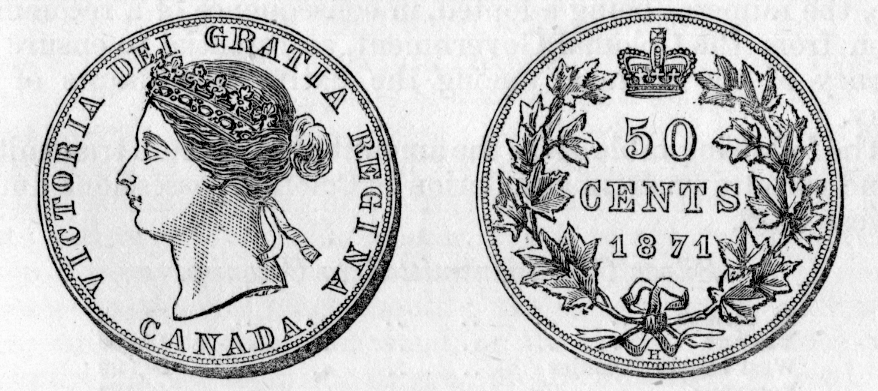
Illustration of the first Canadian fifty-cent coin, showing Queen Victoria, 1871

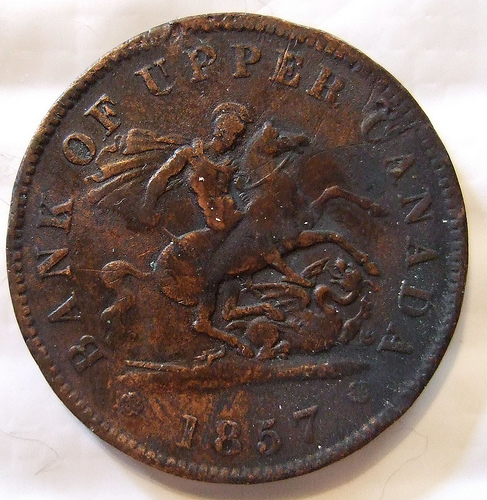
Bank of Upper Canada, one penny token showing St George and the Dragon, 1857

In 1867, the federal government planned to issue its own coinage, in denominations of one cent, five cents, ten cents, twenty-five cents, and fifty cents. The coins were similar to the coins of the Province of Canada, with the difference that the twenty-five-cent coin replaced the twenty-cent coin of the provincial currency. The twenty-cent coin had never been popular, as Canadians were used to the US twenty-five-cent coin, which circulated freely in the Province. The coins did not actually enter circulation until they arrived from the Royal Mint in London in 1870. The government did not issue the one-cent coin until 1876, given the amount of pre-Confederation pennies that were still in circulation.

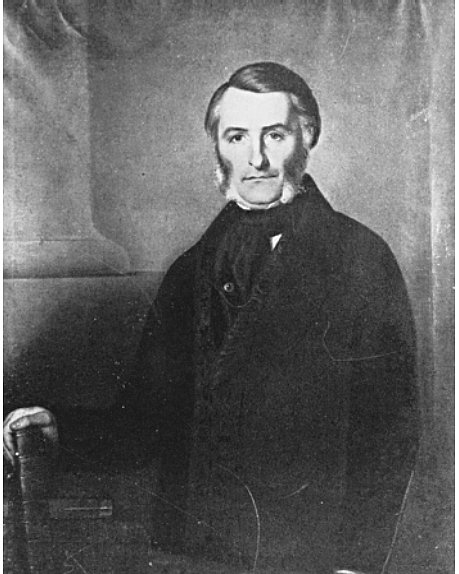
Francis Hincks, Minister of Finance, who oversaw the introduction of Canadian coins and currency, and dealt with the silver and copper coinage issues

One issue the government faced was the large amount of United States and, to a lesser extent, British silver coins which were circulating in Ontario and Quebec. The problem was that the coins were over-rated: their face values were greater than their bullion value. Banks would only accept them at a discount, while farmers and merchants found they had to take them at par value. The difference in values affected the farmers and merchants, and also had the effect of crowding the government one-dollar and two-dollars notes out of circulation. The solution was to collect the US and British coins and export them, while providing that in the future, their par value would be fixed by statute at only 80% of their face value. Francis Hincks, back in office as federal Minister of Finance, worked with bankers led by William Weir to successfully repatriate the silver coins to the United States and Britain.

There was a similar issue with copper coinage. Prior to Confederation, a large variety of copper coins had circulated: pennies issued by the provincial governments, US and British coppers, low-value tokens issued by private banks or merchants, even brass buttons in some cases. Working with the banks, the federal government gradually had all of the pre-Confederation and foreign pennies removed from circulation. In 1876, the Canadian one-cent coin finally was issued.

=== First Canadian notes ===
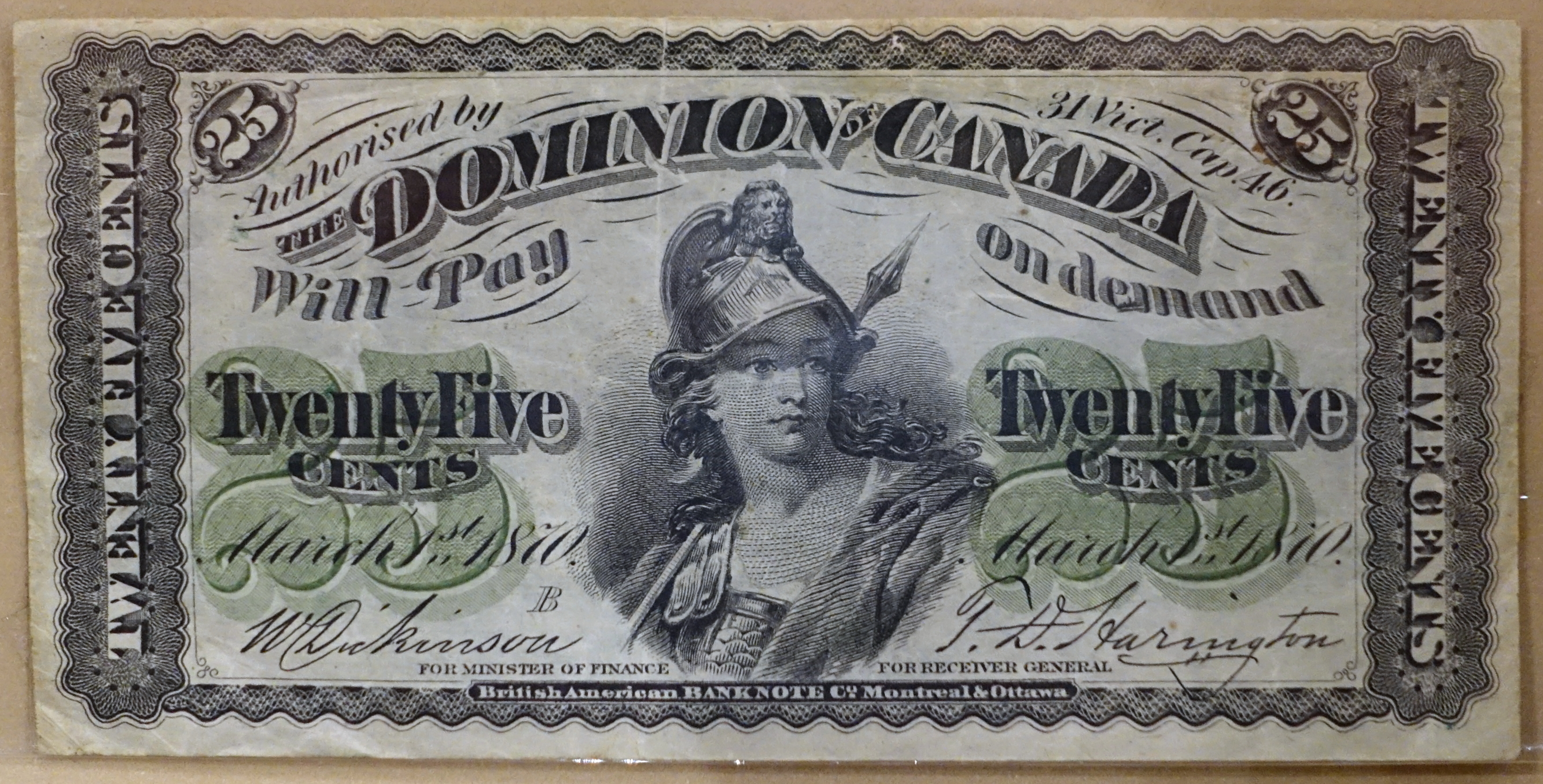
Dominion note for twenty-five cents, nicknamed a "shinplaster", issued in 1870, showing Britannia

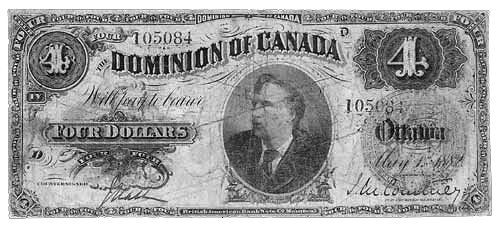
Dominion note for four dollars, issued in 1882, showing the Governor General, the Marquess of Lorne

The new Canadian government issued its first notes in 1870. The first issue was in denominations of twenty-five cents (nicknamed a "shinplaster"), one dollar and two dollars. The twenty-five cent note featured Britannia, the one-dollar note featured Jacques Cartier, and the two-dollar note featured General James Wolfe and the Marquis de Montcalm.

The twenty-five cent note was issued as a temporary expedient, while the government waited for a shipment of twenty-five-cent coins from the Royal Mint in London. However, the twenty-five cent note proved so popular that it continued in circulation for the next sixty-five years, with new versions in 1900 and 1923.

In 1871, the federal government issued notes for five hundred dollars and one thousand dollars, featuring Queen Victoria on the five-hundred-dollar note and an allegorical female figure with the arms of Canada on the one thousand-dollar note. In 1872, the government issued a fifty-dollar note, featuring Mercury, the Roman god of commerce, and a one-hundred-dollar note, featuring the Centre Block of the Parliament buildings. A two-dollar note was issued in 1878, featuring the Governor General, the Earl of Dufferin. This was followed in 1882 by a four-dollar note featuring the then Governor general, the Marquess of Lorne.

=== Chartered bank notes ===
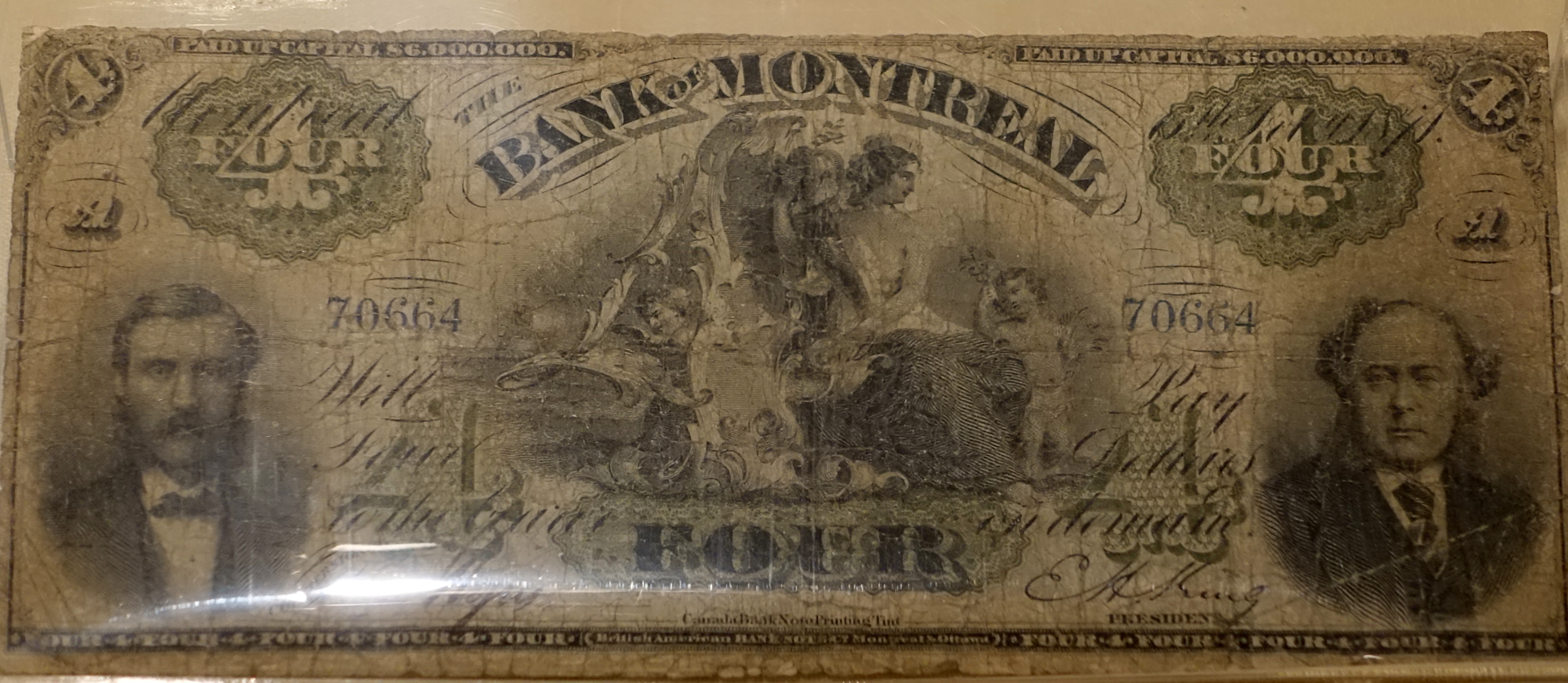
Four-dollar banknote issued by the Bank of Montreal, 1870, featuring bank officials

Under the new Bank Act passed in 1871, the chartered banks were limited to issuing notes in denominations of four dollars and over. To avoid using the one- and two-dollar notes issued by the government, some banks took to issuing notes in odd denominations, such as six-dollar and seven-dollar notes. This meant that they could carry out transactions without having to obtain the government notes, and maximize the circulation of their own notes.

The government closed off this loophole in 1880. By an amendment to the Bank Act, Parliament provided that the banks could only issue notes in denominations of five dollars and higher, and also only in multiples of five dollars. The amendment Act also provided, for the first time, that the bank notes were a first charge on the assets of a bank, in case of insolvency. In 1890, the banks were required to operate redemption offices for their notes across the country, which meant that bank notes no longer traded at a discount if they were far from a branch of the bank.

=== Dominion "Bank legal" Notes ===
In 1896, the federal government began to issue large denomination notes whose usage was restricted to the chartered banks. Their purpose was to assist the banks in maintaining their reserves of Dominion notes, as required by the Bank Act, and also to assist the banks in settling their cash balances with each other. The notes stated on their face that they were "Legal tender note for use by Banks only", which led to their common name, "Bank legals". Bank legals ceased to be issued after the establishment of the Bank of Canada.

The issues were as follows:

- 1896: denominations of five hundred dollars (featuring the Marquess of Lorne), one thousand dollars (Queen Victoria), and five thousand dollars (John A. Macdonald);
- 1901: denominations of one thousand dollars (featuring Lord Roberts) and five thousand dollars (Queen Victoria);
- 1918: denominations of five thousand dollars (featuring Queen Victoria) and fifty thousand dollars (King George V and Queen Mary);
- 1924: denominations of one thousand dollars (featuring Lord Roberts), five thousand dollars (Queen Victoria), and fifty thousand dollars (King George V and Queen Mary).

== Establishment of the Royal Canadian Mint ==
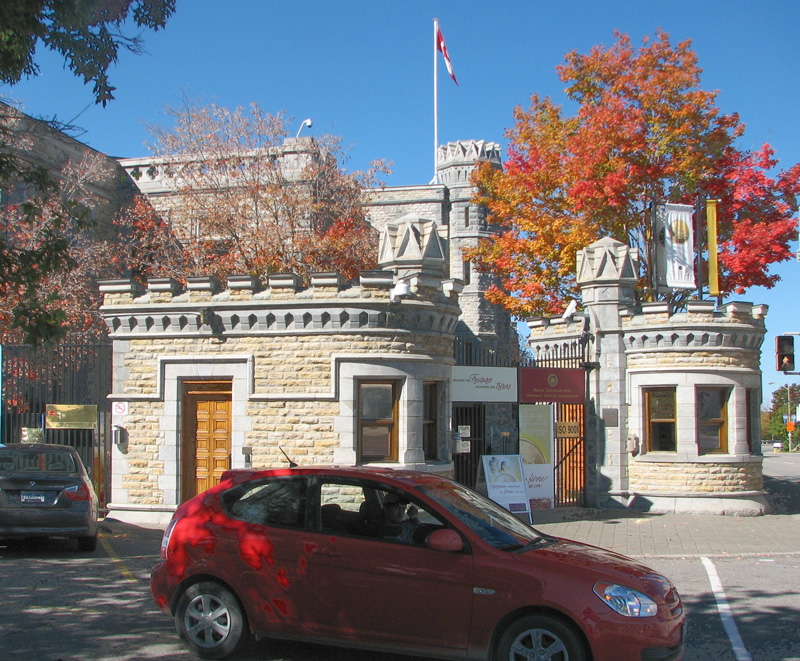
The Royal Canadian Mint in Ottawa

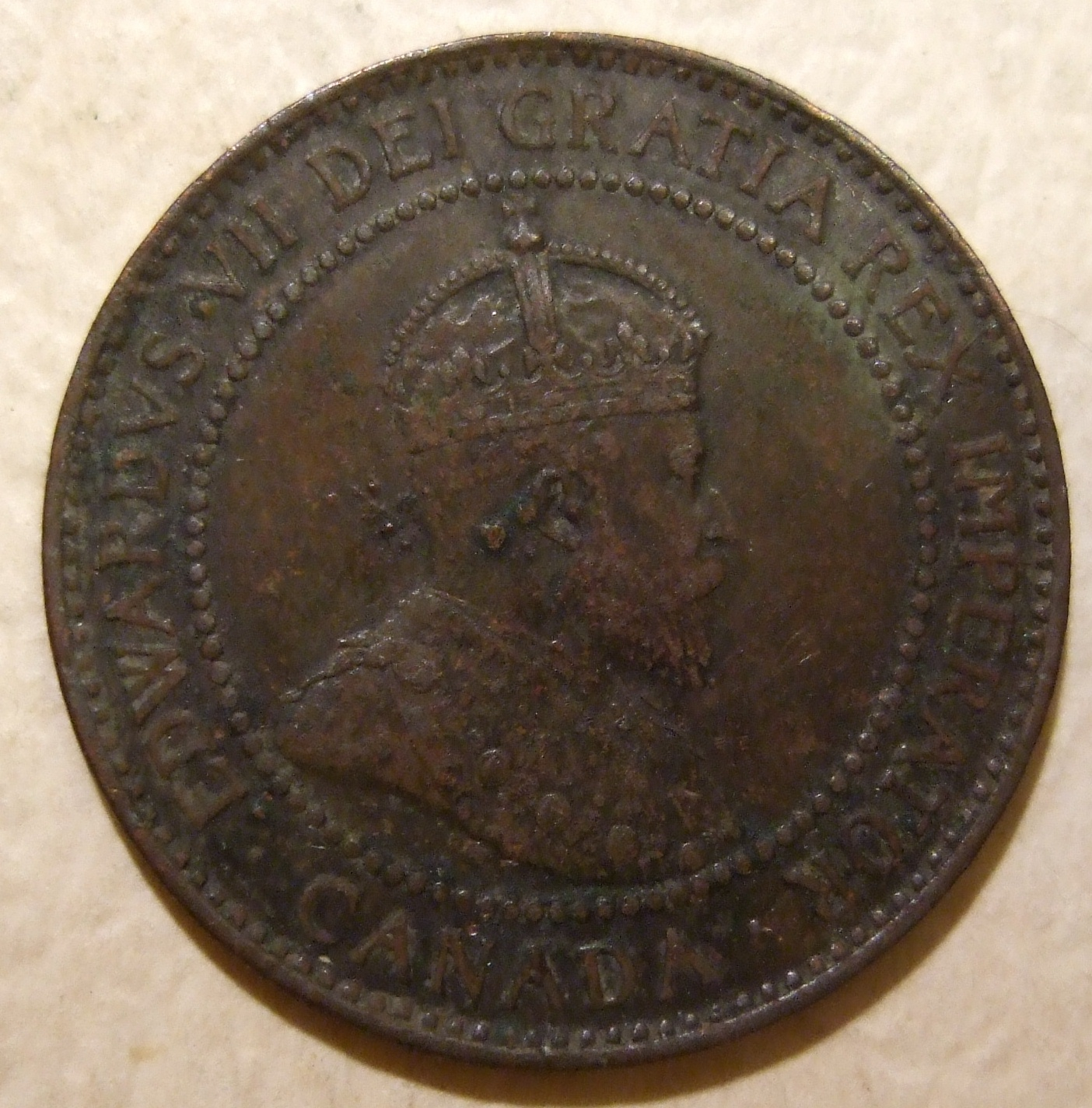
One-cent coin bearing King Edward VII, issued in 1908

During the British colonial period, the colonies were generally prohibited from minting their own coins. They obtained them by purchase from the Royal Mint in London. After Confederation, the first Canadian coins were also minted in London, but the possibility of a Canadian mint began to be raised in public debates.

Under the British Coinage Act, 1870, the British government could establish branches of the Royal Mint in overseas British possessions. In 1901, the Canadian Parliament passed an Act to pay for the expenses of a local branch of the Royal Mint, up to $75,000 annually, upon the establishment of a branch by the British government. In 1907, the British government established a branch of the Royal Mint at Ottawa, to be operated at the expense of the Canadian government, by means of a royal proclamation under the Coinage Act, 1870.

At the formal opening of the Ottawa branch of the Royal Mint on January 2, 1908, the Governor General, Earl Grey, struck the first coin minted in Canada: a silver 50 cent piece, bearing the effigy of King Edward VII. The second coin struck was a one cent piece. As a branch of the Royal Mint, the Ottawa Mint was authorized to mint gold sovereigns, with the same legal status as sovereigns issued by the Royal Mint in Britain. In 1911, the Ottawa branch produced over 256,000 sovereigns.

In 1931, the Canadian government took over full control of the Ottawa branch of the Royal Mint, renaming it the Royal Canadian Mint and bringing it under the authority of the Minister of Finance. The British government accordingly repealed the status of the Mint as a branch of the Royal Mint.

== Relationship to the gold standard ==
When first created in 1868, the Canadian dollar was partially backed by gold. Under the Dominion Notes Act, the government was required to have gold reserves of up to twenty per cent of the value of the first five million dollars of notes issued, rising to twenty-five per cent of the value of the next three million dollars issued. This followed the similar requirement which had been in place for the Province of Canada dollar since 1854.

The combination of the gold standard, the fixed value of the Canadian dollar to both the pound sterling and the US dollar, and the lack of any controls on the export of gold meant that the federal government did not have much ability to implement monetary policy. As a result, Canada experienced several periods of rapid economic contraction and expansion in the period between the establishment of Canadian currency and the outbreak of World War I. In the days immediately prior to the outbreak of the war in August 1914, withdrawals from banks increased dramatically and there was a fear of bank runs, as depositors demanded gold or government notes rather than bank notes. The federal government took steps to stabilise the banks, including ending the convertibility of notes to gold for the duration of the War. Instead, the bank notes acquired status as legal tender. Canada was off the gold standard. As well, the federal government authorised the Minister of Finance to act as a lender of last resort to the banks to ensure their stability, one of the first steps towards the establishment of a central bank. Although it was widely expected that Canada would return to the gold standard after the War, it was not until 1926 that the government did so.

Following the return to the gold standard, British and United States gold coins, government of Canada notes, and Canadian coins were legal tender. Bank notes ceased to be legal tender. However, the return was short-lived. Britain went off the gold standard in September 1931, during the depths of the Great Depression. Canada followed suit by prohibiting export of gold on October 31, 1931, unofficially taking Canada off the gold standard. A year and a half later, the federal government ended the convertibility of government notes for gold. It was expected to be a temporary measure until the world economic situation improved, but Canada has never returned to the gold standard.

== Establishment of the Bank of Canada ==
=== Creation and functions of the Bank ===
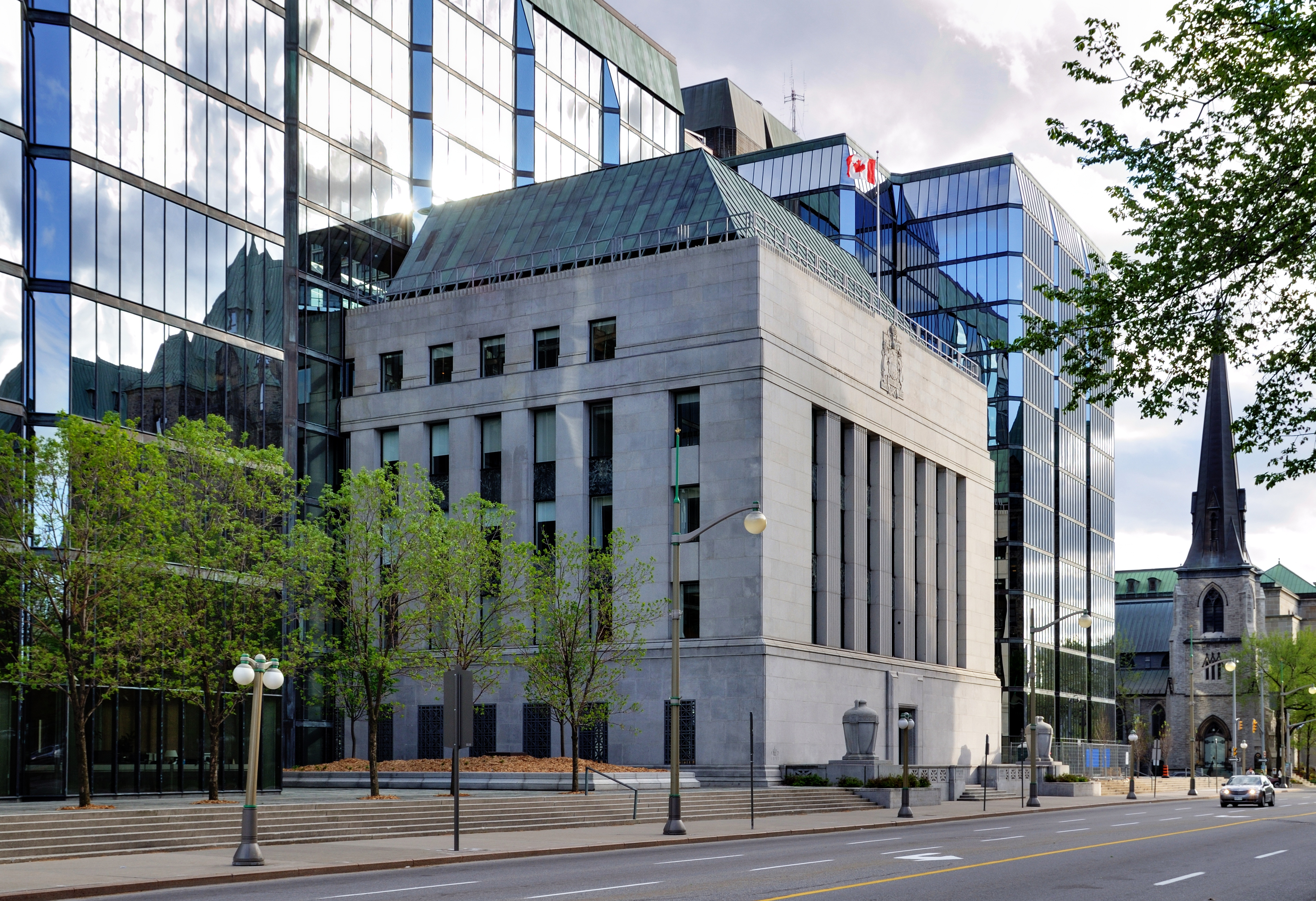
The original building of the Bank of Canada, with extensive additions to the rear

As the Great Depression continued in Canada, pressure grew on the federal government to take greater control over the economy, including monetary policy. Criticisms were levelled at the federal Treasury Board and Deputy Minister of Finance, who administered the Finance Act, suggesting that they were not sufficiently skilled in monetary policy. In response, the federal government in 1933 set up the Royal Commission on Banking and Currency to study the functioning of the Finance Act and to make recommendations about the establishment of a central bank. The commission, chaired by Lord Macmillan, reported later that year and recommended the establishment of a central bank, by a 3–2 division. The proposal had broad support from the two main political parties, but was opposed by the Canadian banks on monetary policy grounds, and also because of concern about loss of profits if they could no longer issue bank notes.

The federal government acted on the recommendation and passed the Bank of Canada Act in 1934. It came into force on March 11, 1935. The Bank was given an array of powers, including custodian of the gold reserves of the government, lender of last resort to chartered banks, and issuer of notes on behalf of the government. The Dominion Notes Act and the Finance Act, which had assigned these functions to the Minister of Finance, were repealed. The Bank's mandate was summarised in the preamble to the act:

WHEREAS it is desirable to establish a central bank in Canada to regulate credit and currency in the best interest of the economic life of the nation, to control and protect the external value of the national monetary unit and to mitigate by its influence fluctuations in the general level of production, trade, prices and employment, so far as may be possible within the scope of monetary action, and generally to promote the economic and financial welfare of the Dominion;

One former Deputy Governor of the Bank of Canada has stated that the Bank implements this mandate in three ways: "first, by keeping inflation low, stable, and predictable; second, by supporting a safe and efficient financial system; and third, by issuing money that is safe from counterfeiting and readily accepted".

=== First issue of Bank of Canada notes ===
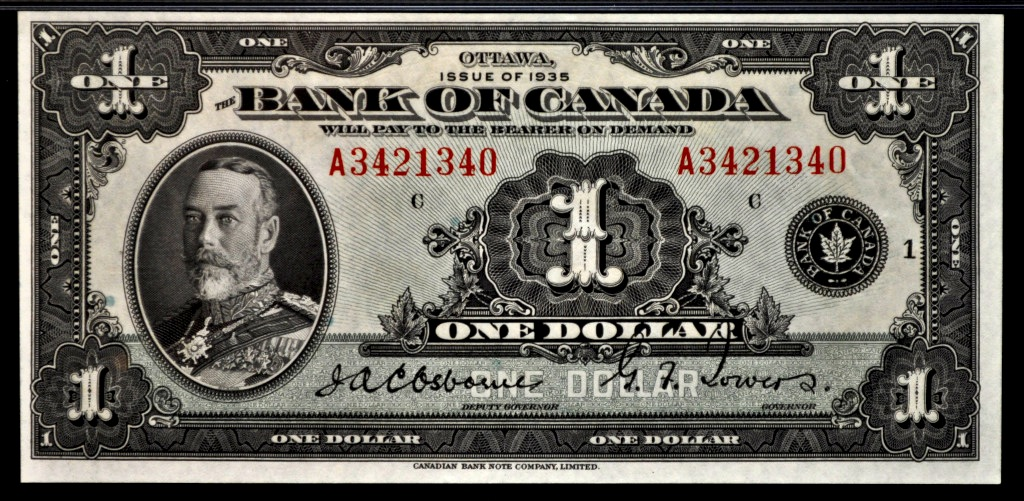
The one-dollar note of the 1935 series, featuring King George V

On March 11, 1935, the first day of its operation, the Bank issued its first series of notes. There were ten notes in the 1935 series, primarily featuring members of the Royal Family:

- a one-dollar note, featuring King George V;
- a two-dollar note, featuring Queen Mary;
- a five-dollar note, featuring Edward, Prince of Wales (later King Edward VIII);
- a ten-dollar note, featuring Mary, Princess Royal;
- a twenty-dollar note, featuring Princess Elizabeth (later Queen Elizabeth II);
- a twenty-five-dollar note, featuring King George and Queen Mary;
- a fifty-dollar note, featuring Prince Albert, Duke of York (later King George VI);
- a one-hundred-dollar note, featuring Prince Henry, Duke of Gloucester;
- a five-hundred-dollar note, featuring Prime Minister John A. Macdonald;
- a thousand-dollar note, featuring Prime Minister Wilfrid Laurier.

The previous Dominion notes, issued by the Minister of Finance, were rapidly withdrawn from circulation.

The 1935 series was the only Bank of Canada series to include a twenty-five-dollar note and a five-hundred-dollar note. The twenty-five-dollar note was a special commemorative note, for the twenty-fifth anniversary of George V's accession to the throne. The five-hundred-dollar note was a carry-over from the former government notes, which had included a five-hundred-dollar note since 1871, to facilitate transfers of large sums between the banks. No subsequent series has had a note of the same denomination. The 1935 series was also the only Bank of Canada series issued separately in English and in French. All series since then have been bilingual. To deter counterfeiting, the Bank regularly issues new series, replacing the old ones. There have been seven more series since the initial 1935 series: (1937, 1954, 1970, 1986, 2001, 2011), and the eighth series released in 2018.

=== Gradual elimination of chartered bank notes ===
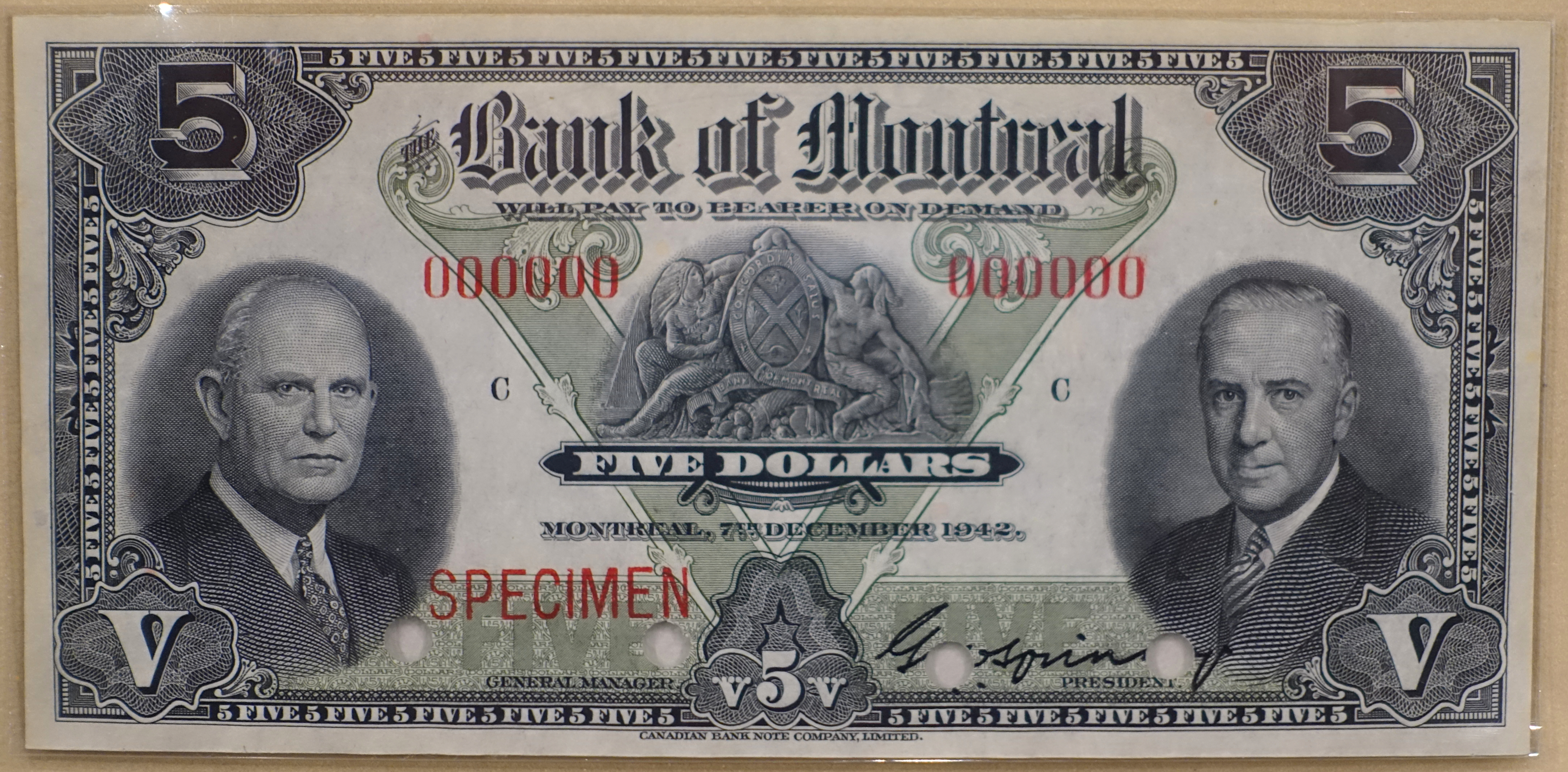
A five-dollar note issued by the Bank of Montreal in 1942, showing bank officials; one of the last bank notes issued by a chartered bank in Canada.

As the Bank of Canada became established, the federal government gradually reduced the power of the chartered banks to issue their own bank notes. In 1935, the banks were given ten years to reduce their notes in circulation to twenty-five per cent of their paid-up capital. A revision to the Bank Act in 1944 provided that the banks could not issue or reissue notes after the end of 1944, except outside Canada. The last note issued by a chartered bank for use in Canada was a five-dollar note issued by the Royal Bank of Canada in 1943. The old banknotes were gradually withdrawn from circulation. In 1953, the last remaining power to issue banknotes, for use outside Canada, was abolished and the Bank of Canada became the sole issuer of Canadian notes.

== Fixed and floating exchange rates ==
Since Canada has gone off the gold standard, it has fluctuated between fixed and floating exchange rates. The Canadian dollar currently has a floating exchange rate, since 1970.

=== Great Depression ===
As part of the reforms associated with the creation of the Bank of Canada and the economic difficulties of the Great Depression, Parliament also passed the Exchange Fund Act in 1935. The purpose of this Act was to create a fund, derived from the profits of the Bank of Canada, which would enable the government and the Bank to "aid in the control and protection of the external value of the Canadian monetary unit", i.e. to maintain the Canadian dollar at a certain rate against other currencies, if needed. However, the government did not use this power initially, allowing the dollar to float against other currencies.

=== World War II and aftermath ===
The situation changed in the immediate run-up to World War II. Both the pound sterling and the Canadian dollar began to slip against the United States dollar in August 1939, as war began to seem inevitable. Britain imposed exchange controls in early September. Canada followed in mid-September, imposing exchange controls under the War Measures Act, which gave extensive powers to the federal Cabinet.

The government fixed the value of the Canadian dollar against the pound sterling ($4.43 buying and $4.47 selling) and also against the US dollar ($1.10 (US$0.9091) buying and $1.11 (US$0.9009) selling). The government also imposed strict currency controls on exchanges with foreign currencies, particularly the United States dollar. Those measures lasted throughout the war, with some changes to the fixed exchange rates.

After the war ended, the government maintained the fixed rates and exchange controls for some years. However, that was balanced out by an unofficial exchange rate established by US markets, which triggered an extensive debate about the merits of a policy of floating exchange rates.

=== Floating rates: 1950–1962 ===
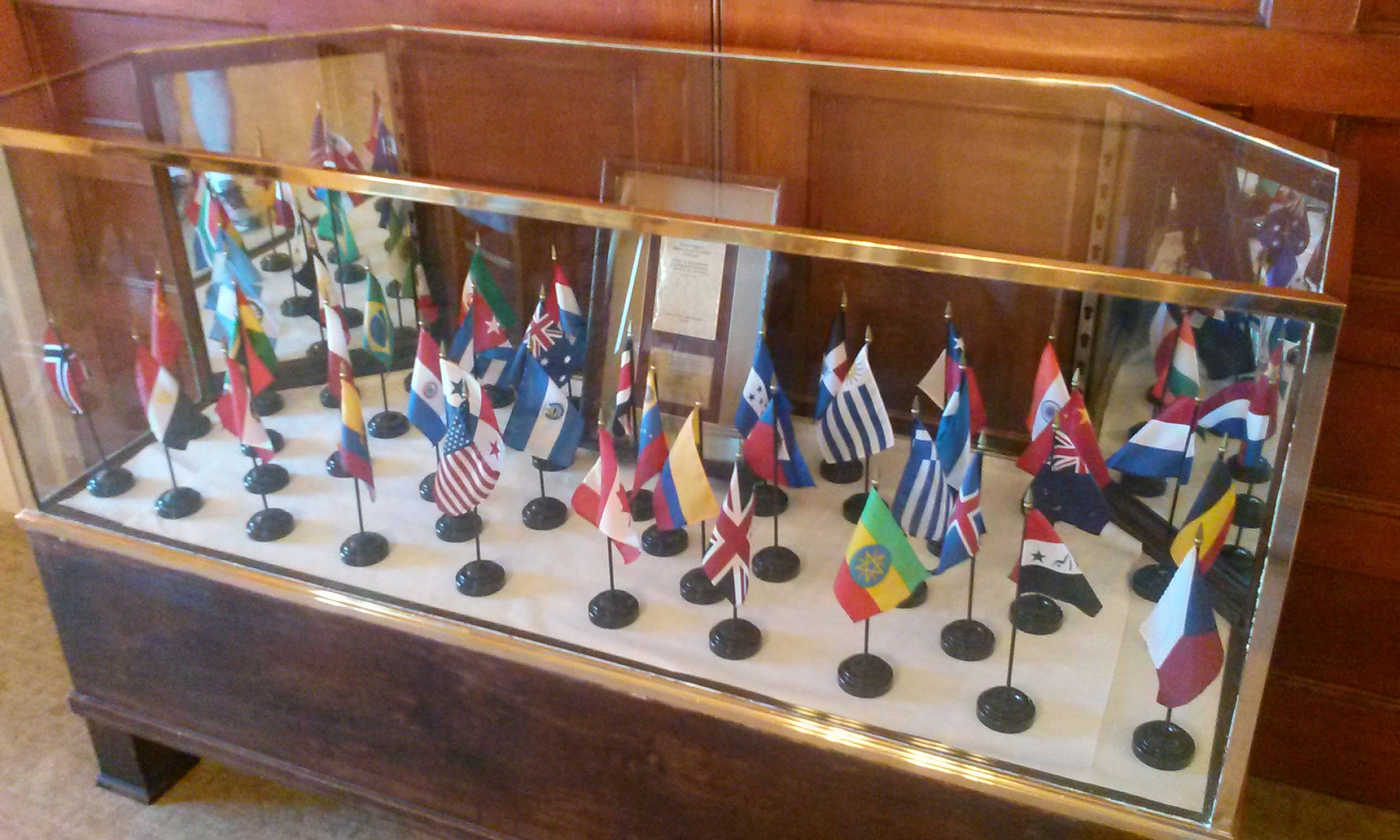
Bretton Woods participating nations display case

In 1950, the federal government decided to switch to a policy of floating exchange rates, while maintaining the restrictions on currency exchanges. The rationale was a concern about an increase in inflation if the Canadian dollar continued to be fixed against the US dollar, as was required by the Bretton Woods agreement. The decision to switch to a floating rate called into question the need for restrictions on currency exchanges, and those restrictions were gradually lifted during 1951. At the end of 1951, the exchange restrictions were abolished entirely. Canada stayed on a floating exchange rate for twelve years, in spite of urgings from the International Monetary Fund to return to the fixed rate system under Bretton Woods.

=== Fixed rates: 1962–1970 ===
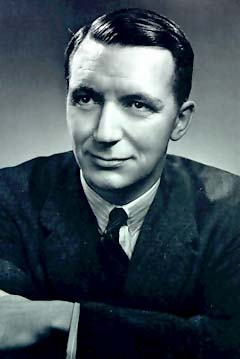
James Coyne, Governor of the Bank of Canada, 1955–1961

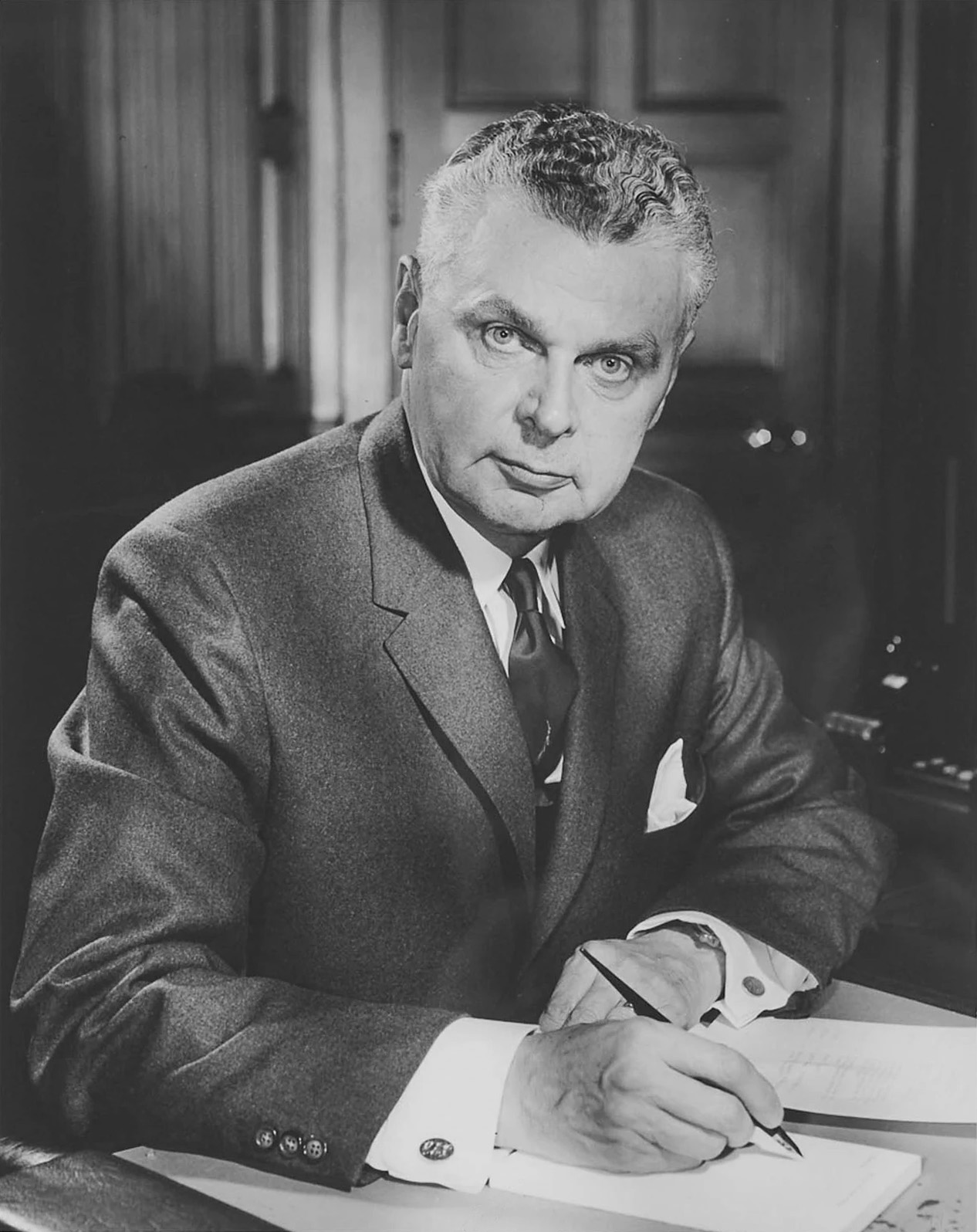
John Diefenbaker, Prime Minister of Canada, 1957–1963

In 1961, a major policy disagreement occurred between the Governor of the Bank of Canada, James Coyne, and the government of Prime Minister John Diefenbaker. The Governor favoured keeping the exchange rate floating, coupled with a restrictive monetary policy. He came under criticism for that approach, since Canada was going through a period of high unemployment and low inflation.

The Diefenbaker government favoured a return to fixed rates within the Bretton Woods system and a more expansionary monetary policy. The dispute escalated until Coyne resigned his position. The government introduced legislation to provide for a fixed rate, within a permitted range.

Both the economic situation and the political controversies contributed to downwards pressure on the dollar. The Canadian government and the Bank of Canada negotiated with other countries and central banks for supports for the dollar. The government found it necessary to intervene in the money markets in support of the dollar.

=== Floating rates: 1970 onwards ===
In 1970, rising inflation and inflow of foreign exchange led to pressures on the dollar. The government was concerned that massive and expensive interventions in the foreign exchange market would be required to maintain the dollar within the fixed rate band. In May 1970, the government announced that it would allow the dollar to float. Although the decision was criticised by the International Monetary Fund, which continued to favour the Bretton Woods approach, within three years all major currencies were floating against the United States dollar. The Canadian dollar has had a floating exchange rate ever since.

Duguay, a former Deputy Governor of the Bank of Canada, has stated that a flexible exchange rate favours a trading nation such as Canada, which produces commodities and also manufactured goods. He argues that a flexible exchange rate facilitates economic adjustment by sending important price signals to producers and consumers, encouraging prompt adjustments to changing economic circumstances. It also permits the Bank to adopt monetary policies which focus on controlling domestic inflation.

== Current designs for coins and notes ==
=== Coins ===
Canada's current coinage dates to 1937, when the Mint introduced new designs for the coins. The new coins replaced the old designs which dated back to 1858, when the Province of Canada introduced its first coinage. The 1858 coinage had featured the monarch on the obverse of all coins, with a wreath of maple leaves surmounted by a crown on the reverse. The 1937 re-design continued to feature the monarch on the obverse of all coins, but introduced new patterns for the reverse of each coin:

- One-cent (penny): two maple leaves;
- Five-cent (nickel): a beaver;
- Ten-cent (dime): the schooner Bluenose;
- Twenty-five cent (quarter): a caribou;
- Fifty-cent (half-dollar): Canadian coat of arms.

These designs were the work of Emanuel Hahn (10¢ and 25¢) and George Kruger Gray (1¢, 5¢ and 50¢). With the exception of the withdrawal of the penny and changes to the coat of arms on the 50-cent piece, these designs continue to be the basic features of Canadian coinage.

This series of coins was augmented in 1987 by the introduction of a new one-dollar coin, featuring a loon on the reverse, designed by Robert-Ralph Carmichael. The coin quickly became known as the "loonie", which in turn has become a nickname for the Canadian dollar generally.

The loonie was followed by the introduction of a two-dollar coin in 1996, designed by Brent Townsend. The two-dollar coin quickly acquired its own nickname, the "toonie".

The effigy of the monarch on the coins was originally based on dies provided by the Royal Mint in London, first for King George VI and then for Queen Elizabeth II. The effigy of George VI was designed by Humphrey Paget. However, given the length of the Queen's reign, four different versions of her effigy have been used, updated with her age: 1953, 1965, 1990 and 2003. The 1953 and 1965 effigies were designed for the Royal Mint, by British artists: Mary Gillick and Arnold Machin. The Canadian coins using these effigies are similar to those used on other Commonwealth coins of those periods. The 1990 and 2003 effigies were designed by Canadian artists: Dora de Pedery-Hunt designed the 1990 effigy, and Susanna Blunt designed the 2003 effigy.

Although these designs are the basic pattern for the coinage, the Mint regularly introduces commemorative coins, either for the entire series of coins, or on individual coins. Those commemorative issues are normally for a limited time period.

=== Notes ===
The current complete series of notes, known as the Frontier Series, is the seventh series of notes issued by the Bank of Canada. It consists of five notes:

- a five-dollar note, featuring Prime Minister Wilfrid Laurier
- a ten-dollar note, featuring Prime Minister John A. Macdonald
- a twenty-dollar note, featuring Queen Elizabeth II
- a fifty-dollar note, featuring Prime Minister William Lyon Mackenzie King
- a one-hundred-dollar note, featuring Prime Minister Robert Borden

The different denominations of the Frontier Series were released individually, starting in 2011. The notes are made of polymer, rather than paper, and contain a number of anti-counterfeiting measures, such as holographic features and transparent sections.

A new eighth series of notes began release in 2018. As of October 2019, only one note in the new series has been released, a ten-dollar note featuring Viola Desmond.

=== Withdrawn coins and notes ===
All of the previous Dominion notes issued by the Minister of Finance, and notes of all former series issued by the Bank of Canada, are gradually withdrawn from circulation when a new series issues. That process can take some time. For example, the Minister of Finance only issued one series of one-hundred-dollar Dominion notes, in 1871. The last time a $100 Dominion note was turned into the Department of Finance was in 1918.

In addition to that routine withdrawal from circulation, there have been other withdrawals when a coin or note no longer serves a purpose:

- the penny was withdrawn from circulation in 2013, because its value had depreciated so much it did not serve any true commercial purpose. Change for cash transactions is now rounded up or down to the nearest five cent.
- there has only been one twenty-five-dollar note, the Silver Jubilee note marking George V's twenty-fifth year on the throne, issued in the 1935 series. It was withdrawn from circulation on an ongoing basis.
- there has only been one five-hundred-dollar note issued by the Bank of Canada, in the 1935 series. The five-hundred-dollar denomination was a hold-over from the Dominion notes formerly issued by the Minister of Finance, and has not been repeated. Almost all of the 1935 five-hundred-dollar notes have been withdrawn.
- the last one-dollar note was issued in the Scenes of Canada series, starting in 1969–70 and continuing until the Birds of Canada series began in 1986. There was no one-dollar note in the Birds of Canada series because of the introduction of the one-dollar coin in 1987, which entirely replaced the one-dollar note.
- the last two-dollar note was issued in the Birds of Canada series, starting in 1986 and continuing until the Canadian Journey series began in 2001. There was no two-dollar note in the Canadian Journey series because of the introduction of the two-dollar coin in 1996, which entirely replaced the two-dollar note.
- the last one thousand-dollar note was issued in the Birds of Canada series, starting in 1986. It was not included in the subsequent series because it was no longer needed for large cash transactions, in light of the growth of electronic transactions. In 2000, the Bank of Canada announced that the one thousand-dollar note was being withdrawn from circulation, on the recommendation of the Royal Canadian Mounted Police. Increasingly, the thousand-dollar note was being used in criminal transactions, such as money laundering and organised crime.

Notes from previous series continue to be legal tender when in circulation. However, in the 2018 Budget, the government announced it intends to introduce legislation to change to the status of some withdrawn notes: the one-thousand dollar note, the twenty-five-dollar note, the two-dollar note and the one-dollar note will no longer be legal tender, but could still be exchanged at banks for current notes at full value.

== See also ==
- History of Canada

== Bibliography ==
- Banning, E. B. (1988). Exploring Canadian Colonial Tokens. Charlton International Inc. ISBN 0-88968-074-4.
- Robert Chalmers, A History of Currency in the British Colonies (London: Eyre & Spottiswoode, 1893), pp. 184, 425.
- W. K. Cross, Charlton's Standard Catalogue of Canadian Coins (60th ed.), (Toronto: Charlton Press, 2005).
- R.J. Graham (ed.), Canadian Government Paper Money (30th ed.), (Toronto: Charlton Press, 2018).
- A.B. McCullough, "Currency Conversion in British North America, 1760–1900", (1983) 16 Archivaria 83.
- James Powell, A History of the Canadian Dollar (Ottawa: Bank of Canada, 2005).
