= £2 =

£2 may refer to:

== Current currencies ==
- Two pound coin, a British coin in current circulation
- Gold £2 coin, an historical circulating coin and a modern commemorative or bullion coin
- Falkland Islands £2 coin
- Gibraltar £2 coin
- Sudanese pound (LS 2 note)
- Saint Helena £2 coin
- Syrian pound (LS 2 coin)

== Obsolete currencies ==
- Canadian £2 note
- New Brunswick pound (£2 bill)
- Prince Edward Island pound (£2 note)
