= Prince Edward Island dollar =

Unit of currency used in Prince Edward Island

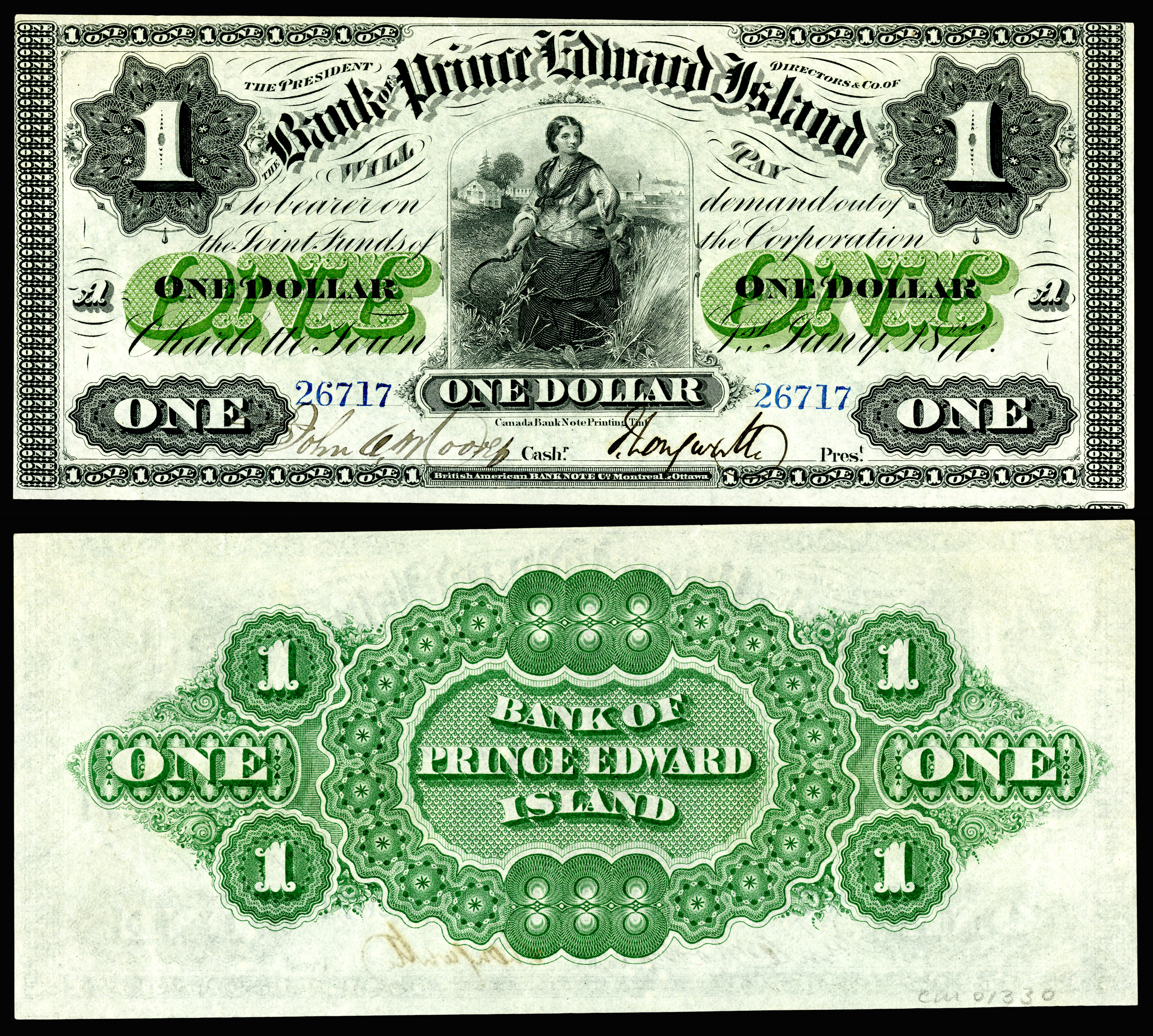
- $1

Units of account
- Symbol: $
- Subunit
- 1/100: cent
- Symbol
- cent: ¢

Denominations
- Banknotes: $1; $2; $5; $10; $20
- Coins: 1¢

Demographics
- Replaced: Prince Edward Island pound
- Replaced by: Canadian dollar
- User(s): Prince Edward Island

Issuance
- Central bank: Merchant Bank of Prince Edward Island

Valuation
- Pegged with: Canadian dollar at par
- This infobox shows the latest status before this currency was rendered obsolete.

The Prince Edward Island dollar was a unit of currency used in Prince Edward Island. The dollar replaced the Prince Edward Island pound in 1872 at a rate of 1 pound = 4.866 dollars (equivalent to the Canadian dollar). The dollar was subdivided into 100 cents.

== Coins ==
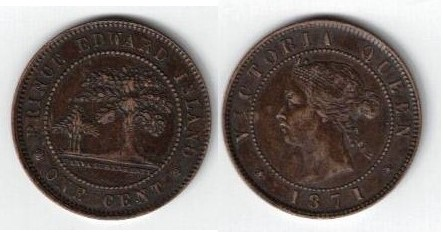
Prince Edward Island one cent coin (1871)

Only one type of coin, the one-cent piece, was struck for the Prince Edward Island dollar, in 1871. PEI entered Confederation two years later. Both sides of the coin were designed by Leonard Charles Wyon. The obverse had Queen Victoria, with inscription "VICTORIA QUEEN" and the date. The reverse was specially made for the PEI government, showing the seal of the colony—a large oak tree, symbolising England, sheltering three younger ones, which symbolised Prince Edward Island's three counties. Below the seal was located the Latin phrase "PARVA SUB INGENTI", translated as "The small beneath the great". Around the seal and phrase was written "PRINCE EDWARD ISLAND", and the denomination, "ONE CENT". The coin was produced at the Heaton Mint, due to the London Mint having to strike domestic coins. However, the "H" mint mark is missing. The coin is composed of 95% copper. 4% tin, and 1% zinc. It has a weight of 5.67 grams and a diameter of 25.40 mm. It has a plain edge, and a coin orientation. Two million one-cent pieces were minted. PEI's government would experience difficulties in placing the coins in circulation—10 years were needed for the government to get rid of them. The last of the coins were sold at a 10 percent discount.

== Banknotes ==
The Prince Edward Island Treasury issued British pound notes (1848–58) in 5 and 10 shilling, and 1, 2, and 5-pound denominations. The Merchant Bank of Prince Edward Island issued banknotes (1871–91) in 1, 2, 5, 10, and 20 dollar denominations (and prepared a proof for a 5 dollar 1900 issue, but it never circulated).

=== Bank of Prince Edward Island ===
The Bank of Prince Edward Island (PEI) incorporated on 14 April 1856 in Charlottetown, after nearly two years of negotiations with Great Britain over the legality of a colony-established bank. On 13 August 1856 the bank opened for business, and was the first bank established on the island. The founding directors included: James Peake, Richard Heartz, Daniel Davies, Henry Haszard, and Daniel Brenan.

In 1857 the Bank of PEI temporarily closed (citing a provision in their original charter, they suspended all financial transactions for three months) after the directors discovered that the bank president and cashier had made loans that exceeded their capital. The cashier (William Cundall) remained at the bank while the president (Ralph Brecken) resigned.

In 1881, after it was discovered that the cashier (Joseph Brecken, son of former president Ralph Brecken) had made irresponsibly large loans, the bank was closed, and liquidated over the next several years (1882–87). The Bank of Prince Edward Island was the first in Canada to file for bankruptcy.

==== Issuance ====
The bank's first issue of paper currency was dated the same day (13 August) and included 5 and 10 shilling notes, and 1 and 5 pound notes. A shorter issue of notes in 1859 only included the 10 shilling and 2 pound denominations. The 1872 issue in Canadian dollars (below) was initially dated 1 January 1872 (and then reissued again 1 January 1877).

Complete denomination set Bank of Prince Edward Island (1872–77)
Value	Date	Image
1 Dollar	1877	
2 Dollars	1877	
5 Dollars	1877	
10 Dollars	1872	
20 Dollars	1872	

== See also ==
- Prince Edward Island pound
