= Prince Edward Island pound =

Currency of Prince Edward Island until 1871

The pound was the currency of Prince Edward Island until 1871. It was divided into 20 shillings, each of 12 pence. It was replaced by the dollar in 1871. Initially sterling coin circulated, together with locally produced coins and paper money.

== Coins ==
The only coins issued exclusively for Prince Edward Island were issued in 1813. There were two denominations, the 1/– and 5/–. Both were produced by cutting a central plug from a Spanish dollar (8 real) coin. The plug, stamped with a sunburst, made the 1/– piece, whilst the similarly stamped ring made the 5/– piece. Due to its shape, the 5/– coin was known as a holey dollar.

== Banknotes ==
In 1790, the Island of St. Jean (as Prince Edward Island was then known) issued Treasury notes in denominations of 1/–, 1/6, 2/6, 5/–, 10/–, 20/– and 40/–. A further issue of Treasury notes was made between 1834 and 1870, with denominations of 5/–, 10/–, £1, £2, and £5.

Along with the Treasury notes, two chartered banks issued paper money, the Bank of Prince Edward Island which commenced operations Aug 13, 1854 and the Union Bank of Prince Edward Island. However, the pounds issued by these two banks had different values relative to sterling. The Bank of Prince Edward Island issued notes in denominations of 5/–, 10/–, £1, £2 and £5 between 1856 and 1863. This pound unit was worth 13s.4d. sterling and the notes also carried the denomination in sterling (3s.4d., 6s.8d., 13s.4d., £1.6s.8d. and £3.6s.8d.). The Union Bank issued notes between 1864 and 1865 denominated in both dollars (worth 4s.2d.) and sterling. Denominations were $1, $2, $5 and $20 (4s.2d., 8s.4d., £1.0s.10d, £4.3s.4d sterling).

== See also ==
- Prince Edward Island dollar
