= List of road routes in the Australian Capital Territory =

Road routes in the Australian Capital Territory assist drivers navigating roads throughout the territory, or may have a second local name in addition to a primary name. The ACT previously used an older, numerical shield-based system, which was replaced by a newer, alphanumeric system in 2013. Many major roads in the ACT are not assigned a route number.

The ACT implemented the federally-issued National Routes system between 1955 and 1956, using white-and-black shields highlighting interstate links between major regional centres; some of these routes were later upgraded into National Highways using green-and-gold shields when the National Roads Act was passed in 1974. Seven Tourist routes were also allocated across the territory in early 1990, but were decommissioned by 2019. The alphanumeric system, introduced in 2013 (at the same time as New South Wales), has effectively replaced the previous scheme across the territory.

Roads are described in either a west–east or north–south alignment.

== Current routes ==
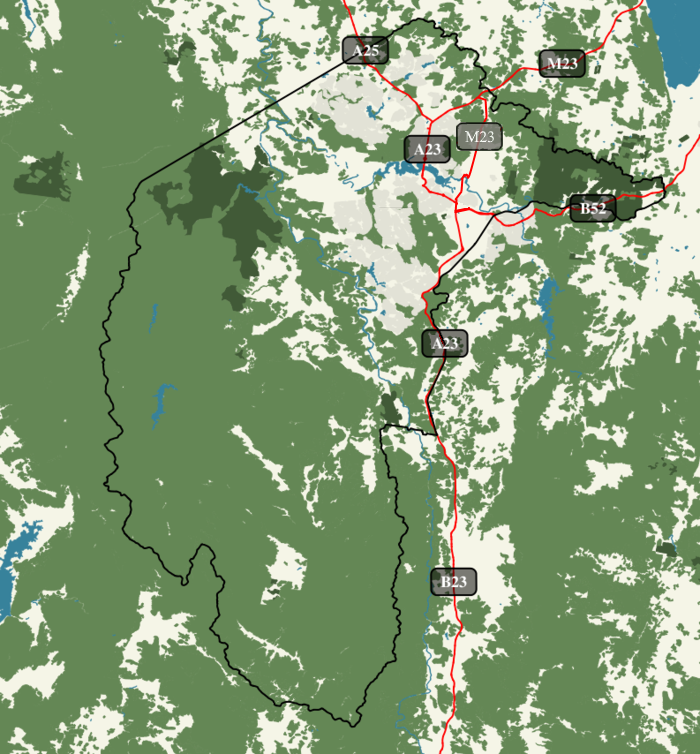
Current road routes in the ACT.
Legend:
Routes
Urbanised Land
Water
Native Vegetation
Plantation

=== Alphanumeric routes ===
The alphanumeric system, introduced in 2013 (at the same time as New South Wales switched to their own alphanumeric system, as they shared some route allocations), replaced the previous National Route and National Highway scheme across the territory. It consists of alphanumeric routes, a two-digit number prefixed with a letter (M, A, or B) that denotes the grade and importance of the road, displayed on signs as yellow text on a green background with a white border; the ACT is now the only jurisdiction in Australia to use a border around allocations (NSW, previously the only other state that used them, removed them in 2020).

Route	Component roads	From	Via	To	Length	Notes
M23	Federal Highway; Majura Parkway; Monaro Highway	ACT/NSW border	Majura; Pialligo	Fyshwick	15.5 km (10 mi)	– allocated when Majura Parkway opened in 2016 – continues east along Federal Highway into NSW as – continues south along Monaro Highway as
A23	Federal Highway; Northbourne Avenue; Vernon Circle; Commonwealth Avenue; State Circle (n/bound); Capital Circle (s/bound); Canberra Avenue; Monaro Highway	Majura	Lyneham; Canberra Central; Manuka; Fyshwick; Hume; Williamsdale	ACT/NSW border	50 km (31 mi)	– continues east along Federal Highway as – continues south along Monaro Highway into NSW as
A25	Barton Highway	ACT/NSW border	Hall; Crace	Lyneham	11.9 km (7 mi)	Continues north along Barton Highway into NSW as
B52	Hindmarsh Drive; Canberra Avenue	Symonston	Jerrabomberra	ACT/NSW border	4.6 km (3 mi)	Continues east as along Canberra Avenue into NSW via Queanbeyan, and back into ACT eventually via Kowen
B52	Kings Highway	ACT/NSW border	Kowen	ACT/NSW border	7.5 km (5 mi)	– continues west as along Kings Highway into NSW via Queanbeyan, and back into ACT eventually to Fyshwick – continues east as along Kings Highway into NSW eventually to Batemans Bay

== Former routes ==
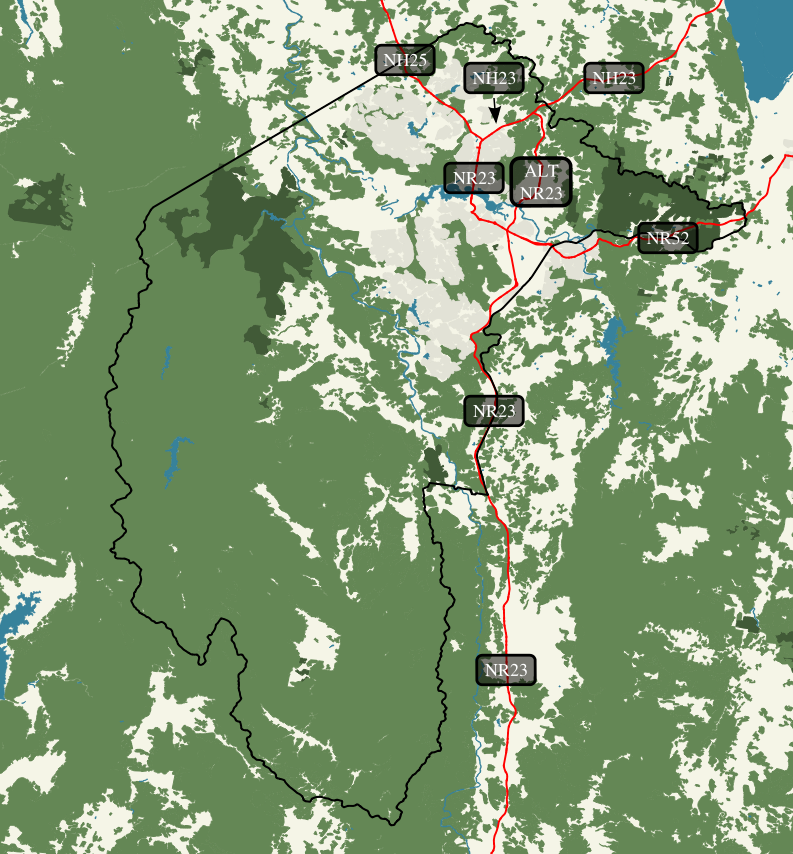
Former road routes in the ACT.
Legend:
Routes
Urbanised Land
Water
Native Vegetation
Plantation

=== National Routes ===
National Routes were the first type of route numbering to be attempted in Australia on a large scale, signed with a white shield and black writing (similar in shape to the shield that appears on the Australian coat of arms), with the ACT receiving routes in 1955 to 1956. They highlighted the interstate links connecting major population, industrial and principal regions of Victoria to the rest of the Australia, in a way that was readily identifiable to interstate travellers. The system was prepared by COSRA (Conference of State Road Authorities), held between 1953 and 1954: once each state road authority agreed to the scheme, it was rolled out federally. Selected routes were later upgraded into National Highways when the National Roads Act was passed in 1974.

The ACT's National Routes were eventually replaced with the alphanumeric system in 2013: each route was converted to an alphanumeric route number, rendering the black-and-white shield redundant, with each National Route keeping their number during the conversion.

Route	Component roads	From	Via	To	Length	Notes
National Route 23	Federal Highway	ACT/NSW border	Majura; Lyneham; Canberra Central; Manuka; Fyshwick; Hume; Williamsdale	ACT/NSW border	52 km (32 mi)	Replaced by in 1974
National Route 23	Northbourne Avenue; Vernon Circle; Commonwealth Avenue; State Circle (n/bound); Capital Circle (s/bound); Canberra Avenue; Monaro Highway	ACT/NSW border	Majura; Lyneham; Canberra Central; Manuka; Fyshwick; Hume; Williamsdale	ACT/NSW border	52 km (32 mi)	Replaced by in 2013
Alternate National Route 23	Majura Road; Fairbairn Avenue; Morshead Drive; Monaro Highway	Majura	Pialligo	Fyshwick	15.1 km (9 mi)	Allocated when Monaro Highway extension (then known as Eastern Parkway) to Pialligo completed in 1991, replaced by when Majura Parkway opened in 2016
National Route 25	Barton Highway	ACT/NSW border	Hall; Crace	Lyneham	11.9 km (7 mi)	Allocated after road sealing and upgrades in 1956, replaced by in 1974
National Route 52	Canberra Avenue	Fyshwick	Jerrabomberra	ACT/NSW border	4.6 km (3 mi)	– re-aligned through Queanbeyan from Norse Road (and Uriarra Road and Crawford Street in NSW) to current alignment (eliminating level crossing with Bombala railway line) in 1982 – replaced by in 2013
National Route 52	Kings Highway	ACT/NSW border	Kowen	ACT/NSW border	7.5 km (5 mi)	Replaced by in 2013
Decommissioned or unsigned allocation

=== National Highways ===
With the passing of the National Roads Act in 1974, selected National Routes were further upgraded to the status of a National Highway: interstate roads linking Australia's capital cities and major regional centres that received federal funding, and were of higher importance than other National Routes. These new routes were symbolised by green shields with gold writing (the word "National" along the top of the shield, present in other states' National Highways, was excluded for those within the ACT). Both of the ACT's National Highways – connecting the territory to the Hume Highway, itself later made a National Highway in 1979 – were converted in 1974.

Like National Routes, the ACT's National Highways were also replaced with the alphanumeric system in 2013, both keeping their number during the conversion.

Route	Component roads	From	Via	To	Length	Notes
National Highway 23	Federal Highway	ACT/NSW border	Majura	Lyneham	7.1 km (4 mi)	Replaced by in 2013, later by (from ACT/NSW border to Majura) when Majura Parkway opened in 2016
National Highway 25	Barton Highway	ACT/NSW border	Hall; Crace	Lyneham	11.9 km (7 mi)	– re-aligned through Hall when Hall bypass opened in 1980 – replaced by in 2013
Decommissioned or unsigned allocation

=== Tourist routes ===
Canberra had a collection of Tourist Routes, but in 2015, all but Tourist Route 5 were decommissioned, with Route 5 following the next year in 2016; route markers will be progressively removed once their signs require replacement.

Route	Component roads	From	Via	To	Length	Notes
Tourist Drive 1	State Circle; Commonwealth Avenue; London Circuit; Constitution Avenue; Reg Saunders Way; Russell Drive; Kings Avenue	Capital Hill	Civic; Russell; Parkes	Capital Hill	9 km (6 mi)	Parliamentary Triangle Loop, listed clockwise from Capital Hill
Tourist Drive 2	Vernon Circle; Commonwealth Avenue; Coronation Drive; Alexandrina Drive; Novar Street; Dudley Street; Cotter Road; Lady Denman Drive; Clunies Ross Street; Barry Drive; Northbourne Avenue	City Hill	Civic; Yarralumla; Curtin; Molonglo Valley; Acton; Turner	City Hill	18 km (11 mi)	Lake Burley Griffin Tour, listed clockwise from City Hill
Tourist Drive 3	Limestone Avenue; Treloar Crescent; Fairbairn Avenue; Morshead Drive; Russell Drive; Reg Saunders Way; Constitution Avenue; Anzac Parade	Campbell	Pialligo; Russell; Reid	Campbell	10 km (6 mi)	ANZAC Memorial Loop, listed clockwise from the Australian War Memorial
Tourist Drive 4	Vernon Circle; Northbourne Avenue (n/bound); Mouat Street; Ginninderra Drive (I); Braybrooke Street; Masterman Street; Leverrier Crescent; Battye Street; Haydon Drive; College Street; Eastern Valley Way; Emu Bank; Luxton Street; Coulter Drive; Ginninderra Drive (II); William Slim Drive; Owen Dixon Drive; Kuringa Drive; Barton Highway; Northbourne Avenue (s/bound)	City Hill	Civic; Turner; Lyneham; Bruce; Belconnen; McKellar; Giralang; Crace; Downer; Braddon	City Hill	36 km (22 mi)	Northern Sports and Recreation Tour, listed clockwise from City Hill
Tourist Drive 5	State Circle; Canberra Avenue; Monaro Highway; Tharwa Drive; Tidbinbilla Road; Cotter Road; Adelaide Avenue	Capital Hill	Manuka; Hume; Calwell; Tharwa; Stromlo; Coombs	Capital Hill	83 km (52 mi)	Science and Nature Loop, listed clockwise from Capital Hill
Tourist Drive 6	State Circle; Brisbane Avenue; National Circuit; Canberra Avenue; Dominion Circuit; Melbourne Avenue; Stonehaven Crescent; Hopetoun Circuit; Schlich Street; Empire Circuit; Akarna Street; Moonah Place; Perth Avenue; Darwin Avenue; Forster Crescent; Coronation Drive; Commonwealth Avenue	Capital Hill	Barton; Forrest; Deakin; Yarralumla	Capital Hill	10 km (6 mi)	Embassies Tour, listed clockwise from Capital Hill
Tourist Drive 7	London Circuit; Commonwealth Avenue (s/bound); King Edward Terrace; Parkes Place; King George Terrace; Langton Crescent; Commonwealth Avenue (n/bound); Edinburgh Avenue; Lawson Crescent; Liverside Street; Ellery Crescent; Marcus Clarke Street; Allsop Street; Childers Street; Hutton Street; Kingsley Street; Barry Drive; Northbourne Avenue	City Hill	Parkes; Acton; Turner	City Hill	11 km (7 mi)	Museum and Education Loop, listed clockwise from City Hill
Decommissioned or unsigned allocation

== See also ==
- Road Infrastructure in Canberra
- List of road routes in New South Wales
- List of road routes in the Northern Territory
- List of road routes in Queensland
- List of road routes in South Australia
- List of road routes in Tasmania
- List of road routes in Victoria
- List of road routes in Western Australia
