= Russell =

Russell may refer to:

== People ==
- Russell (given name)
- Russell (surname)
- Lady Russell (disambiguation)
- Lord Russell (disambiguation)
- Justice Russell (disambiguation)

== Places ==
- Russell Island (disambiguation)
- Mount Russell (disambiguation)

=== Australia ===
- Russell, Australian Capital Territory
- Russell Island, Queensland (disambiguation)
  - Russell Island (Moreton Bay)
  - Russell Island (Frankland Islands)
- Russell Falls, Tasmania
- A former name of Westerway, Tasmania

=== Canada ===
- Russell, Ontario, a township in Ontario
- Russell, Ontario (community), a town in the township mentioned above.
- Russell (Ontario federal electoral district), which existed from 1867 to 1968
- Russell, Manitoba
- Russell Island (Nunavut)

=== New Zealand ===
- Russell, New Zealand, formerly Kororareka
- Okiato or Old Russell, the first capital of New Zealand

=== Solomon Islands ===
- Russell Islands

=== United States ===
- Russell, Arkansas
- Russell City, California, formerly Russell
- Russell, Colorado
- Russell, Georgia
- Russell, Illinois
- Russell, Iowa
- Russell, Kansas
- Russell, Kentucky, in Greenup County
- Russell, Louisville, Kentucky
- Russell, Massachusetts, a New England town
  - Russell (CDP), Massachusetts, the main village in the town
- Russell, Minnesota
- Russell, New York
- Russell, North Dakota
- Russell Township, Ohio
- Russell, Portland, Oregon
- Russell, Pennsylvania
- Russell, Wisconsin (disambiguation)
- Russell County, Alabama
- Russell County, Kansas
- Russell County, Kentucky
- Russell County, Virginia
- Russell Island (Michigan)

=== Extraterrestrial ===
- Russell (lunar crater)
- Russell (Martian crater)

=== Electoral districts ===
- Russell (Ontario federal electoral district)
- Russell (Ontario provincial electoral district)
- Russell (Manitoba electoral district)

== Groups, companies, organizations ==
- Russell Investments, a subsidiary of the London Stock Exchange Group in Seattle
- Hotel Russell, London, UK; giving its name to the university group
- Russell Group, a group of British universities
- Russell Brands, an American sporting goods and clothing manufacturer
- Russell Stover Candies, an American manufacturer of confectionery (chocolate and candy)

== Transportation and vehicles ==
- Russell (locomotive), a locomotive of the Welsh Highland Railway
- Russell, a line of automobiles manufactured by the Russell Motor Car Company

=== Ships ===
- HMS Russell, five ships of the Royal Navy have carried this name
- USS Russell, two ships of the United States Navy have carried this name

== Other uses ==
- Jack Russell Terrier, a breed of dog
- Hertzsprung–Russell diagram, a scatter graph of stars
- Russell's paradox, in mathematics, a contradiction discovered by Bertrand Russell
- Russell's teapot, in mathematics, an analogy coined by Bertrand Russell
- Russell Indexes, a family of global equity indices

== See also ==
- Russel (disambiguation)
- Russellville (disambiguation)
