= Light rail in Canberra =

Light rail network in Canberra, Australia

Canberra light rail network

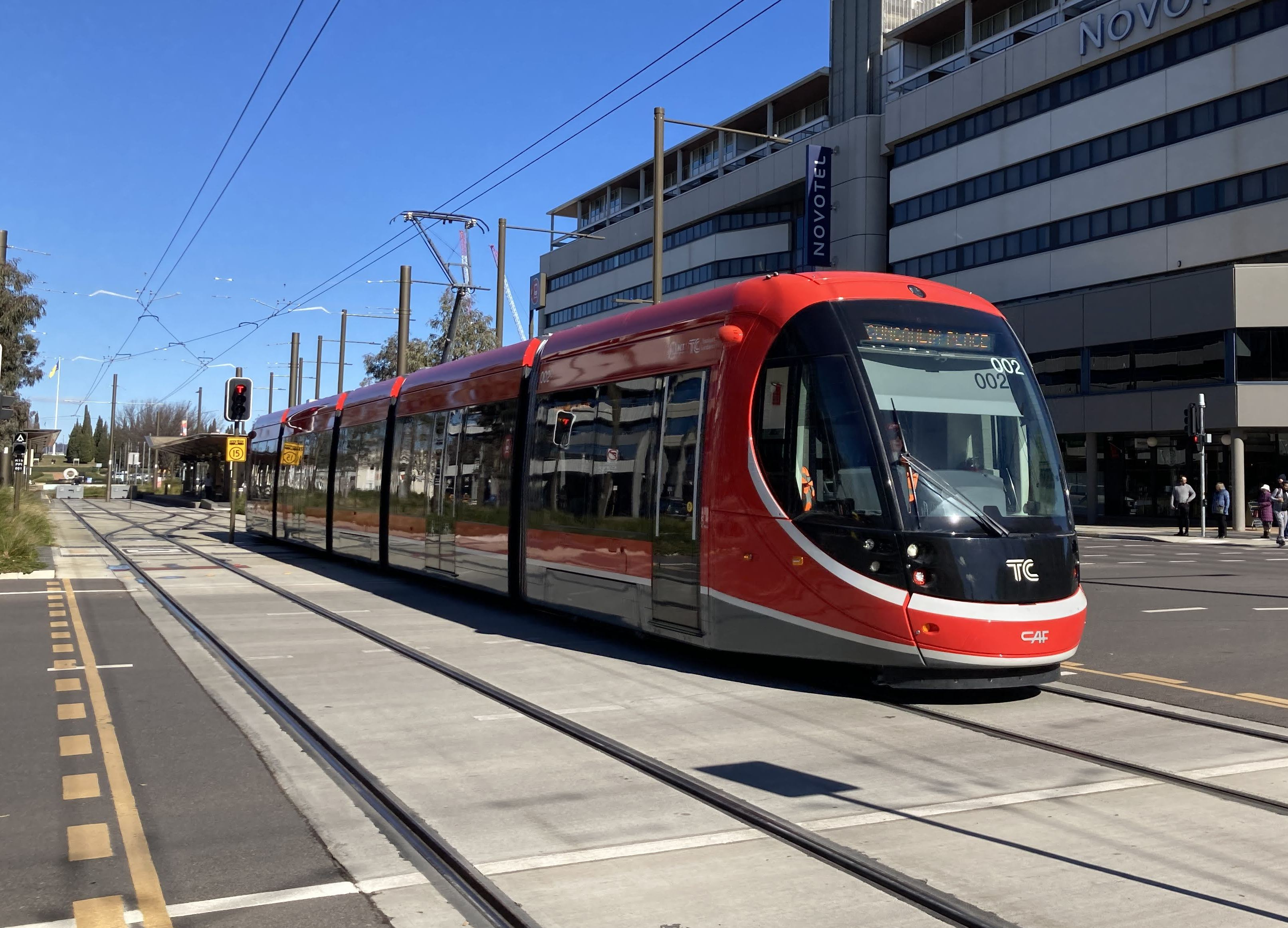
- An Urbos 3 departing Alinga Street

Overview
- Locale: Canberra, Australian Capital Territory
- Transit type: Light rail
- Number of lines: 1
- Line number: R1
- Number of stations: 14 (3 under construction)
- Annual ridership: 4,104,388 (2023)
- Headquarters: Mitchell
- Website: cmet.com.au

Operation
- Began operation: 20 April 2019
- Operator: Canberra Metro Operations (CMET)
- Number of vehicles: 19 CAF Urbos 3 trams
- Train length: 32.96 m (108.1 ft)
- Headway: 5-15 minutes

Technical
- System length: 12 km (7.5 mi)
- Track gauge: 1,435 mm (4 ft 8 1/2 in) standard gauge
- Electrification: 750 V DC overhead catenary
- Top speed: 70 km/h (43 mph)

The Canberra light rail line serves the city of Canberra, Australia. The initial 12-kilometre (7.5 mi) light rail line links the northern town centre of Gungahlin to the city centre (Civic) and has 14 stops. Services commenced on 20 April 2019. The 14th stop at Sandford Street in Mitchell commenced operation in September 2021.

An extension from Civic to Commonwealth Park (Stage 2A) is under construction and is expected to be operational in early 2028. Planning of a further extension from Commonwealth Park to Woden Town Centre (Stage 2B) via Capital Hill and Adelaide Avenue/Yarra Glen will continue while construction of Stage 2A is underway.

The route consists mainly of grade separated light rail tracks either in the vast wide medians of Canberra's avenues or in other land corridors. Heading over Lake Burley Griffin in between the twin bridges of the A23 Commonwealth Avenue and around Parliament House running next to State Circle and merging into the median of Adelaide Avenue and later Yarra Glen, terminating at the new Woden Interchange.

== History ==
=== Background ===
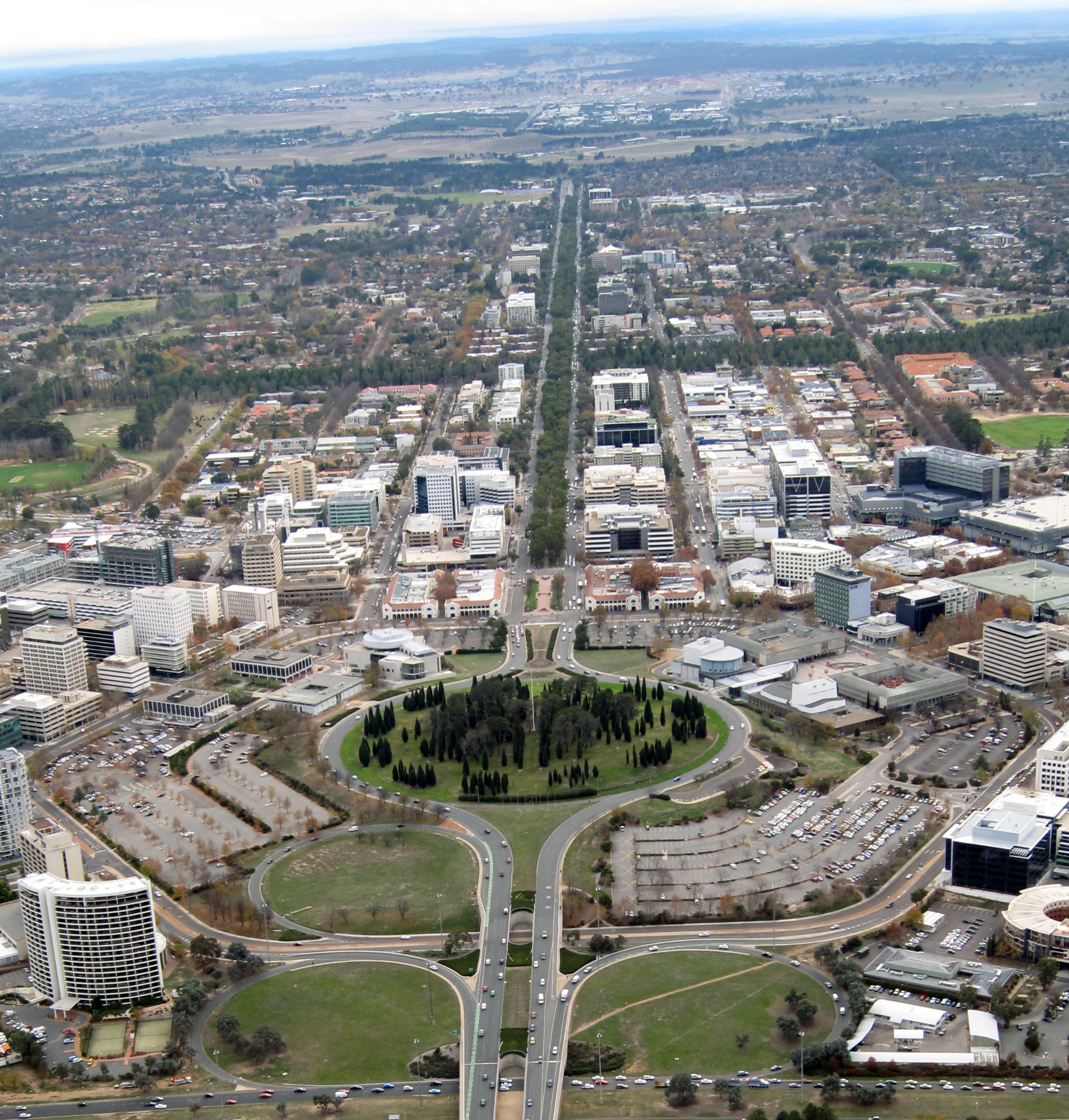
Aerial view of Northbourne Avenue, 2009, before construction of the light rail. Seen looking north from Civic, with City Hill in the foreground.

Walter Burley Griffin's master plan for Canberra proposed the construction of a tram network and a heavy rail line. However, excepting for the Canberra station, the city was exclusively served by buses from the 1926 introduction of the Canberra City Omnibus Service until the 2019 opening of light rail services.

In 1988, Comeng proposed a Light Rail system for Canberra. One line was proposed in three stages - Woden-City-Belconnen (about 18km), Woden-Tuggeranong (about 11.5km), and Belconnen-Kippax Centre (about 5.8km).

==== Government proposals before 2012 ACT election ====
In 1994, the Labor-led ACT Government commissioned a study into light rail, based on the findings of an independent report that light rail would be viable in Canberra by 1998. In its report, consultants Booz Allen Hamilton recommended a route from Belconnen to Barton via the City and Kings Avenue Bridge be operating by 1998; Woden to Barton by 2000; Tuggeranong to Woden by 2002; and Gungahlin to City by 2004. Routes to Canberra Airport and Queanbeyan received a lower priority. By January 1995, the Canberra Liberals announced their opposition to the light rail proposal, questioning the report's patronage figures and population projections for Canberra-Queanbeyan. In March 1995, the Canberra Liberals came to power and plans for a light rail system were discontinued.

In February 1998, the Canberra Liberals announced its support for the Federation Line, a proposed 7-kilometre (4.3 mi) line from the National Museum of Australia via Civic to the Australian War Memorial. This line was proposed to use heritage trams.

==== Proposal reached ====
Following the 2012 ACT election, ACT Labor needed the ACT Greens' support to remain in government. As part of their coalition agreement, the two parties agreed to the construction of Stage 1 of the light rail. Both parties had campaigned at the election in support of light rail.

The opposition Canberra Liberals opposed the project. In April 2015, the party announced it would cancel any contracts for the light rail if it won the 2016 ACT election. The light rail project was the major issue of the 2016 campaign. The Labor government was returned at the election, with the party claiming the result as an endorsement of the project.

=== Development and Stage 1 ===
In the 2013/14 ACT budget, $5 million was allocated for early design work. In September 2014, the business case was approved by the government. The project, known as Capital Metro during planning, was developed by the government agency Capital Metro Agency (CMA). The line was to be delivered under a public-private partnership.

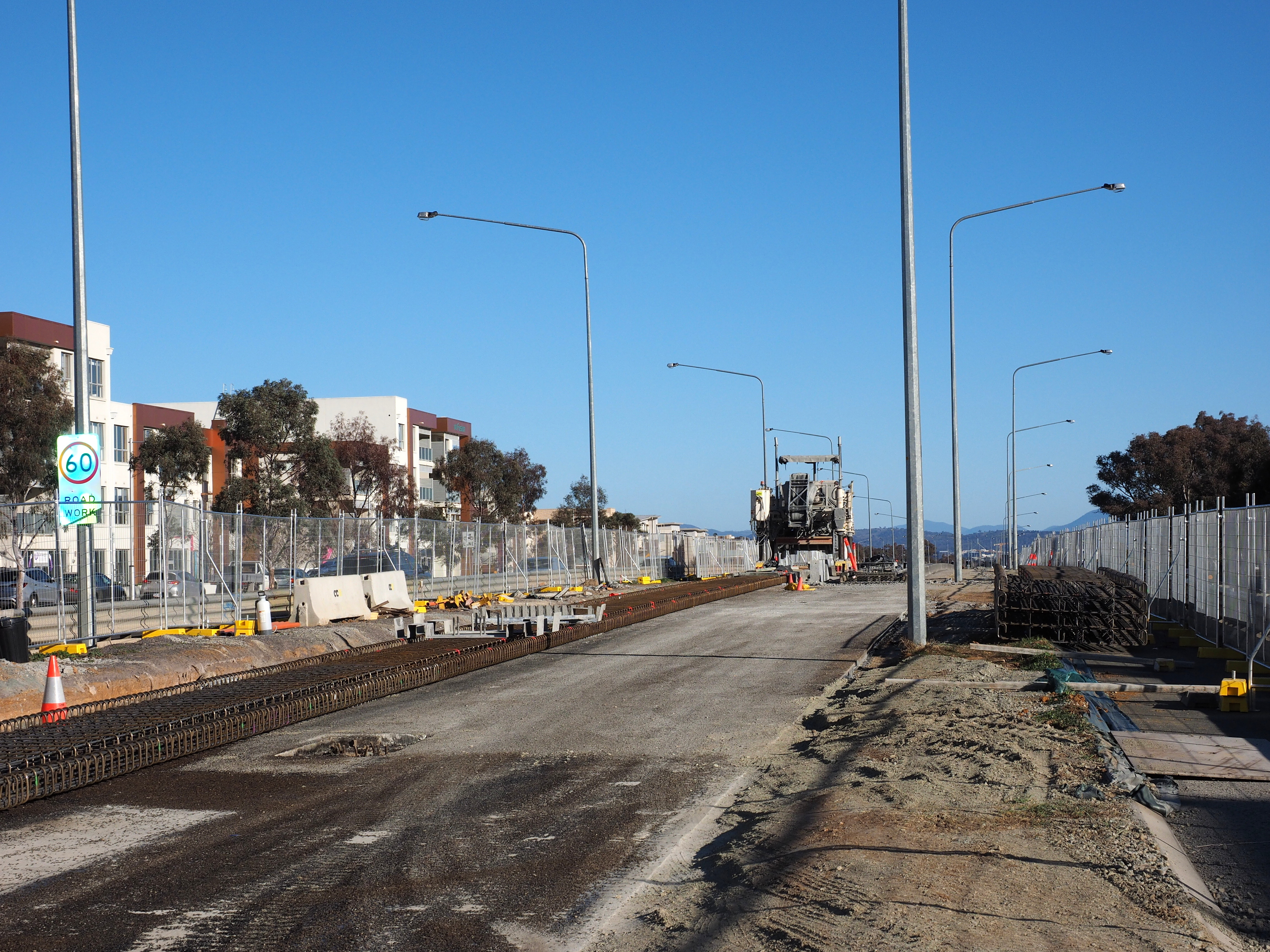
Light rail works in Franklin in July 2017

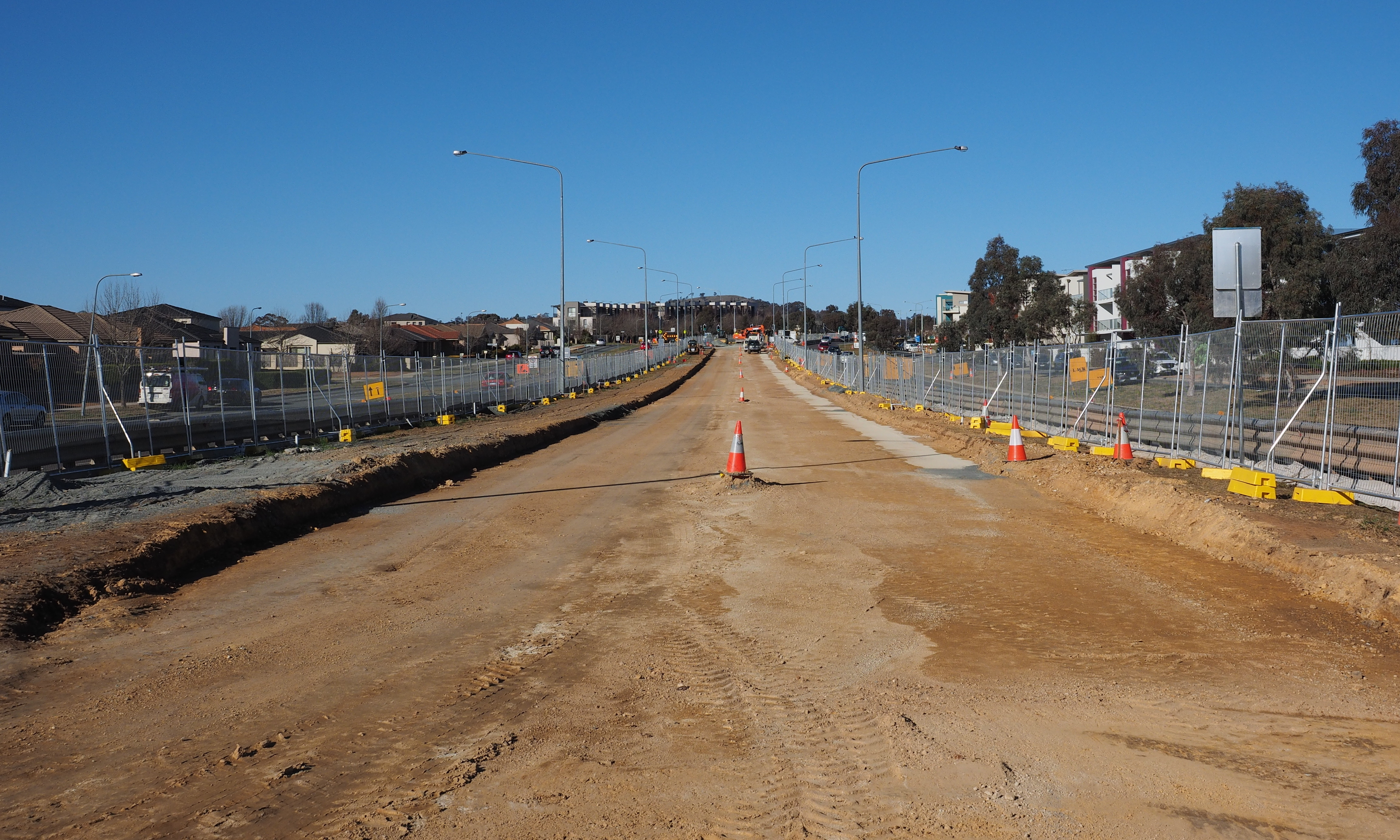
The centre of Flemington Road in Gungahlin after being cleared for light rail works in July 2017

In February 2016, after a tender process, the government announced that Canberra Metro consortium was the preferred tenderer and finalised the contract in May that year. Under the contract, Canberra Metro will operate and maintain the line for 20 years, after which ownership will pass to the ACT Government.

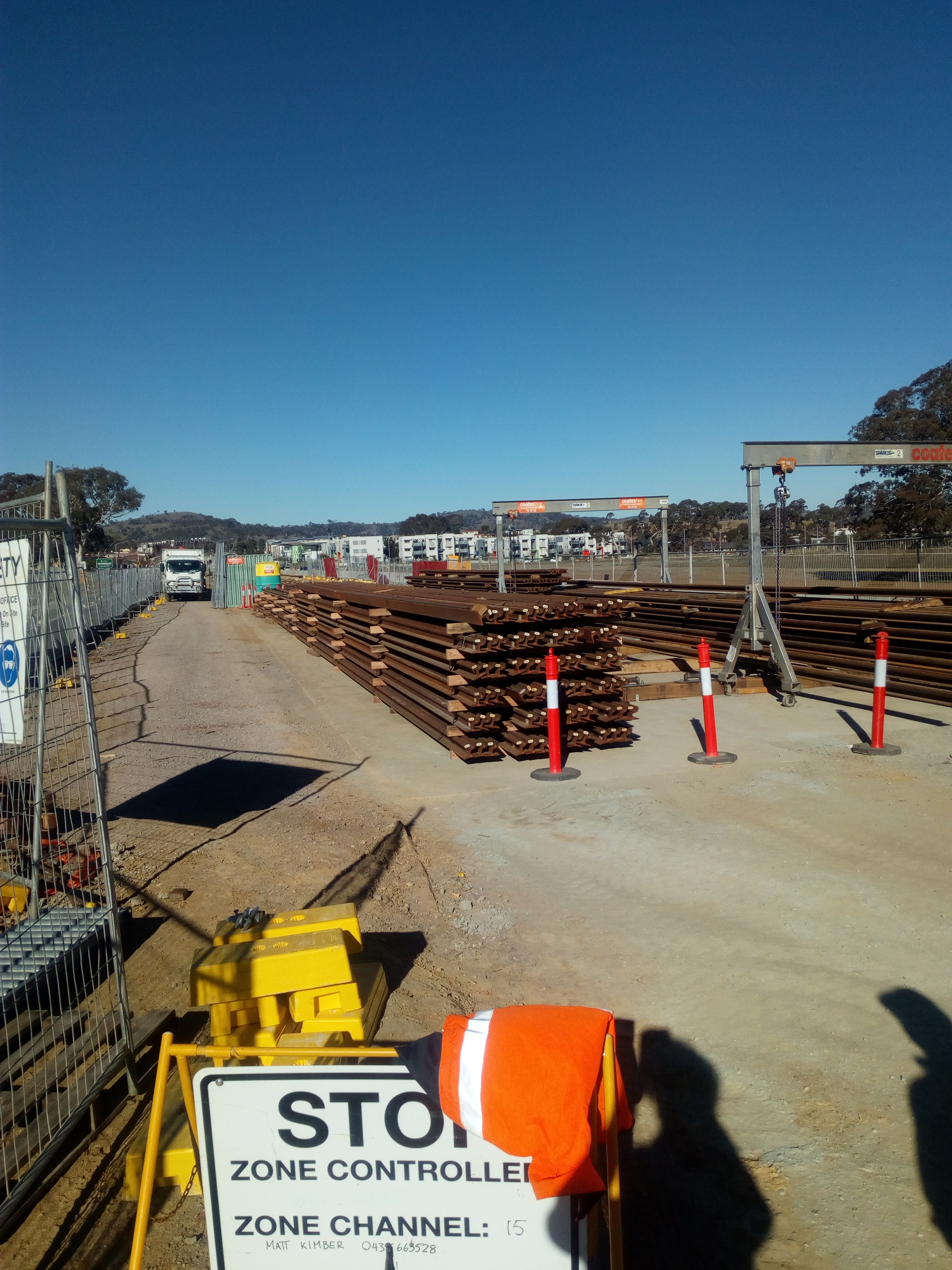
Stacked rails in Gungahlin in August 2017

Design and construction costs were budgeted at $707 million. The Federal Government contributed $67 million to the project. Commencement of construction was marked by a sod-turning in the northern suburb of Mitchell at the site of the depot on 12 July 2016. Major construction of the route itself began towards the end of the year.

The CMA was amalgamated into a new government directorate, the Transport Canberra & City Services (TCCS), on 1 July 2016, resulting in the responsibility for the project being transferred to the TCCS.

Testing of the line began in June 2018. A section in Gungahlin was electrified and one of the trams made trial runs. The last tram arrived in Canberra in September 2018 and it was hoped to have the project completed by the end of 2018. The light rail eventually opened on 20 April 2019, with the final construction cost for Stage 1 being $675 million, some $32 million under the original budget.

== Route ==
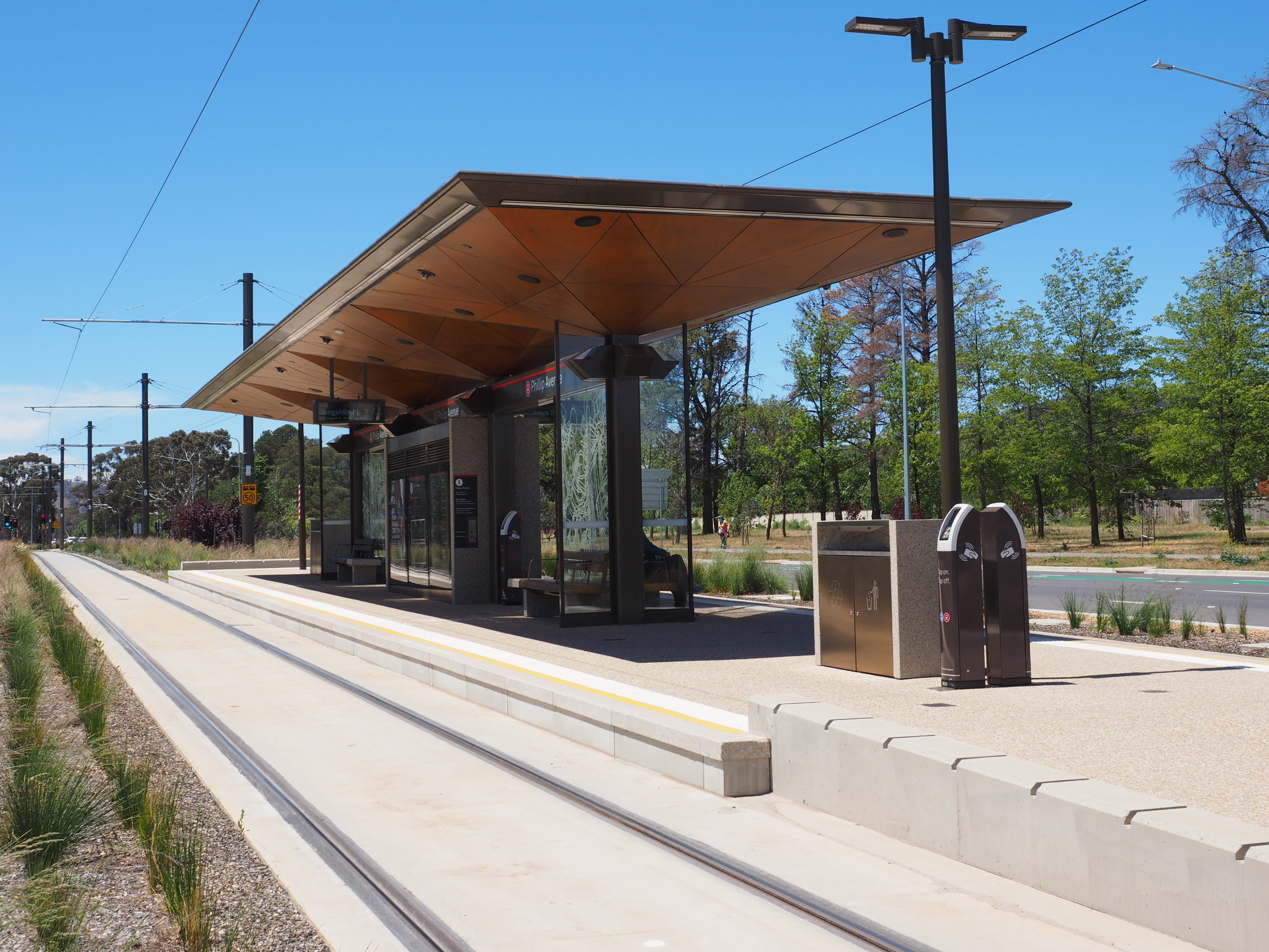
The Phillip Avenue light rail stop

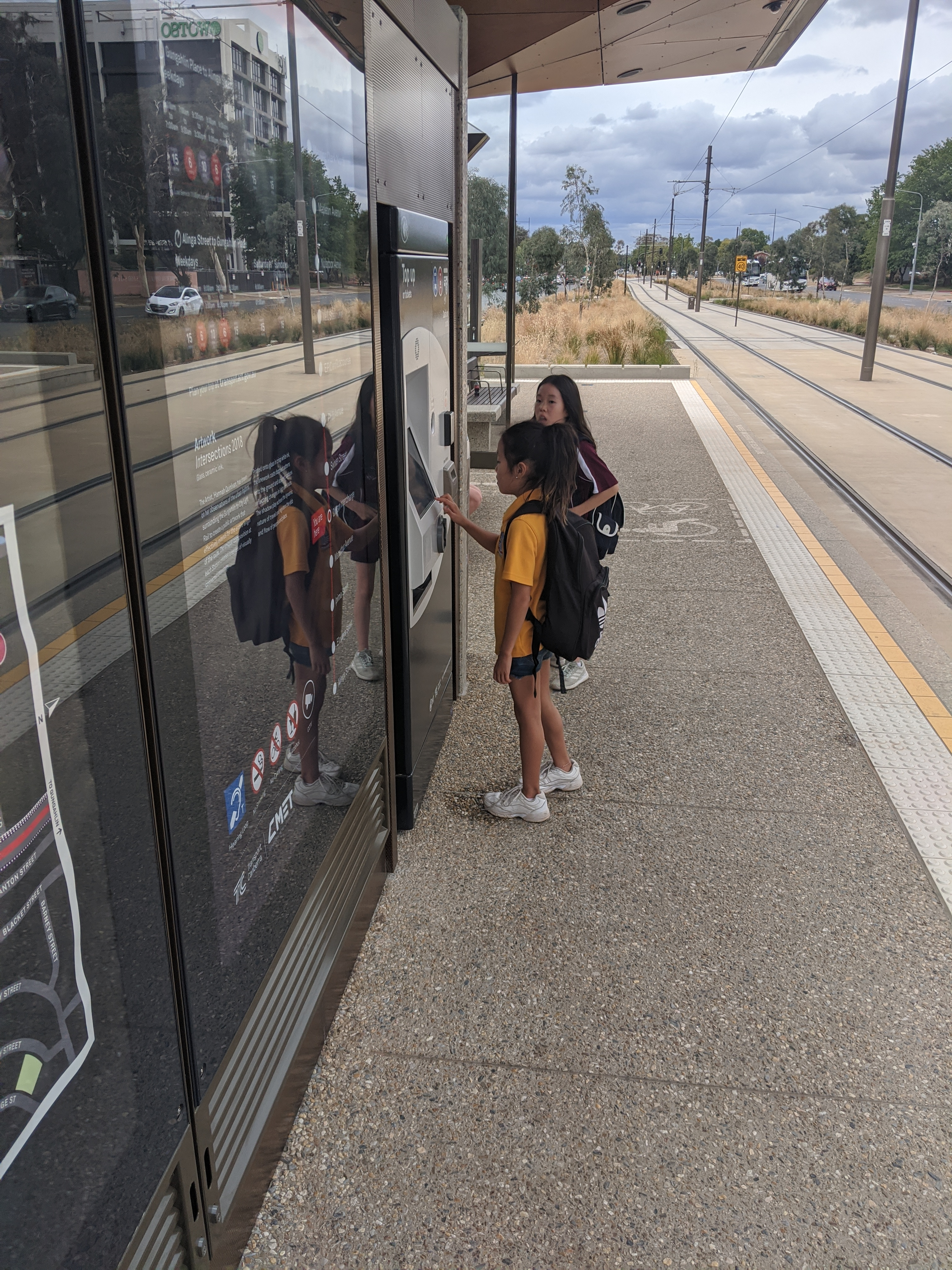
Each station has a ticket machine

The depot in Mitchell

The 12-kilometre (7.5 mi) line has its northern terminus at Hibberson Street in Gungahlin and follows Flemington Road, the Federal Highway and Northbourne Avenue to the southern terminus between Alinga and Rudd Streets in the City Centre. It is double track for its full length. Emergency crossovers are located to the south of the Dickson Interchange stop, as well as the north of the Nullarbor Avenue stop. There are 14 stops. The main bus interchanges are located at Gungahlin Place, Dickson Interchange and Alinga Street.

=== Stops ===
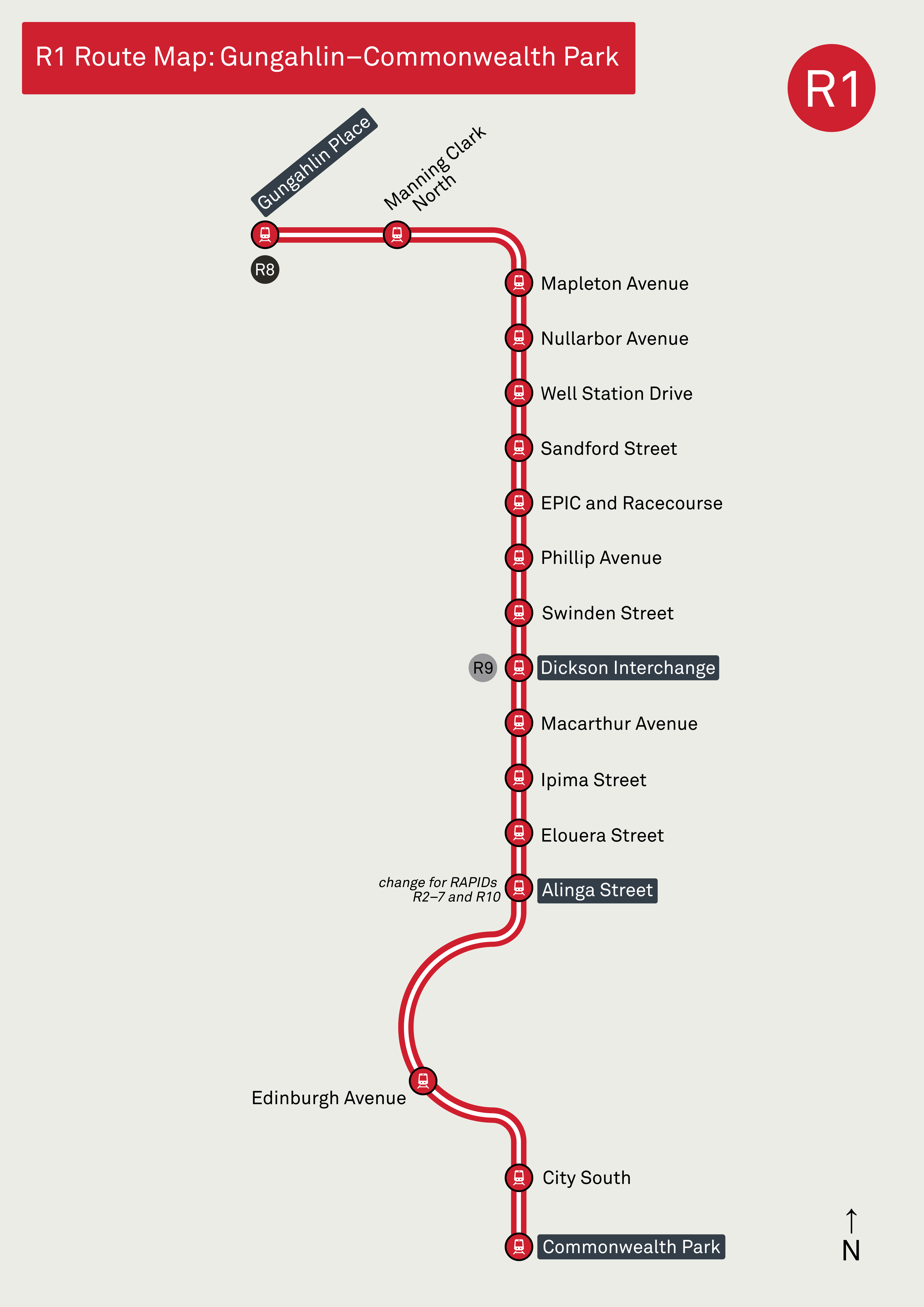
Diagram of R1 Canberra light rail (inclusive of Stage 2A)

Stop	Suburb	Platform layout	Coordinates	Refs.
Gungahlin Place	Gungahlin	Dual (Island & Side)	35°11′8.3″S 149°8′7.73″E	
Manning Clark North	Gungahlin	Island	35°11′13.15″S 149°8′36.14″E	
Mapleton Avenue	Franklin / Harrison	Island	35°11′36.17″S 149°9′3.5″E	
Nullarbor Avenue	Franklin / Harrison	Island	35°12′1.98″S 149°8′57.46″E	
Well Station Drive	Mitchell	Island	35°12′29.29″S 149°8′50.96″E	
Sandford Street	Mitchell	Island	35°13′17.8″S 149°8′40.8″E	
EPIC and Racecourse	Lyneham	Side	35°13′42.37″S 149°8′39.85″E	
Phillip Avenue	Lyneham / Watson	Island	35°14′8.86″S 149°8′38.14″E	
Swinden Street	Lyneham / Downer	Island	35°14′38.89″S 149°8′4.69″E	
Dickson Interchange	Lyneham / Dickson	Side	35°15′2.01″S 149°8′1.46″E	
Macarthur Avenue	Lyneham / Dickson	Side	35°15′36.57″S 149°7′56.02″E	
Ipima Street	Turner / Braddon	Side	35°15′57.23″S 149°7′52.62″E	
Elouera Street	Turner / Braddon	Side	35°16′21.42″S 149°7′48.62″E	
Alinga Street	Civic	Side	35°16′40.56″S 149°7′45.59″E	

The Sandford Street light rail stop commenced construction in 2020 and opened on 16 September 2021.

== Operation ==
Canberra Metro Operations logo

The service is operated by Canberra Metro Operations (CMET), in association with Deutsche Bahn Engineering and Consulting, under a 20-year contract. CMET is a joint venture between John Holland and Pacific Partnerships, both of whom are part of the Canberra Metro consortium.

CMET holds the contract to operate the light rail until at least 2036. Formed in 2016, it is a partnership between John Holland and Pacific Partnerships in association with Deutsche Bahn Engineering and Consulting. CMET commenced operations on 20 April 2019 with the completion of the first stage of the project.

The structure of the Canberra Metro Consortium

CMET is part of the Canberra Metro Consortium, acting as the operations component of the group, with both its owners also being equity providers. CMET does not contract with the ACT Government, rather it contracts with Canberra Metro PC Pty Limited (Canberra Metro) to provide service on its lines, which then contracts with the Canberra Metro Agency to manage the project and provide services to the city.

The contract specifies the following minimum service levels for hours of operation and service frequency:

Day	First service	Last service
Monday to Thursday	06:00	23:30
Friday and Saturday	06:00	01:00 the following day
Sunday	08:00	23:30
The last services from Gungahlin depart half an hour earlier. The first service from the city on Sunday departs half an hour later.

Day	Departure time	Frequency	
		To the city	To Gungahlin
Monday to Friday	06:00–07:00	15 minutes	15 minutes
Monday to Friday	07:00–07:30	6 minutes	10 minutes
Monday to Friday	07:30–09:00	6 minutes	6 minutes
Monday to Friday	09:00–16:00	10 minutes	10 minutes
Monday to Friday	16:00–17:30	6 minutes	6 minutes
Monday to Friday	17:30–18:00	10 minutes	6 minutes
Monday to Friday	After 18:00	15 minutes	15 minutes
Saturday	06:00–01:00	15 minutes	15 minutes
Sunday	08:00–23:00	15 minutes	15 minutes

=== Rolling stock ===
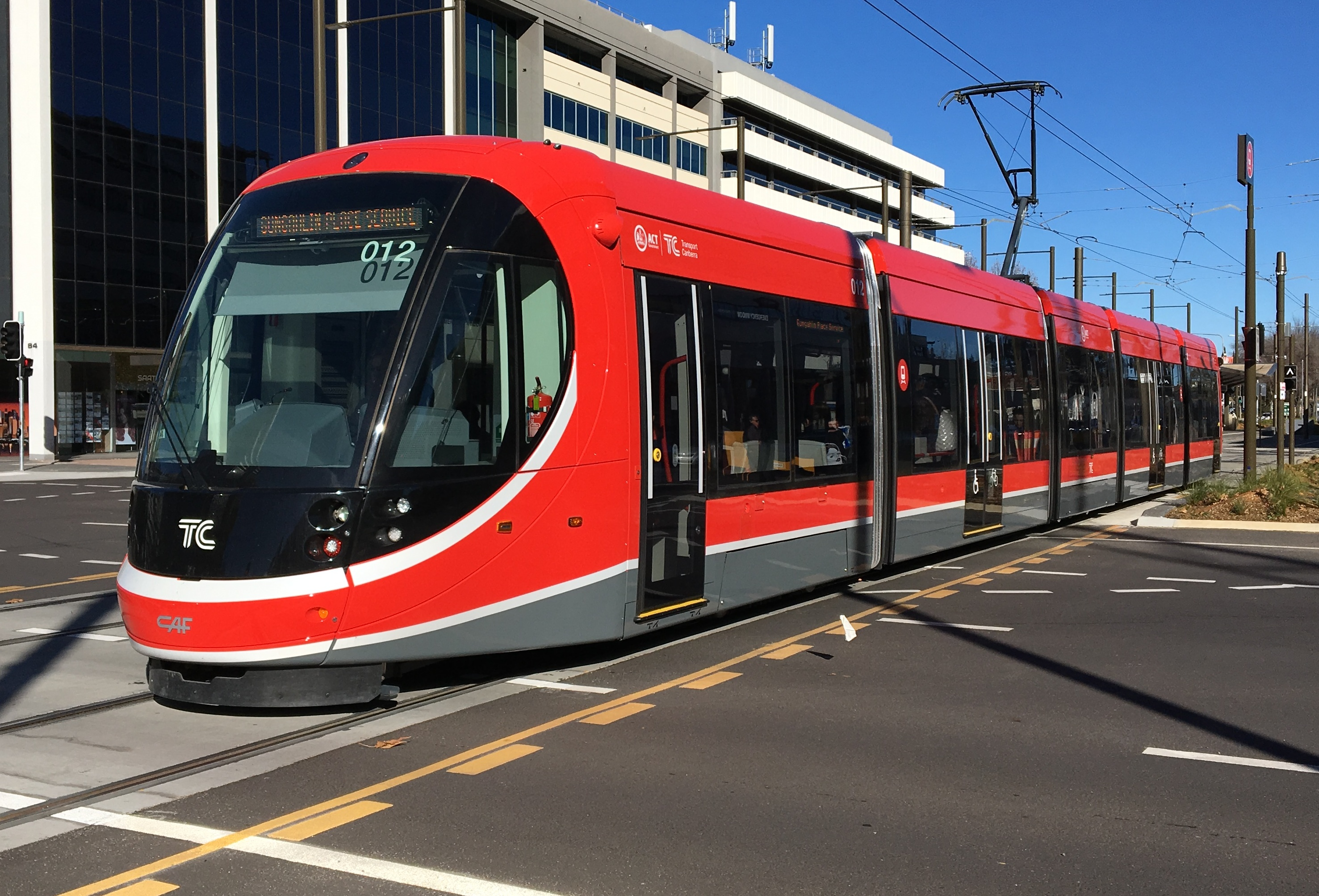
An Urbos 3 on Northbourne Avenue

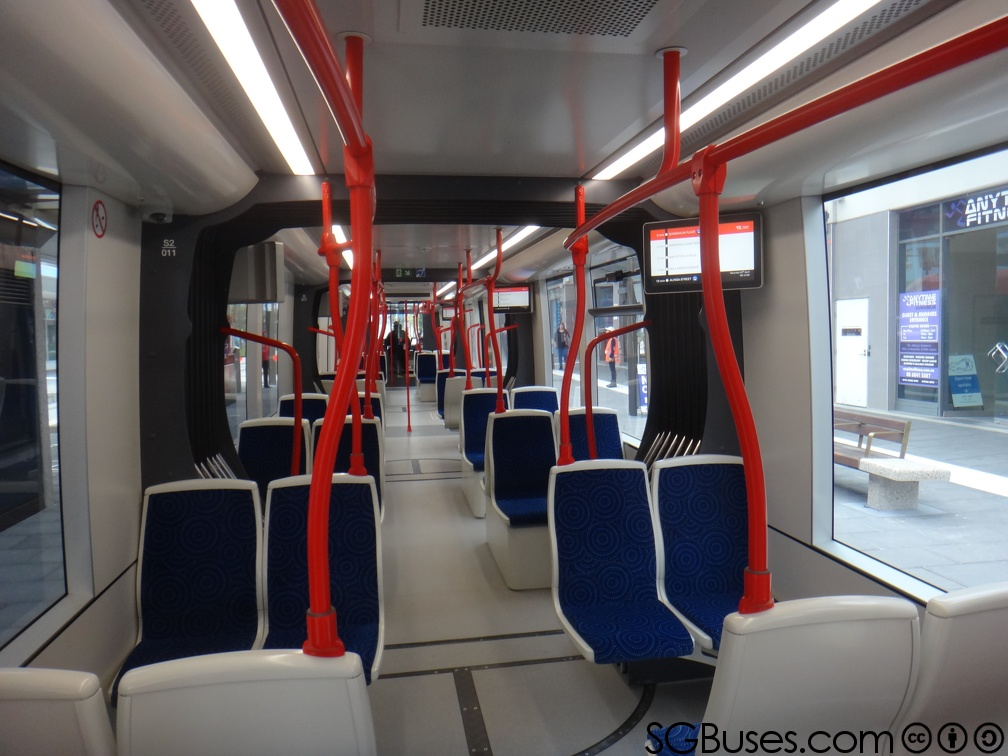
Interior

14 CAF-built Urbos 3 trams operate on the system. CAF will also provide twenty years of maintenance for the fleet. The trams are 32.96 m (108 ft 1.64 in) long and consist of five modules. There are four doors on each side of the vehicle, two single-leaf and two double-leaf doors. The first tram was delivered in December 2017. The vehicles feature a red and grey livery, with a white reflective stripe in the middle. The depot is located in Mitchell.

Five additional light rail vehicles were ordered from CAF ahead of the construction of Stage 2A. These vehicles are capable of wire-free running, as required by the National Capital Authority within its defined area. Deliveries began during 2024 and by January 2025, four were operational, with two in regular service.

=== Control system ===
Tehnika's t-visor RAIL platform, also used on the Gold Coast Light Rail, provides the operators with a single, centralised control system. This encompasses the automatic vehicle location, traffic signalling priority, traction power & infrastructure SCADA, CCTV and passenger information systems, amongst others.

== Stage 2 extension ==
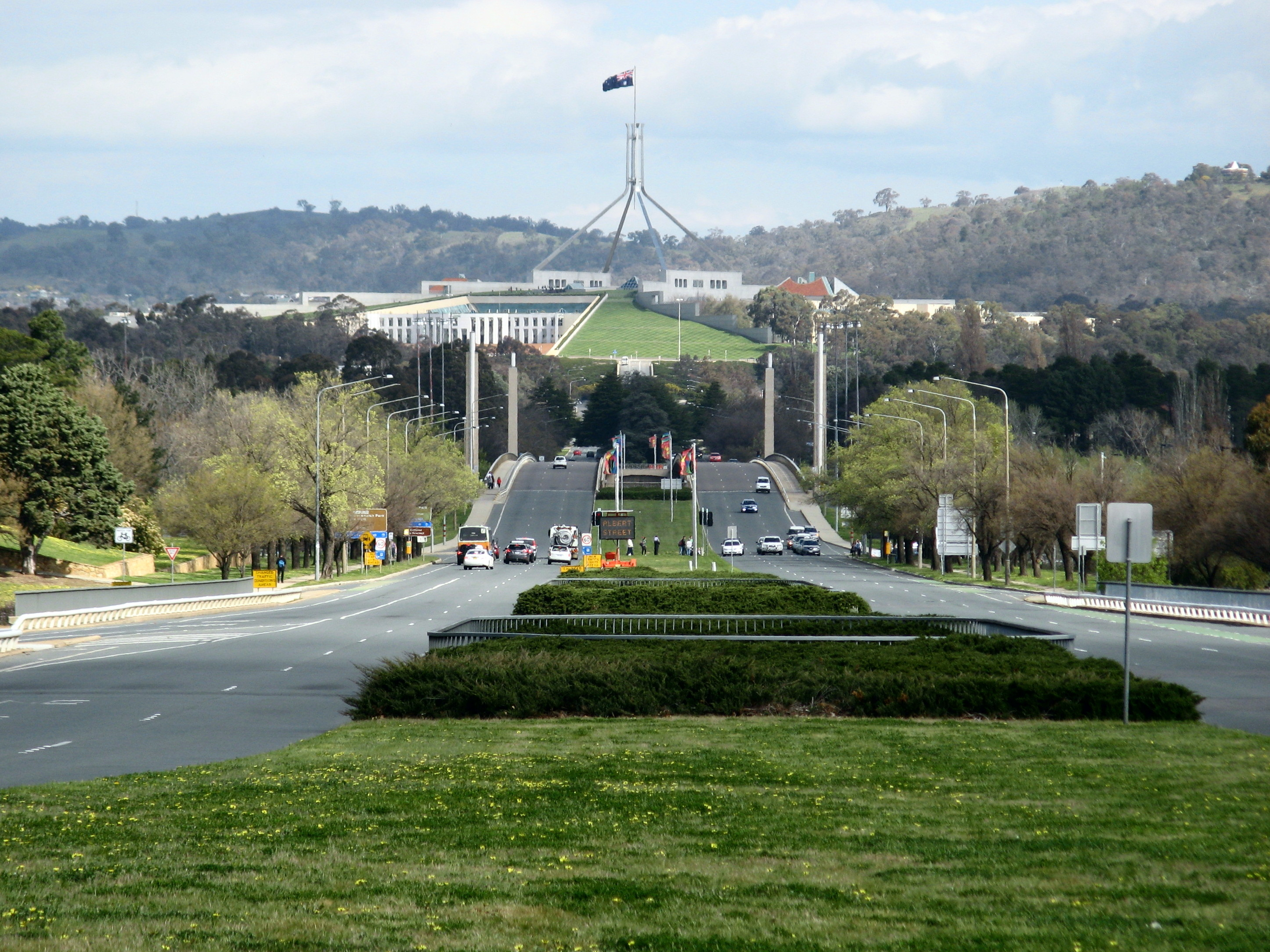
View of Commonwealth Avenue looking south from City Hill towards Parliament House. The hump in the middle distance is the bridge over Lake Burley Griffin, between which trams will travel if Stage 2B goes ahead.

=== Background ===
The consortia participating in the procurement process for the initial line were asked to develop plans for an expanded route from the City Centre to the Defence headquarters in Russell via London Circuit and Constitution Avenue. This additional 3.2-kilometre (2.0 mi) section was estimated to boost the patronage of the line as a whole by more than 30%. The proposal highlighted the desire of the Federal Government's National Capital Authority to use wire-free technology to power the trams in areas of the city under the authority's management.

The ACT Government decided not to proceed with the expanded route but committed to releasing a plan for a second stage of the light rail network (known as Stage 2) before the October 2016 territory election. It was considering extending the line not only to Russell but to the broader parliamentary triangle, possibly including Canberra Airport and the Australian National University.

=== Development of route and funding ===
In July 2016, the government released a shortlist of four potential routes that could form the second stage of the light rail network. The routes were:

- City to Canberra Airport via Constitution Avenue and Parkes Way
- City to Belconnen Town Centre via Barry Drive past Calvary Hospital and the University of Canberra
- City to the Parliamentary Triangle via either Commonwealth Avenue or Kings Avenue
- City to Mawson via Woden.

In September 2016, the government selected a truncated version of the Mawson route that ends at Woden as its preferred second-stage project. At that stage, the only firm decisions the government had made about the route were that it would run from Alinga Street to the Woden Town Centre and use Commonwealth Avenue Bridge to cross Lake Burley Griffin.

In July 2019, the ACT Transport minister Chris Steel announced that Stage 2 would be divided into two parts: Stage 2A from Civic to Commonwealth Park just before Lake Burley Griffin, and Stage 2B to continue from Commonwealth Park to Woden across the lake.

=== Stage 2A ===
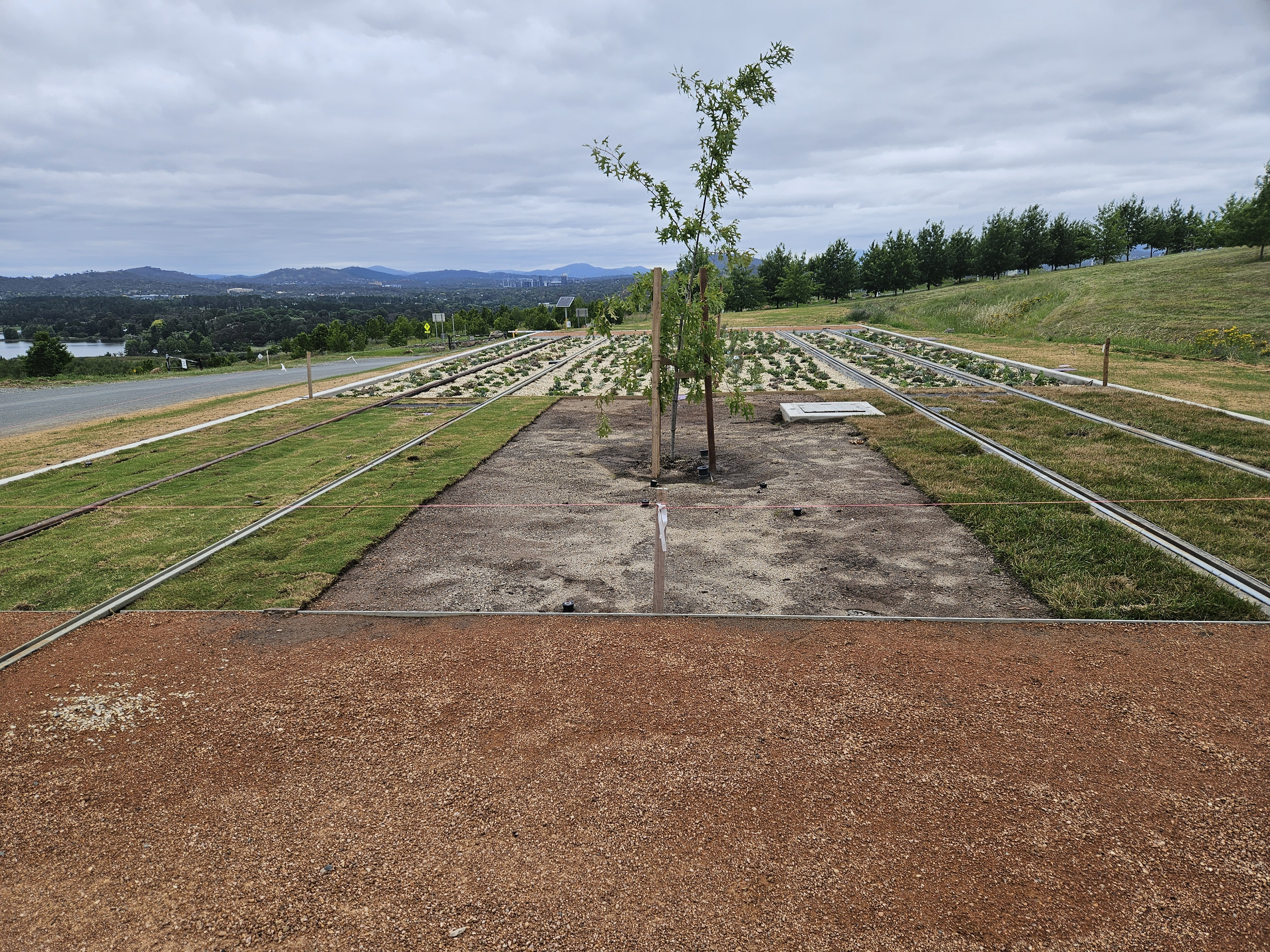
Parts of Stage 2A will contain green track. This is the prototype being tested at the National Arboretum

==== Business case ====
In September 2019, the ACT Government approved the business case for Stage 2A, confirming the three new stops on the route and the requirement for London Circuit to be raised at Commonwealth Avenue where the light rail will travel. According to the Stage 2A business case released the same month, from the Alinga Street Stop to the Commonwealth Park Stop will be about 6 minutes. This business case estimated that the stage would deliver an estimated $150 million in benefits, but with a capital cost of an estimated $268 million.

At the 2020 ACT election, the opposition Canberra Liberals expressed in-principle support for Stage 2, but did not commit to continuing the project. With the re-election of the Labor government at the election, Chief Minister Barr claimed a renewed mandate to continue Stage 2.

==== Ongoing construction ====
In November 2022, works to raise London Circuit commenced. These works reached "practical completion" in August 2025.

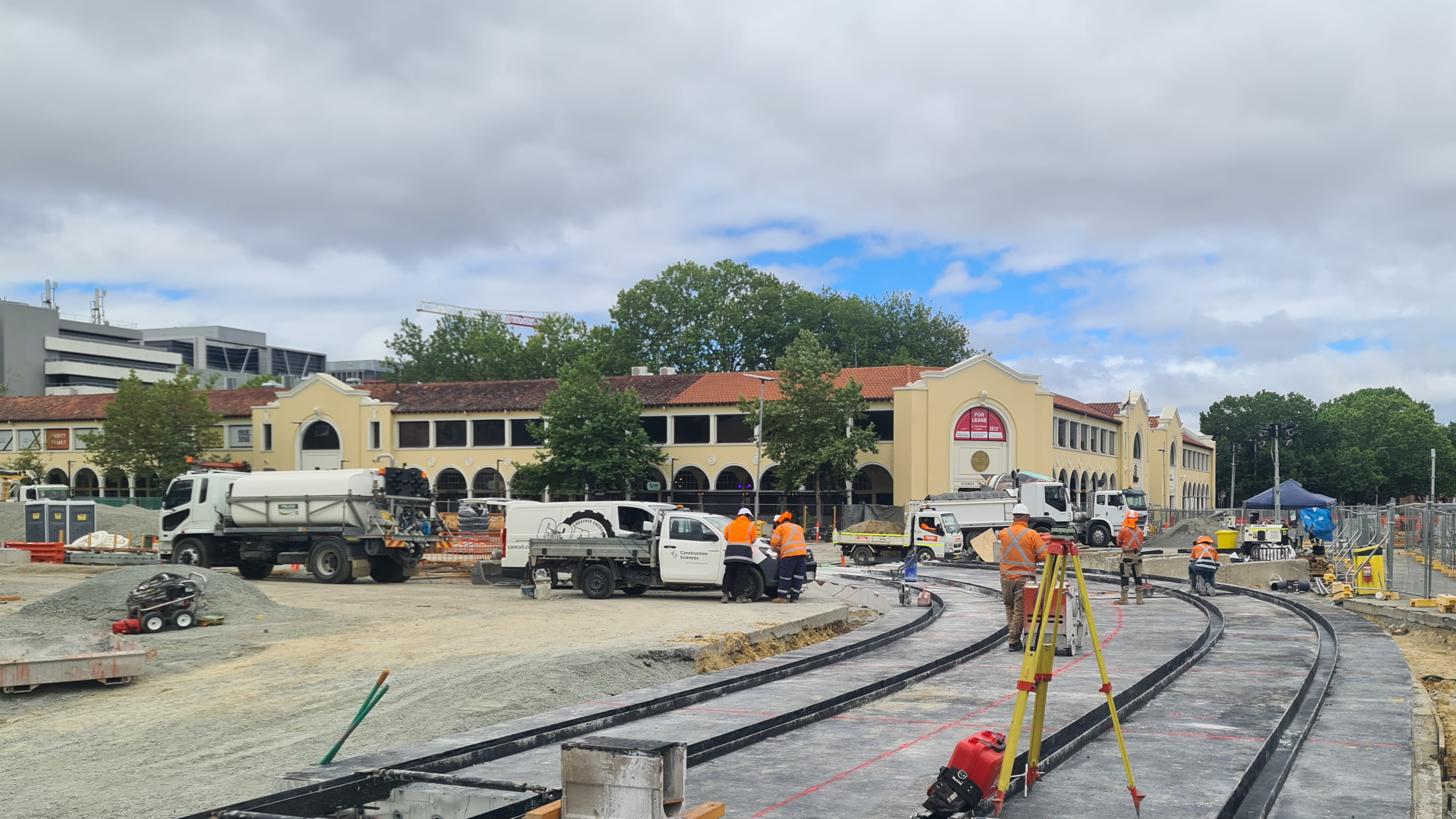
Light Rail Stage 2A works on the intersection of London Circuit and Northbourne Avenue in Civic during January 2026

In late 2024, wire-free rail vehicles began to be used on the Stage 1 route, in preparation for their use once the Stage 2A extension becomes operational.

In February 2025, with the raising of London Circuit nearing completion, construction of the trackwork for Stage 2A commenced under a $577 million government contract with Capital Metro. The extension is expected to be operational by early 2028.

By July 2026, all 19 vehicles were ready for battery-electric running while the reopening of parts of London Circuit was ten months ahead of schedule, with six to nine months of commissioning set to occur from early 2027.

By October 2026, the laying of the track slab had been completed, as well as works on the three new light rail stations. Rail turnouts were also completed at the Commonwealth Park station, which will allow the trams to cross from either track to the other, backwards or forwards.

=== Stage 2B ===
==== Consideration of route options ====
Stage 2B, if pursued, will cross over Commonwealth Avenue Bridge and then travel to Woden predominately via Adelaide Avenue and Yarra Glen.

In May 2017, design options for several sections of the route (not yet divided between Stages 2A and 2B) were presented to the public for comment. There were two options for the section between Lake Burley Griffin and Adelaide Avenue: a deviation to Barton with proposed stops at Old Parliament House, Brisbane Avenue and Sydney Avenue; or a more direct route via the Capital Circle. An alternate terminus that would have extended the route to the Canberra Hospital was dropped in December 2017.

Route options for Stage 2 presented in May 2017

Routes for the Woden extension presented in May 2017: Option 1 via State Circle (ultimately selected) Option 2 via Barton Alternative route through the city (not pursued) Alternative terminus at Canberra Hospital (not pursued)

The longer route via Barton (Option 2) was selected by the ACT Government as the preferred route in April 2018. In March 2019, the Commonwealth Government offered its support for the extension to Woden, however, it favoured a different path around Capital Hill, arguing for a route along the State Circle (Option 1). A delay in the federal government response meant planning work for the line was postponed, though choosing to not pursue the Barton route could mean a simpler regulatory process.

In May 2026, following public consultation, the ACT Government announced that it had chosen the State Circle route (Option 1). This will include the construction of a tunnel from Commonwealth Avenue to ease the gradient and curve for light rail vehicles entering State Circle.

==== Business case and regulatory approvals process ====
In 2018, prior to the splitting of Stages 2A and 2B, the ACT Government concluded that Option 1 of Stage 2 would cost $1,074.7 million and produce $589.5 million worth of benefits, whilst Option 2 would cost $1,008.4 million and produce $587.3 million worth of benefits. The Government did not publish that report until 2025.

The ACT Government's 2019 business case for Stage 2A included costs and benefit estimates for the whole of Stage 2. Those estimates implied that Stage 2B would cost $905 million and would produce $1,067 million worth of benefits.

In July 2019, the ACT Government submitted a referral for Stage 2B to the Australian Department of Environment and Energy.

== Potential further extensions ==
=== Stage 3: Belconnen to Canberra Airport ===
In October 2019, the ACT Government released its infrastructure plan which included stage 3 of light rail going from Belconnen to Canberra Airport via Civic, with the Civic–Belconnen section built first.

=== Stage 4: Woden to Tuggeranong ===
In October 2019, the ACT Government released its infrastructure plan which included stage 4 extending from Woden to Tuggeranong via Mawson.

=== Twenty-five-year vision ===
In October 2015, the ACT Government released a plan for a citywide light rail network that would be built over twenty-five years. The plan includes the following elements:

Corridor	Priority	Notes
Gungahlin to City	Complete	Stage One
Parliamentary Triangle	High	Connecting City to Russell, City to the Parliamentary Zone and Russell to the Parliamentary Zone.
Woden to City	High	Running via Adelaide Avenue.
Tuggeranong to Woden (Athllon Corridor)		Running either via the Athllon Drive Corridor or the existing rapid bus alignment along Erindale Drive
Eastern connections (Fyshwick and Canberra Airport)	High	Additions to the Parliamentary Triangle routes, from Russell to Canberra Airport and the Parliamentary Zone to Fyshwick.
Belconnen to City		Running via Southern Cross Drive and Barry Drive
Molonglo to City		Woden to City via Hindmarsh Drive, John Gorton Drive and Parkes Way

== Political opposition and debate ==
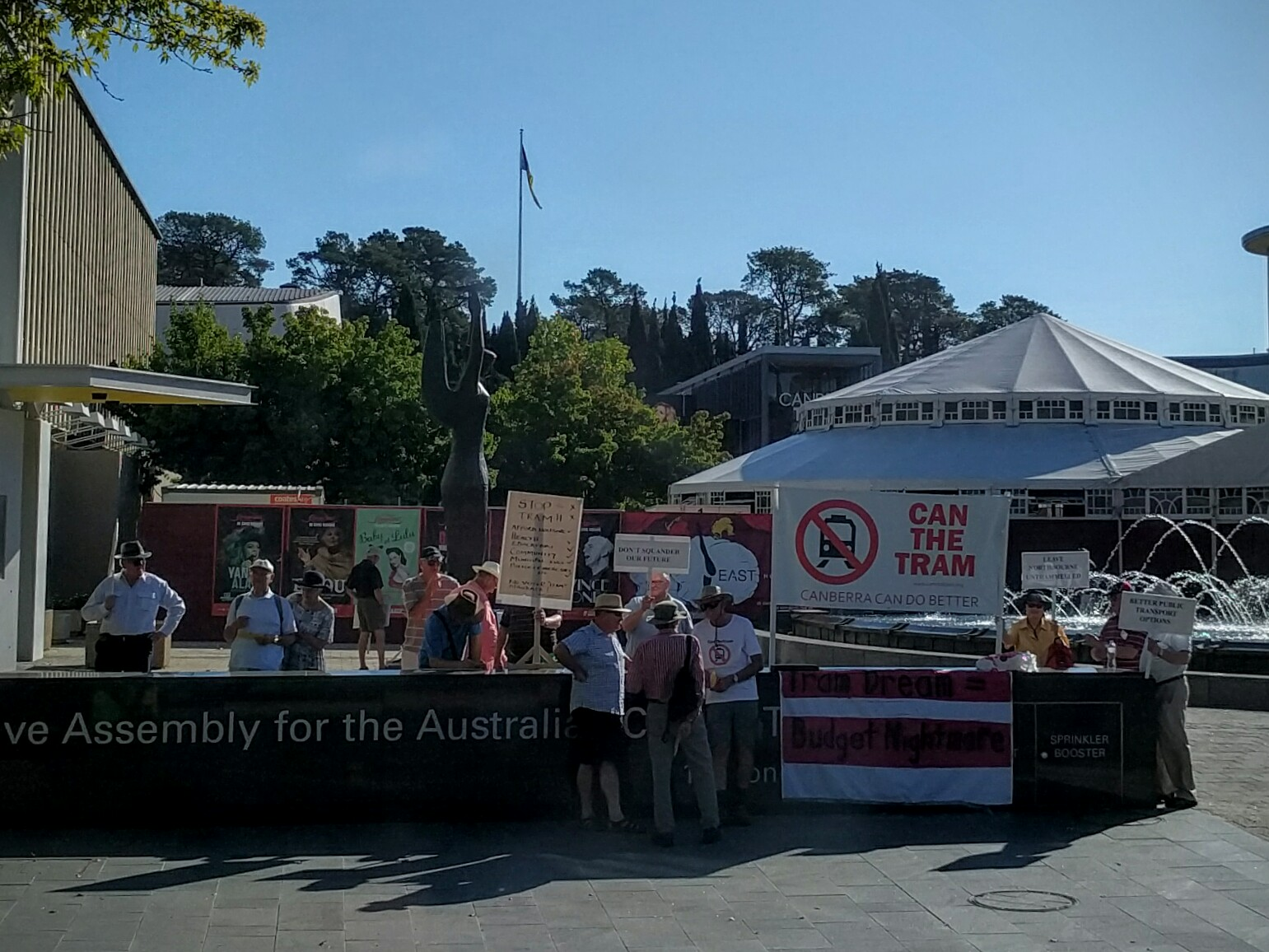
A protest against the light rail being constructed in March 2016

In April 2024, the Canberra Liberals proposed an alternative from the ACT Government’s plans to extend the light rail network between the City and Woden. Instead, they suggested the establishment of dedicated bus lanes along the same corridor, presenting it as a more practical and financially responsible alternative to the proposed rail system. This proposal aimed to address growing public concerns about the cost, feasibility and long-term implications of the light rail extension, sparking widespread debate about the future of Canberra’s transport infrastructure.

The Canberra Liberals argued that dedicated bus lanes would deliver substantial improvements in public transport connectivity and efficiency while avoiding the high upfront costs associated with light rail construction. Unlike light rail, which requires extensive investment in fixed infrastructure such as tracks, overhead wiring and stations, dedicated bus lanes could be implemented using existing roads with comparatively minor modifications. This, they contended, would make the project more cost effective and achievable within a shorter timeframe.

However, their proposal was not without its critics. Advocates of the light rail extension pointed to the long-term benefits of rail infrastructure, which they argued went beyond immediate transport needs. Light rail, they contended, has the potential to reshape urban development patterns by encouraging higher-density housing and commercial activity along its corridors. This, in turn, could reduce urban sprawl, lower carbon emissions and create more vibrant, walkable communities. Proponents also argued that light rail’s fixed infrastructure gives it an edge in attracting investment and instilling confidence in businesses and residents, who view it as a permanent and reliable form of transport.

The Public Transport Association of Canberra described the Canberra Liberals busway plan as an "incredibly poor substitute", because there would be no dedicated bus lanes on Commonwealth Avenue, leaving buses still stuck in traffic, with no reliability improvements.

Environmental considerations also played a role in the debate. While buses are increasingly adopting cleaner technologies such as electric and hydrogen fuel cells, light rail remains a zero-emission option powered by electricity. Supporters of the light rail extension highlighted its potential to reduce Canberra’s overall carbon footprint, contributing to the city’s ambitious climate change goals. They questioned whether a bus-based system could achieve the same level of sustainability in the long run.

In its budget submission, Public Transport Association of Canberra expressed support for expanding the light rail network to include the airport. The association advocated for extensions as a means to reduce transport emissions and provide a sustainable, efficient travel option for airport passengers.
