= Canberra Centenary Column =

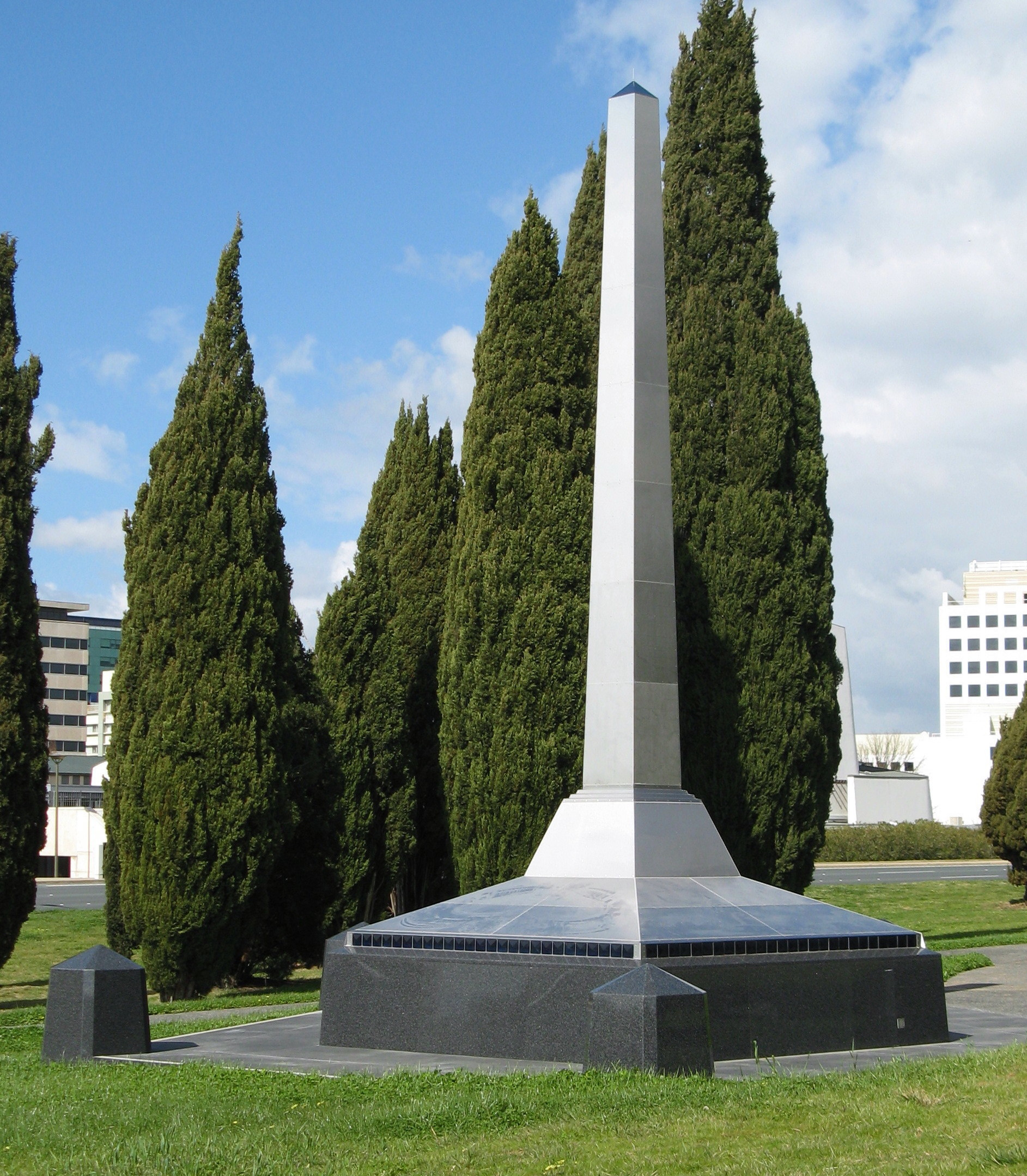
- Interactive map of Canberra Centenary Column
- Location: City Hill, Canberra
- Coordinates: 35.28143°S 149.12921°E
- Designer: Geoff Farquhar-Still
- Type: Obelisk
- Material: Stainless steel, granite, glass
- Width: 5 metres (16 ft)
- Height: 8.5 metres (28 ft)
- Opening date: 2014-03-11

The Canberra Centenary Column is a sculpture in City Hill, Canberra, Australia. It was built to commemorate the city's centenary, and unveiled on 11 March 2014.

The sculpture is an 8.5-metre (28 ft) stainless steel obelisk on a 5-metre-wide (16 ft) granite-dressed concrete base. The top of the base is inlaid with glass tiles and has a steel covering etched with images depicting Canberra's 100-year history. It was designed and fabricated by local artist Geoff Farquhar-Still with his team of artisans at Artillion Studio. The design was inspired by the "Commencement Column" that was proposed to have been built when Canberra was founded, but was never completed. (Note: The Commencement Column was to have been built on three foundation stones that were laid in 1913 to mark the founding of Canberra. The column was never constructed; the foundation stones have since been moved, and are included on the Commonwealth Heritage List.)

Encased in the base is a time capsule containing one hundred objects, both symbolic and mundane. The time capsule is intended to be opened in 100 years, during Canberra's bicentenary. The ACT Heritage Library and the National Film and Sound Archive have catalogues of the capsule's contents, and copies of some of the items.
