= Russell Island =

Russell Island may refer to:

- Russell Island (British Columbia), Canada, one of the Gulf Islands
- Russell Island (Frankland Islands), in Queensland, Australia
- Russell Island (Michigan), United States
- Russell Island (Moreton Bay), in Queensland, Australia
- Russell Island (Nunavut), Canada
- Russell Island (Ontario), Canada, in Lake Huron
- Russell Island, Bahamas

== See also ==
- Russell Islands, an island group in the South-Western Pacific
