= Lord Russell =

Lord Russell is a form of address used for several different members of the English family of Russell, including:

== Descendants of Dukes of Bedford ==
- The heir apparent, past or present, to the Earl or Duke of Bedford (the Baron Russell of Cheneys); the other sons of a Duke of Bedford are called Lord [Forename] Russell

Heirs apparent

- Francis Russell, Lord Russell (died 1585), son of 2nd Earl, MP for Tavistock
- William Russell, Lord Russell (1639–1683), son of 5th Earl, MP for Tavistock and Bedfordshire

Others

- Bertrand Russell (1872–1970), philosopher, mathematician, social critic, and pacifist
- John Russell, 1st Earl Russell (1792–1878), British Prime Minister
- Lord George Russell (1790–1846), British soldier, politician and diplomat
- Lord Odo Russell (1829–1884), British diplomat
- Lord William Russell (1767–1840), MP for Surrey and Tavistock
- Lord Arthur Russell (1825–1892), MP for Tavistock

== Other people ==
The name may also refer to:

- Albert Russell, Lord Russell (1884–1975), MP for Kirkcaldy

== Other uses ==
- Earl Russell
- Baron Russell of Killowen
- Baron Russell of Liverpool
- Baron Russell of Thornhaugh
- Lord Russell-Johnston
- Baron Ampthill, the title granted to Lord Odo Russell

== See also ==
- Russell (disambiguation)
- Lady Russell
