= Lady Russell =

Lady Russell may refer to:

== People ==
- Female consorts and children of Lord Russell (disambiguation)
  - Elizabeth Cooke, Lady Russell (1528–1609) member of Gloriana's court, wife of the heir of the Earldom of Bedford
  - Rachel Russell, Lady Russell (1636–1723) wife of Lord Russell of the Monmouth Rebellion
- Gentlewomen and aristocrats with the surname Russell (surname)

== Fictional characters ==
- Lady Russell, a character from the 1817 Jane Austen novel Persuasion (novel)

== See also ==
- Russell (disambiguation)
