= Russell, Wisconsin =

Russell is the name of some places in the U.S. state of Wisconsin:

- Russell, Bayfield County, Wisconsin, a town
- Russell, Lincoln County, Wisconsin, a town
- Russell, Sheboygan County, Wisconsin, a town
- Russell, Trempealeau County, Wisconsin, an unincorporated community
