= Russell Island (Nunavut) =

Uninhabited island in the Arctic Archipelago

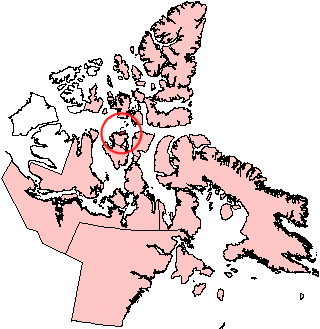

- Location within Nunavut Location within Canada

Geography
- Location: Parry Channel
- Coordinates: 74°00′N 98°25′W
- Archipelago: Arctic Archipelago
- Area: 940 km^{2} (360 sq mi)
- Highest elevation: 240 m (790 ft)

Administration
- Canada
- Territory: Nunavut
- Region: Qikiqtaaluk

Demographics
- Population: Uninhabited

Russell Island is an uninhabited island of the Arctic Archipelago in the Qikiqtaaluk Region of Nunavut, Canada. It is located in the Parry Channel, separated from the northern tip of Prince of Wales Island by the narrow Baring Channel. The western third of the island is separated from the other two thirds by a narrow lake and its outlet. At the northern end of the lake there is an isthmus just 1.1 km (0.68 mi) wide and this joins the two parts of the island. With a total area of 940 km^{2} (360 sq mi), it is the largest island offshore of Prince of Wales Island.

William Edward Parry was the first European to sight the island in 1819.

Another, much smaller Russell Island lies off the northwest tip of Devon Island. A third one lies in the West Foxe Islands, in Hudson Strait, southwest of Alareak Island.
