= Northbourne Avenue =

Road in Canberra, Australia

Northbourne Avenue Australian Capital Territory
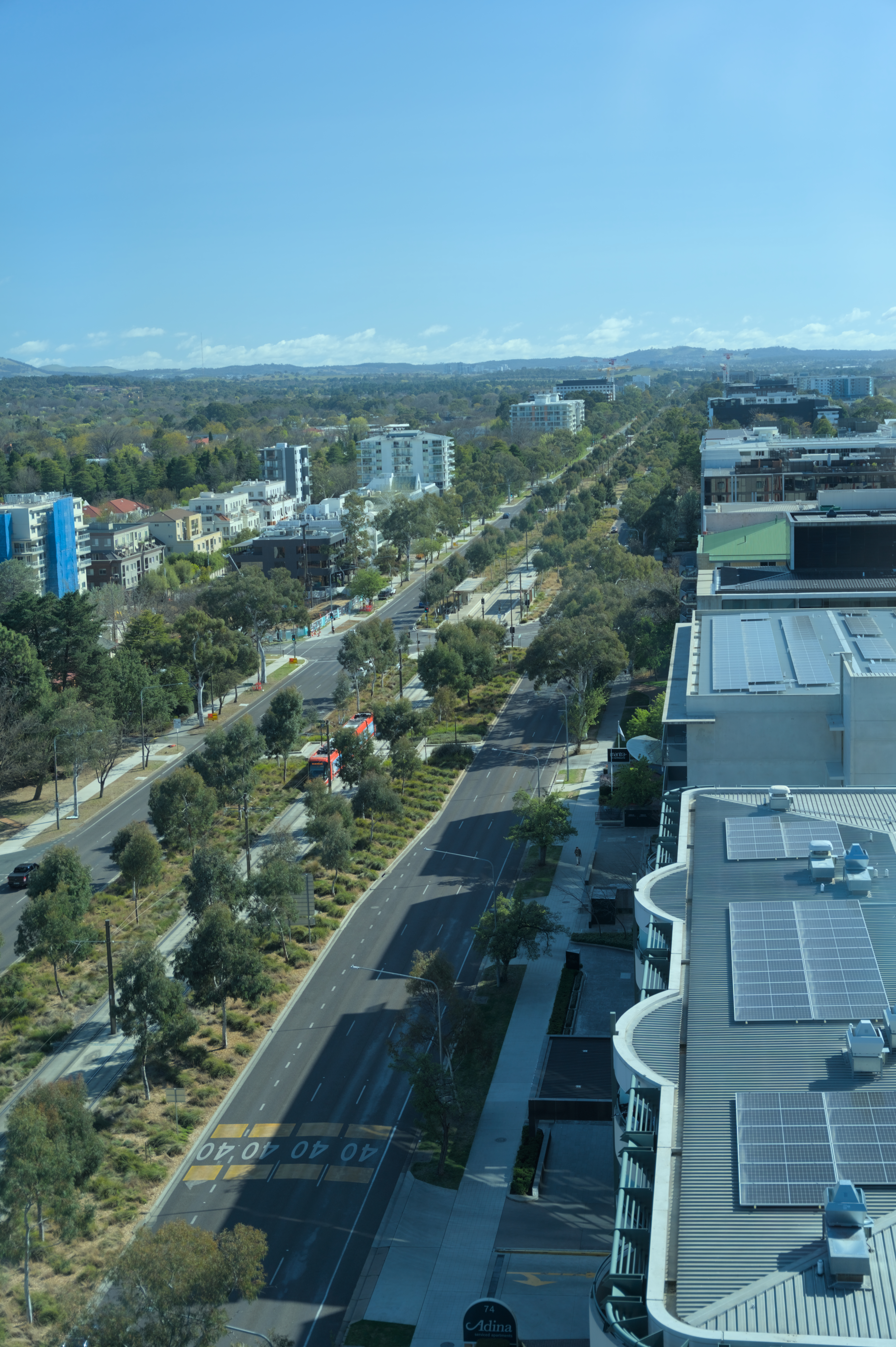
- Looking north along Northbourne Avenue, viewed from the top floor of Civic Quarter 2
- Coordinates: 35.2608°S 149.132°E

General information
- Type: Highway
- Length: 4.52 km (2.8 mi)
- Gazetted: 20 September 1928
- Route number(s): A23 (2013–present)
- Former route number: National Route 23 (1955–2013) (Entire route); ACT Tourist Drive 1 (through Civic); ACT Tourist Drive 2 (Civic–Turner); ACT Tourist Drive 4 (through Lyneham); ACT Tourist Drive 7 (Civic–Turner)

Major junctions
- South end: Vernon Circle; Civic, Australian Capital Territory
- London Circuit; Barry Drive; Cooyong Street; Macarthur Avenue; Wakefield Avenue; Mouat Street; Antill Street; Barton Highway
- North end: Federal Highway; Lyneham, Australian Capital Territory

Location(s)
- Major suburbs: Civic, Braddon, Turner, Dickson, Lyneham, Downer

Highway system
- Highways in Australia; National Highway • Freeways in Australia; Road infrastructure in Canberra

Northbourne Avenue is a major road in Canberra, Australia. It extends from City Hill in the south, to the Federal Highway in the north.

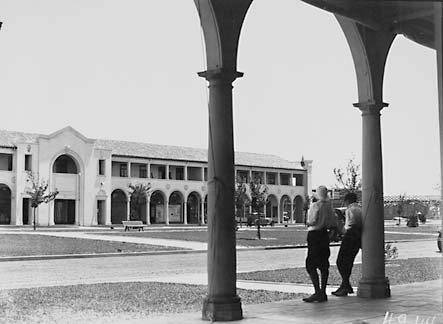
Sydney and Melbourne buildings, City, either side of Northbourne Avenue in 1929. Commenced building 1920s and completed 1946; for many years the only commercial buildings in the city.

It is a north–south running road which has three lanes for motorised traffic, and one lane for bicycles running in each direction, with a large median strip containing a light railway line between rows of trees. The speed limit is 60 km/h north of Barry Drive. Civic contains a 40 km/h zone with multiple fixed red light/speed cameras and mobile speed cameras operating along the entire length of the road.

Northbourne Avenue is the dividing line between the suburbs of Turner and Lyneham on the west, with the suburbs of Braddon, Dickson and Downer on the east.

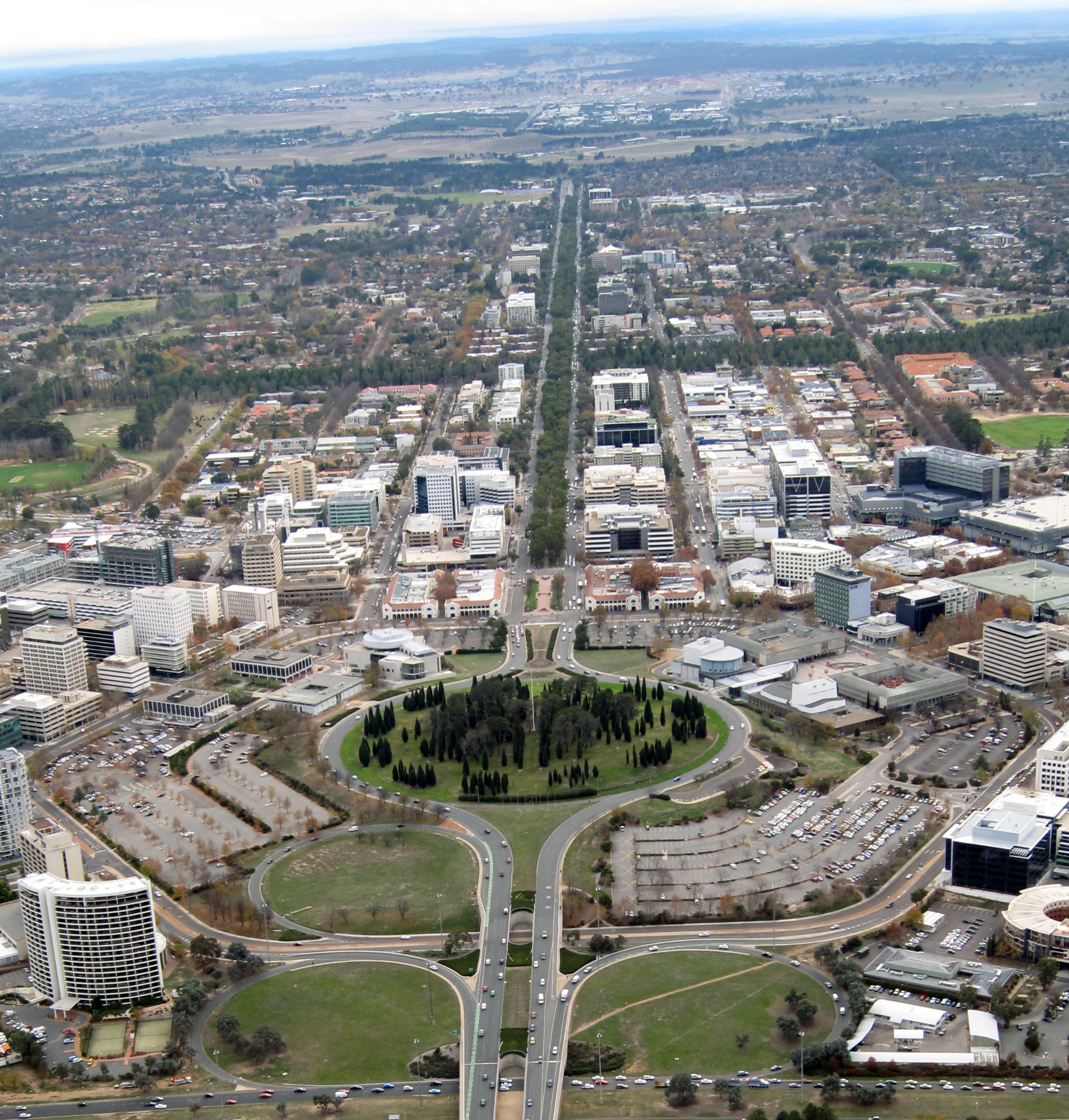
2009 aerial view of Northbourne Avenue looking north from Civic. City Hill is in the foreground.

Many ACTION buses travelling between City and Dickson, Gungahlin or Belconnen used the road, which had many bus stops along it until the light rail line along the median strip opened in April 2019.

Northbourne Avenue was planted with Eucalyptus elata (river peppermint gums) between 1983 and 1986, the third generation of Eucalyptus on the road. The previous generation was Corymbia maculata (spotted gums). The river peppermint gums were cleared for Capital Metro and replanted with Eucalyptus mannifera (brittle gums).
