= London Circuit =

Road in Canberra, Australia

London Circuit Australian Capital Territory
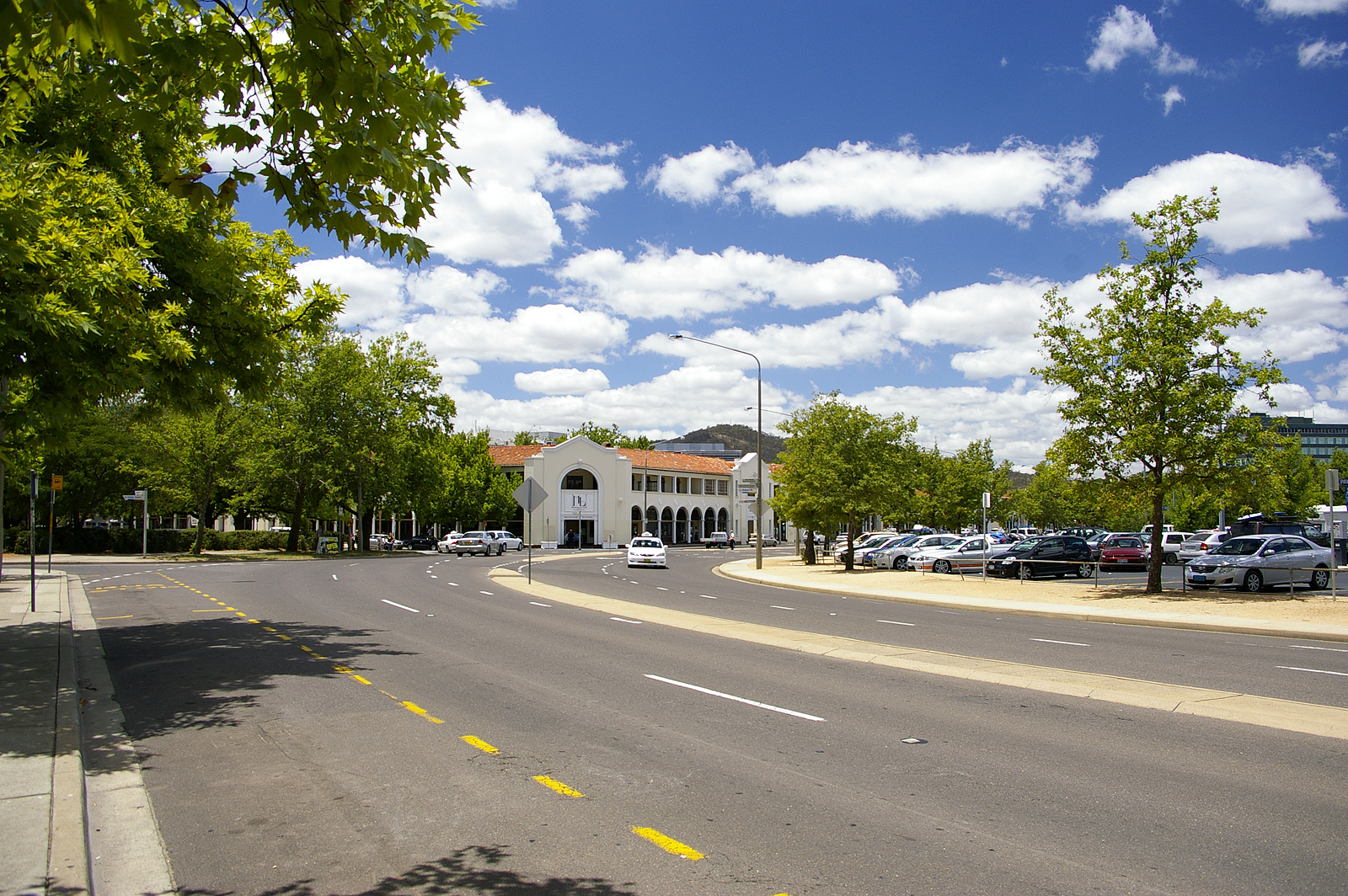
- Looking northeast on London Circuit

General information
- Type: Road
- Location: Canberra
- Length: 1.86 km (1.2 mi)
- Opened: 1930s
- Former route number: ACT Tourist Drive 1; (Constitution Avenue–Northbourne Avenue) [Anti-clockwise]; ACT Tourist Drive 7; (Edinburgh Avenue–Commonwealth Avenue) [Clockwise]
- Ring road around: City Hill
- Northbourne Avenue; Constitution Avenue; Commonwealth Avenue; Edinburgh Avenue

Location(s)
- Major suburbs: Civic

London Circuit is a road in Canberra, Australia, which surrounds City Hill in Civic, the city centre. It has a hexagonal shape, and intersects with several main roads such as Northbourne Avenue (35.28°S 149.129°E), Edinburgh Avenue (35.283°S 149.126°E), Akuna Street (35.282°S 149.132°E), Constitution Avenue and Commonwealth Avenue (35.284°S 149.128°E).

Several important buildings are located on London Circuit. These include the Australian Capital Territory Legislative Assembly, the Supreme Court, the ACT Magistrates Court, the historic Sydney and Melbourne Buildings, the Canberra Theatre and the QT Canberra.

Work commenced in 2022 to raise part of London Circuit by 6 m (20 ft) and provide a signalised, level intersection with Commonwealth Avenue. This intersection was previously grade-separated featuring cloverleaf ramps, requiring the demolition of the 1963 built overpass to be replaced by new roadway built on top of 60,000 m^{3} of fill material. The Government of the Australian Capital Territory said this will create a more "people oriented" space, improving access for pedestrians and cyclists as well as public transport infrastructure, however warned of traffic disruption over a four year period during construction. Raising London Circuit was completed in September 2025 and is a key piece of enabling works for stage 2 of Canberra light rail, and will also allow the release of former transport-related land for mixed-use renewal precincts.

Light rail stage 2A is being built along the western portion of London Circuit from Northbourne Avenue to Commonwealth Avenue, with stations to serve City West and the Australian National University, a new City South and Commonwealth Park.

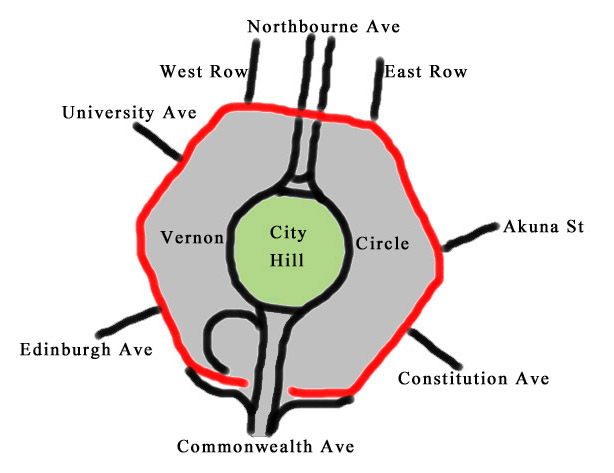
Diagram showing the relative positions of London Circuit (in red) and the other roads regarding City Hill

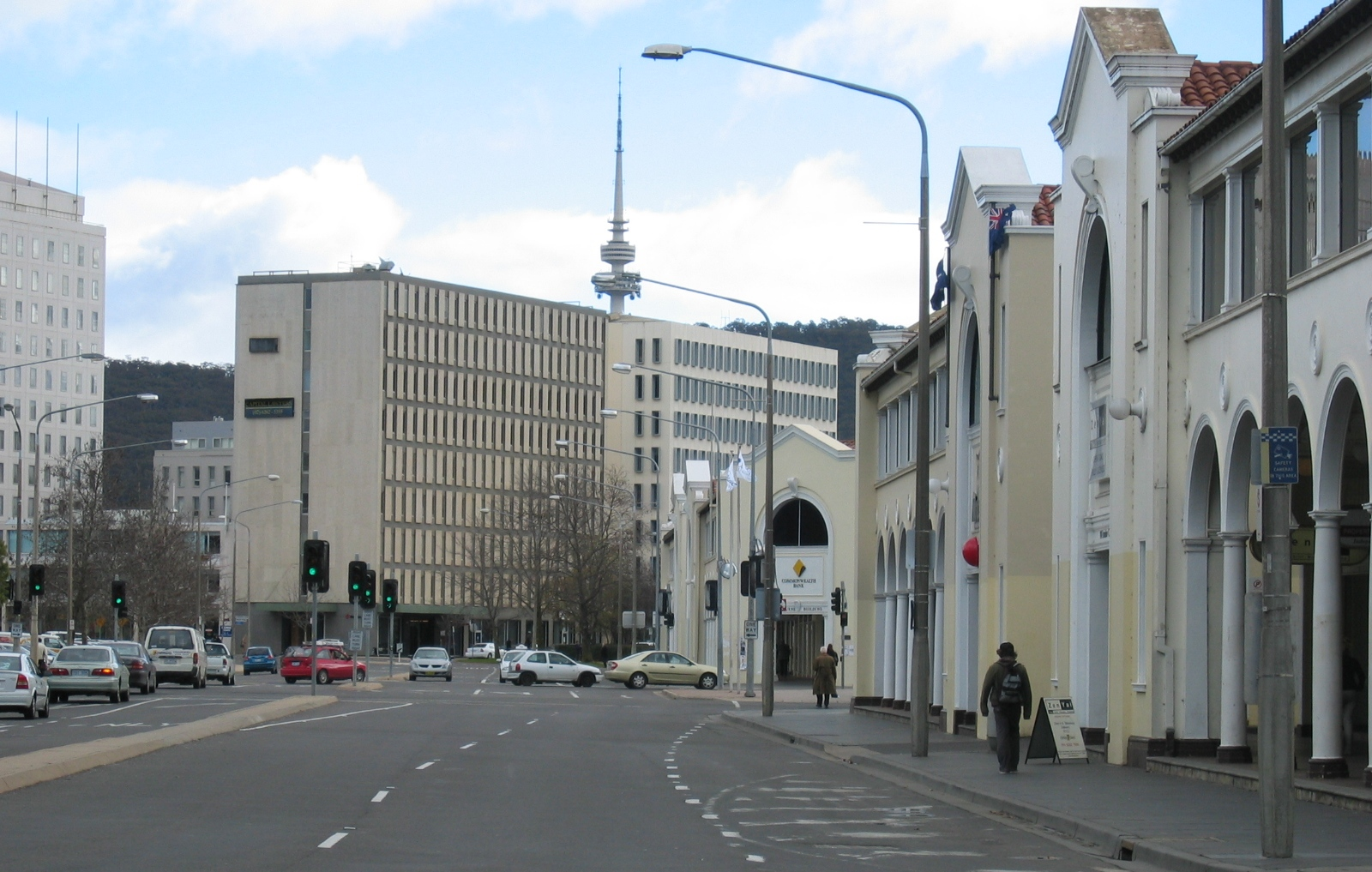
London Circuit looking west towards Black Mountain with the Sydney and Melbourne Buildings on the right, office buildings in the distance, and Telstra Tower visible on Black Mountain
