= Constitution Avenue, Canberra =

Road in Canberra, Australia

Constitution Avenue Australian Capital Territory
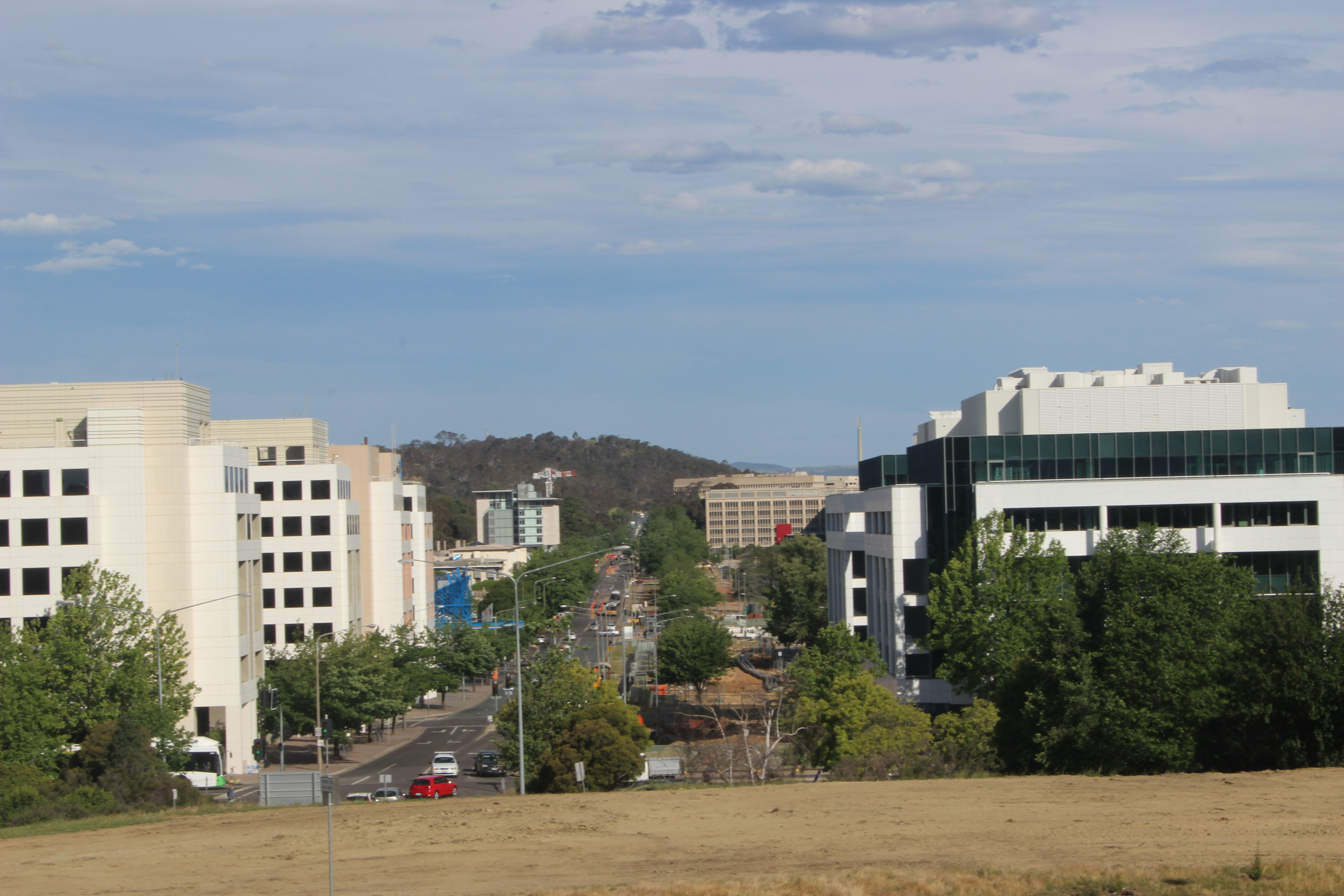
- Looking from west to east along Constitution Avenue from City Hill

General information
- Type: Road
- Length: 2.6 km (1.6 mi)
- Former route number: ACT Tourist Route 1 (Civic–Russell); ACT Tourist Route 3 (Campbell–Russell)

Major junctions
- Northwest end: Vernon Circle; Civic, Australian Capital Territory
- London Circuit; Coranderrk Street; Anzac Parade; Reg Saunders Way
- Southeast end: Northcott Drive; Campbell, Australian Capital Territory

Location(s)
- Major suburbs: Campbell, Russell, Reid

Constitution Avenue in a street in Canberra, the capital of Australia.

It forms the municipal axis of Walter Burley Griffin's geometric design for the city, originally envisioned as a commerce focussed main street. The avenue lies on the northern side of Lake Burley Griffin and is one of the three sides that make up the boundary of the Parliamentary Triangle.

Prominent structures and institutions located along Constitution Avenue include the National Convention Centre Canberra, University of New South Wales' Canberra City precinct, St John's, the Ben Chifley building (headquarters of the Australian Security Intelligence Organisation) and Russell Offices.

In 2019, glass artist Matthew Curtis completed Field of Light, a 7 m (23 ft) by 2.4 m (7 ft 10 in) sculpture consisting of 2000 glass lenses with LED backlighting. The sculpture marks the original location of the Headquarters of the Returned and Services League of Australia, now the Iskia Apartments at 81 Constitution Avenue.

Towards the western terminus of the avenue at Constitution Place is a sculpture constructed by April Pine entitled Windswept. It depicts Andrew Inglis Clark who is noted for his political contributions to the early Commonwealth.
