= Saarru =

Canadian island

- Location within Nunavut Location within Canada

Geography
- Location: Hudson Strait
- Coordinates: 64°19′N 075°36′W
- Archipelago: Arctic Archipelago

Administration
- Canada
- Territory: Nunavut
- Region: Qikiqtaaluk

Demographics
- Population: Uninhabited

Saarru (Inuktitut syllabics ᓵᕐᕈ) formerly Alareak Island is an uninhabited island in the Qikiqtaaluk Region of Nunavut, Canada. It is a Baffin Island offshore island in Hudson Strait on the southwest side of Andrew Gordon Bay. It is situated at approximately 1 metre (3 feet 3 inches) above sea level.

Kinngait, previously Cape Dorset, an Inuit hamlet on Dorset Island, is approximately 33 kilometres (21 miles) to the west-southwest.
