= Russellville =

Russellville is the name of several communities in the United States:

- Russellville, Alabama
- Russellville, Arkansas
- Russellville, Georgia
- Russellville, Illinois
- Russellville, Boone County, Illinois
- Russellville, Indiana
- Russellville, Kentucky
- Russellville, Missouri
- Russellville, Ray County, Missouri
- Russellville, Ohio
- Russellville, Pennsylvania
- Russellville, South Carolina
- Russellville, Tennessee
- Russellville, West Virginia
