= Vernon Circle =

Road in Canberra, Australia

Vernon Circle Australian Capital Territory
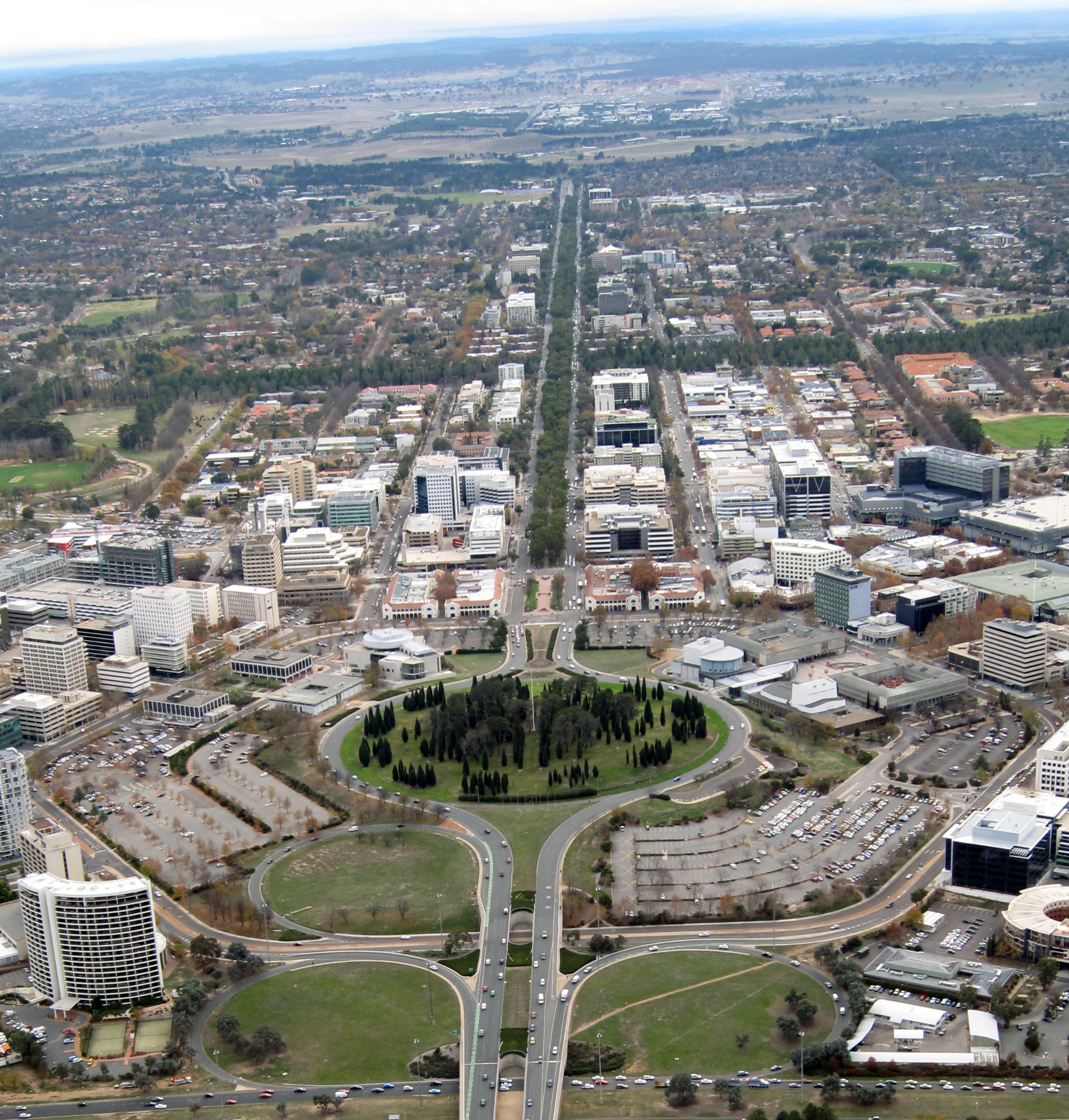
- Aerial view looking north over Vernon Circle
- Coordinates: 35.280988°S 149.128833°E

General information
- Type: Highway
- Length: 750 m (0.5 mi)
- Route number(s): A23 (2013–present)
- Former route number: National Route 23 (1955–2013); ACT Tourist Drive 1; ACT Tourist Drive 2; ACT Tourist Drive 7

Major junctions
- South end: Commonwealth Avenue; Civic, Australian Capital Territory
- Edinburgh Avenue; Constitution Avenue
- North end: Northbourne Avenue; Civic, Australian Capital Territory

Location(s)
- Major suburbs: Civic

Highway system
- Highways in Australia; National Highway • Freeways in Australia; Road infrastructure in Canberra

Vernon Circle is a road in Canberra, Australia that encircles City Hill.

It was named after Walter Liberty Vernon.
