= ACT Heritage Library =

Library in Canberra, Australian Capital Territory

Coordinates: 35.331630°S 149.165449°E

Logo for the ACT Heritage Library

The ACT Heritage Library is the state library of the Australian Capital Territory (ACT). It is the heritage section of the ACT Library and Information Services. Antoinette Buchanan has been the Manager of the ACT Heritage Library since 2004.

The ACT Heritage Library collects, manages and provides access to material relevant to the ACT's documentary heritage. It offers assistance in researching matters relating to the ACT, its history and its development.

== Collections ==
The collection of books and journals in the ACT Heritage Library focuses on the works published in the ACT, by ACT residents, or about the ACT. Special collections include the collection and a small magazine collection.

The ACT Heritage Library has a collection of local and regional newspapers in microfilm and print, including newspapers from culturally and linguistically diverse communities and a complete run of Canberra Times from the 1920s.

The ACT Heritage Library holds 4,000 maps and plans of Canberra and the ACT and plans of some public and private buildings.

Sketch map showing proposed federal territory, and capital site at Queanbeyan in Royal Commission on Sites for the Seat of Government of the Commonwealth (Sydney: Government Printer, 1903), ACT Heritage Library

The collection of approximately 200 archives and manuscripts collections in the ACT Heritage Library focuses on local groups and individuals who have made notable contributions to the ACT community. Strengths include early childhood education and performing arts.

The ACT Heritage Library has an extensive ephemera collection of around 300 archive boxes and 2,000 posters, with a particular strength in the performing arts.

=== Photographs ===
The ACT Heritage Library has three significant collections of images:

- Photographs from the Canberra Times and the Canberra Chronicle from the 1970s to the 1990s;
- Photographs from the Commonwealth Department of Capital Territory from the 1950s through to the early 1980s; and
- The David Coward Photography Collection, a collection of over 300,000 negatives, the work of commercial photographer, David Coward who operated in Canberra, 1958–2003.

Materials from the collections are being digitised and catalogued in the online database, Images ACT, which currently includes over 8,000 digitised photographs of the ACT and region from the ACT Heritage Library. Additional ACT photographs held in national and state institutions, as well those from Images ACT, can be found in the National Library of Australia's digitised collection, Trove.

== Exhibitions ==
The ACT Heritage Library regularly presents small exhibitions and display in their reading room, with additional exhibitions held in the Civic Library building.

Some items from the ACT Heritage Library were featured in the touring exhibition National Treasures from Australia's Great Libraries, which toured every Australian state capital from 3 December 2005 to late 2007.

Reflections of Canberra is an online exhibition, sampling the collection of the ACT Heritage Library and reflecting the changing landscape lifestyles of the Canberra region and its community.

== Collaborative services and projects ==
The National Library of Australia and the ACT Heritage Library work cooperatively to ensure the preservation of newspaper titles published in the ACT under the Australian Newspaper Plan.

The ACT Heritage Library contributes its digitised images from Images ACT to Trove.
