= Russell Island (Frankland Islands) =

Island in Australia

- Interactive map of Russell Island

Geography
- Location: Northern Australia
- Coordinates: 17.228°S 146.094°E

Administration
- Australia
- State: Queensland

Russell Island in North Queensland is part of the Frankland Islands which form Frankland Group National Park, 30 km north-east of Babinda, and south-east of Cairns. A Queensland Parks and Wildlife Service campsite exists on the flat end of the island overlooking a beach; the other end of the island is steep with heavy jungle. Pythons are known to inhabit the island.

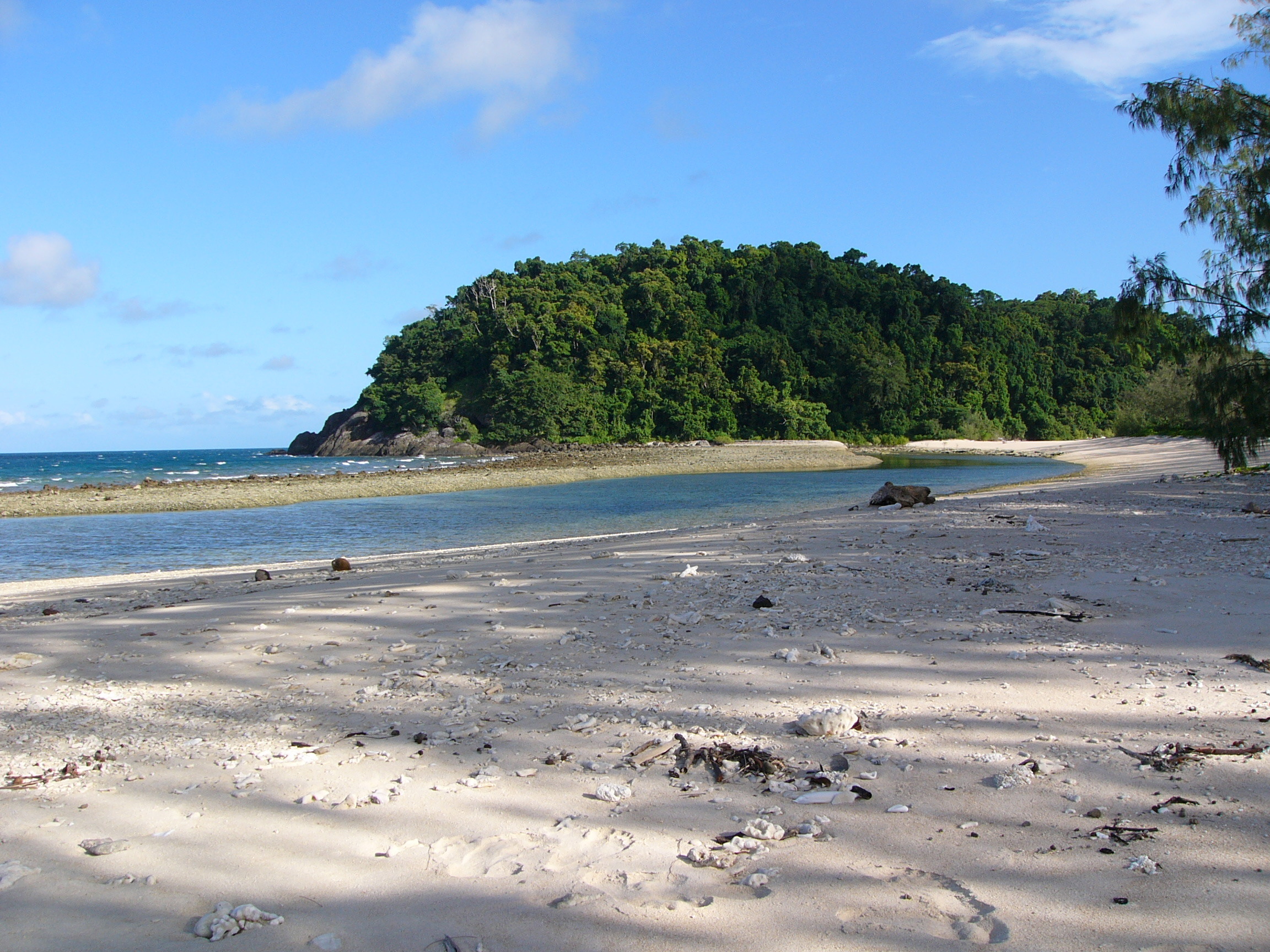
View from Russell Island

The Frankland Islands are teeming with permanent & migratory marine life, especially the green sea turtle which nests on the island. Normanby Island, part of the Frankland Islands group offers a comprehensive reef system with a tropical island.

The islands are very popular with reef tour operators working from Cairns.
