= Barry Drive, Canberra =

Road in Canberra, Australia

Barry Drive Australian Capital Territory

General information
- Type: Road
- Length: 3.2 km (2.0 mi)
- Former route number: ACT Tourist Route 2 (through Turner); ACT Tourist Route 7 (through Turner)

Major junctions
- East end: Northbourne Avenue; Turner, Australian Capital Territory
- McCaughey Street; Clunies Ross Street; Fairfax Street
- West end: Belconnen Way; O'Connor, Australian Capital Territory

Barry Drive is a major arterial road in Canberra, the capital city of Australia. The road forms part of the most direct route between the city centre, Belconnen Town Centre and Calvary Hospital, as well as providing access to the Australian National University and laboratories of the Commonwealth Scientific and Industrial Research Organisation. Barry Drive defines the boundary between the suburbs of Acton and Turner. It was named after Sir Redmond Barry, an Irish-born Victorian judge and inaugural Chancellor of the University of Melbourne.

The road skirts the foot of Black Mountain and joins Belconnen Way in the Canberra Nature Park. Barry Drive, along with Belconnen Way was constructed between 1965 and 1971 as a single carriageway road. It was progressively upgraded to a dual carriageway as traffic volumes grew. As a major transport corridor, many ACTION bus routes transit Barry Drive including cross-city route R4.

The Belconnen Transitway, a proposal to upgrade the existing bus corridor between Belconnen and Canberra City, will partly run along Barry Drive. The transitway is designed to improve access, reduce travel times and congestion, and increase productivity.
