= City Hill, Canberra =

Park in Canberra, Australia

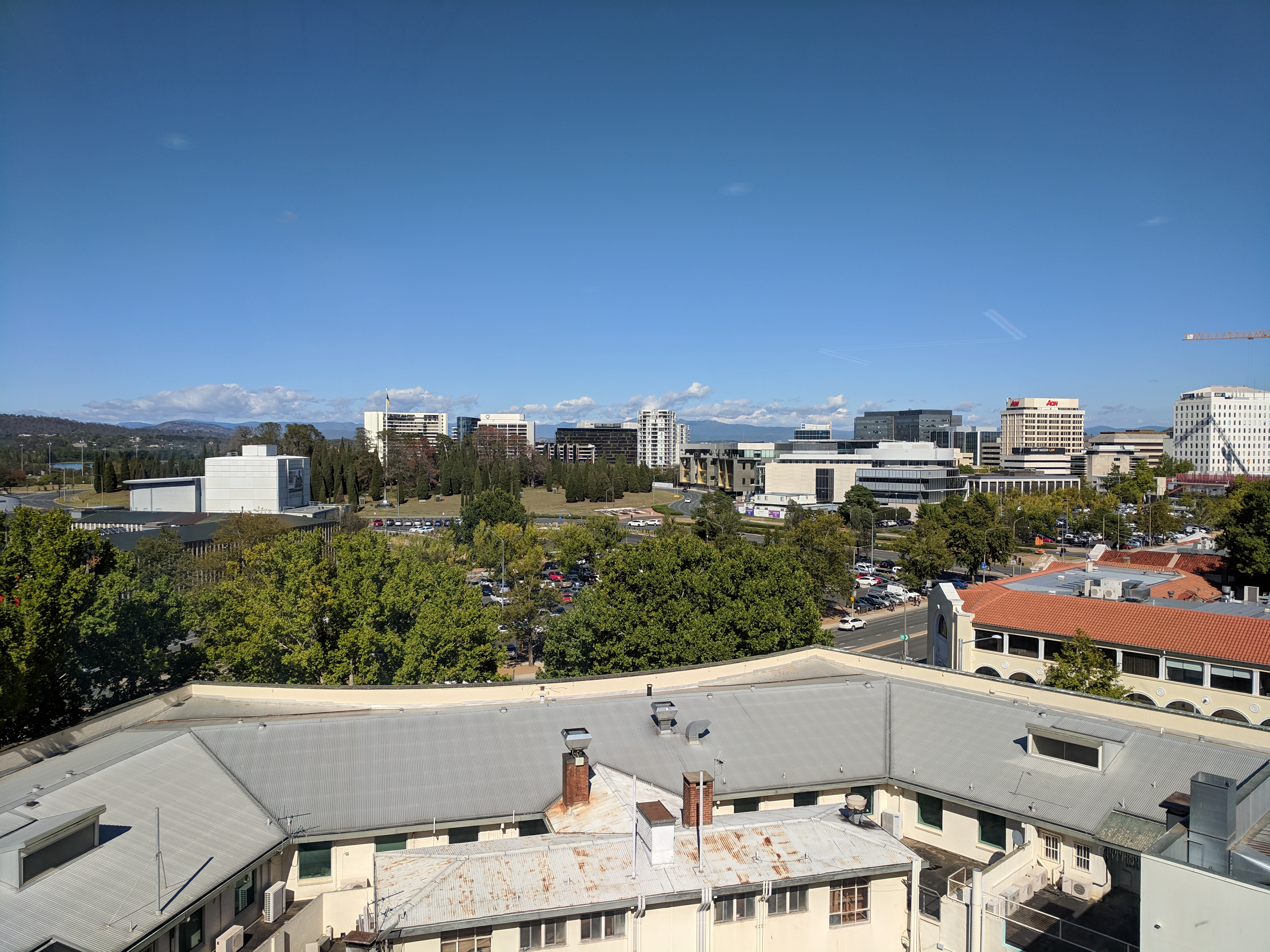
- View of City Hill and the south-western part of Civic, 2019
- Interactive map of City Hill, Canberra
- Location: Civic, Australian Capital Territory
- Coordinates: 35°16′55″S 149°7′43″E

City Hill is a park located in Canberra, Australia, on one of the points of the Parliamentary Triangle, a feature of Walter Burley Griffin's plan for the city. The park is surrounded by Vernon Circle, at the south end of Northbourne Avenue, but beyond Vernon Circle it is further surrounded by the concentric London Circuit, and the area between Vernon Circle and London Circuit (which is partly built up) can also be seen as part of the hill. City Hill is an integral part of the city centre design. To the south of the hill Northbourne Avenue becomes Commonwealth Avenue, and further along is Commonwealth Avenue bridge.

== History and design ==
City Hill was conceived by the American architect Walter Burley Griffin at the time of the announcement of the 1911 competition for the design of Canberra. Griffin's plan, which would later be chosen in 1912, focused on bold geometric axial arrangement of its main avenues "to coordinate with the surrounding topography of the site and to integrate the city within its natural setting". This overriding symmetry was personified by the ‘National Triangle’ (Parliamentary Triangle), composed of three broad avenues meeting in vertices with its base. The western corner of this central triangle, the City Hill properly, "was intended [by Griffin] to function as a ‘municipal hub’, providing a heart for the city independent from the Federal Government structures on the other side of the lake" with six important avenues radiating from it, two of which being sides of the Triangle: the Commonwealth and Constitution Avenues.

The hill was planted in 1921. The design, supervised by Charles Weston, Canberra's first Superintendent of Parks and Gardens, was to emphasise the vistas along the six avenues radiating from the hill and reinforce the focus that Griffin placed on the hill as forming part of the Parliamentary Triangle. At the centre of the hill is a flagpole flying the ACT flag since 1989 when the territory became self-governing. Immediately surrounding the flagpole are double staggered rows of closely spaced Roman cypresses. Radiating outwards are twelve oval shaped groups of Roman cypresses and six groups of Torrey pines (planted in the same formation as the original plantings of Monterey pines, replaced in 2019) reinforcing the symmetrical nature of the design. In 2014, the Canberra Centenary Column was added to the park, to commemorate Canberra's centenary.

== Location ==
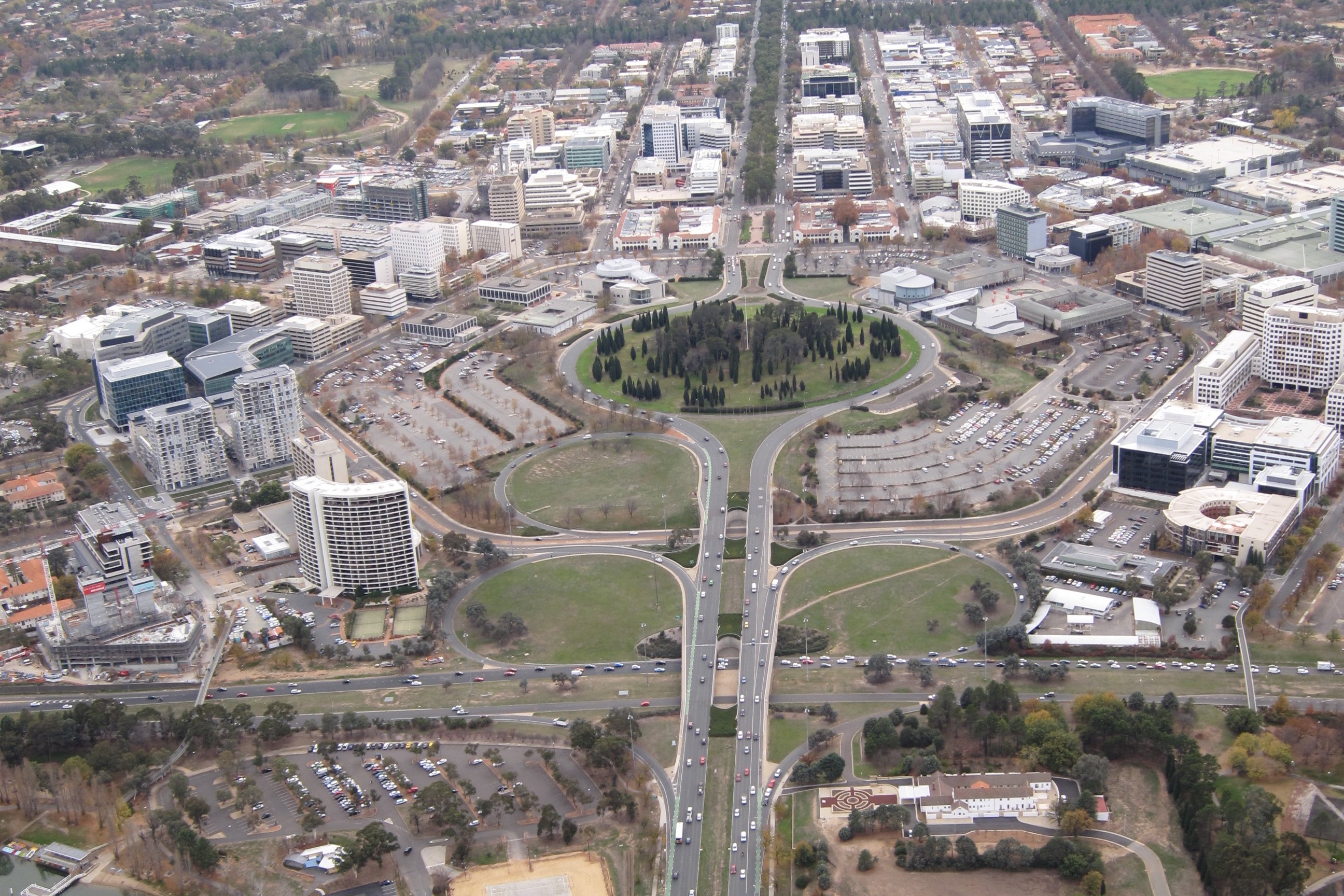
Aerial view of City Hill and the Vernon Circle and London Circuit concentric roads surrounding it, 2009

The park is centrally located and well-known, but it is underutilised as it is away from shops and public areas and is difficult to access because it is surrounded by a major road. The prominent flagpole at the centre of Vernon Circle is not actually at the highest point of City Hill. The highest point of City Hill is to the south east, overlooking Lake Burley Griffin. Unusually for the centre of a large city and as a result of the relative isolation of City Hill, a small variety of mushrooms can be found growing under the pine trees. The City Hill area also has a large population of rabbits.
