= Russell, Australian Capital Territory =

Suburb of Canberra, Australia

Russell
- Suburb
- Russell as viewed from Northcott Drive, to its immediate east c. 2009

- Coordinates: 35°17′49″S 149°09′01″E
- Country: Australia
- State: Australian Capital Territory
- District: North Canberra
- Location: 4 km (2.5 mi) SE of Canberra CBD; 13 km (8.1 mi) WSW of Queanbeyan; 93 km (58 mi) SW of Goulburn; 290 km (180 mi) SW of Sydney

Government
  - Territory electorate: Kurrajong
  - Federal division: Canberra
- Elevation: 580 m (1,900 ft)

Population
  - Total: 0 (SAL 2016)
- Postcode: 2600
Suburbs around Russell
Parkes	Campbell	Campbell
Parkes	Russell	Mount Pleasant
Barton	Lake Burley Griffin	Fyshwick

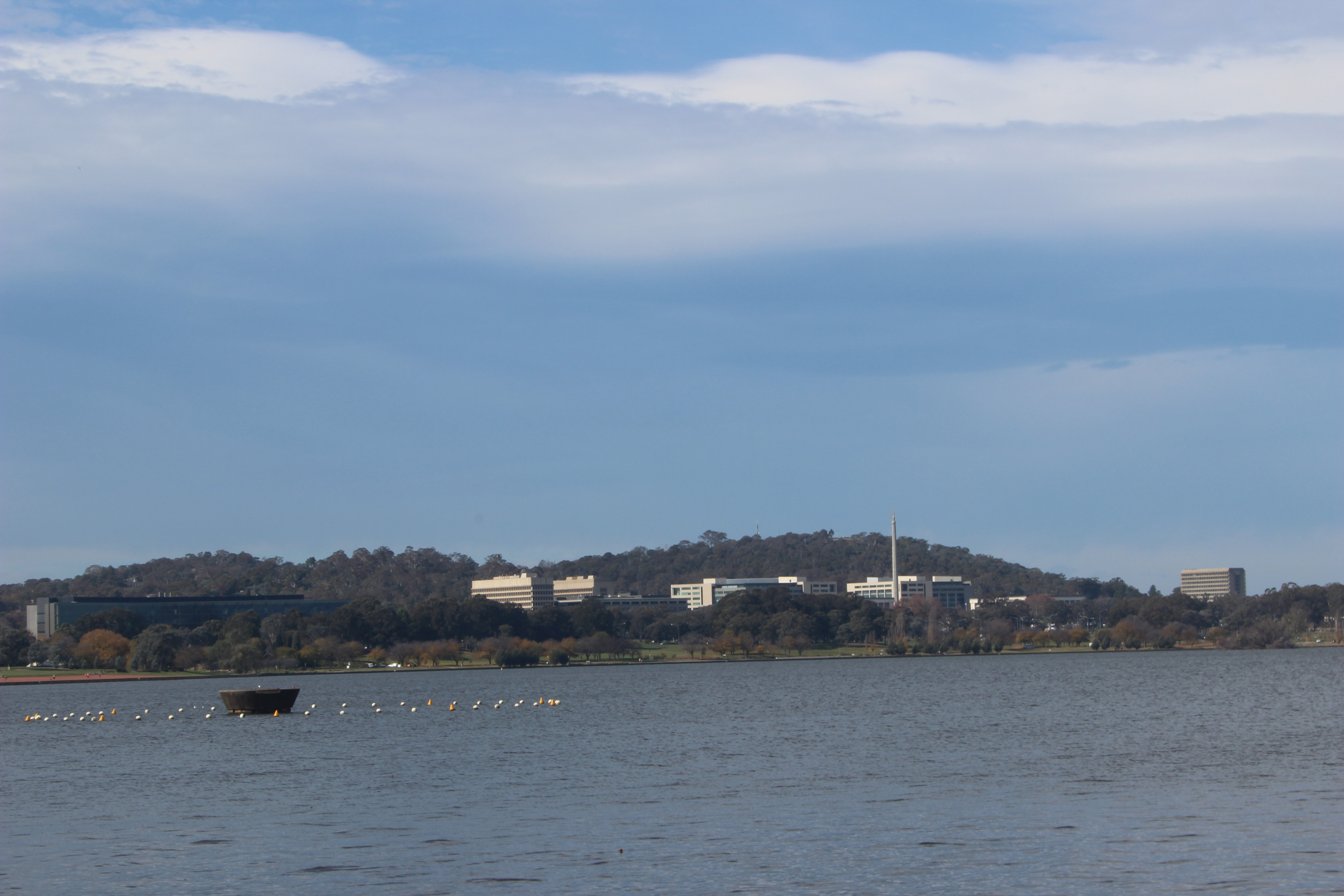
Russell, Canberra from Regatta Point, looking across Lake Burley Griffin

Russell is a suburb of Canberra, Australia in the North Canberra district. Russell is one of the smallest suburbs in Canberra, comprising a number of government offices but with no private residences. It is probably best known for the headquarters of the Australian Defence Force, which is housed in the Russell Offices complex.

Russell is bounded by Morshead Drive, Parkes Way and Constitution Avenue. Mount Pleasant lies just to the east, between Russell and Duntroon (which is part of the suburb of Campbell). The Australian American War Memorial is located in Russell. To the west lie Kings Park and Grevillea Park, on the shore of Lake Burley Griffin.

The suburb name has been associated with the locality for many years; the surveyor Charles Scrivener gave the name 'Russell' to an adjacent trigonometrical station in about 1910 and later adopted the name for an early settlement in the locality. The streets in Russell are named after armed services personnel.

== Geology ==
Most of Russell is dominated by the lowest layer of the Ainslie Volcanics, a grey dacite and other erupted particles such as agglomerate and tuff. Tertiary age pebbly gravels are around Parkes Way left from when the Molonglo River was at a higher level.
