= State Circle =

Road in Canberra, Australia

State Circle Australian Capital Territory
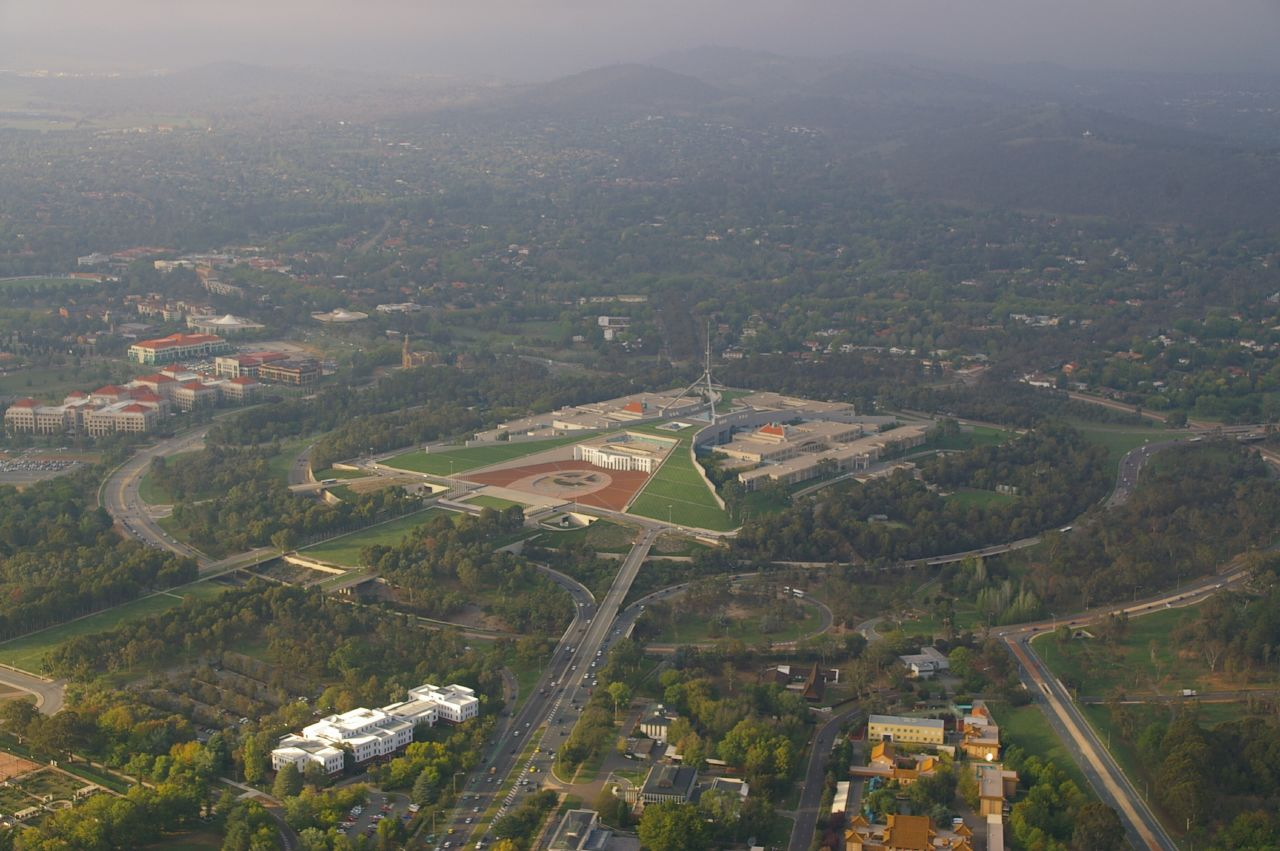
- State Circle is the outer of two circular concentric roads that orbit Parliament House.

General information
- Type: Road
- Location: Canberra
- Length: 3 km (1.9 mi)
- Route number(s): A23 (2013–present) (Canberra Avenue to Commonwealth Avenue, anti-clockwise, northbound only)
- Former route number: National Route 23 (1955–2013); ACT Tourist Drive 1 (through Parkes); ACT Tourist Drive 5 (Yarralumla–Forrest); ACT Tourist Drive 6 (Parkes–Barton)
- Ring road around: Capital Hill

Major junctions
- From: Commonwealth Avenue; Capital Hill, Australian Capital Territory
- Kings Avenue; Canberra Avenue; Melbourne Avenue; Adelaide Avenue; Flynn Drive
- To: Commonwealth Avenue; Capital Hill, Australian Capital Territory

Location(s)
- Major suburbs: Parkes, Barton, Forrest, Deakin, Yarralumla

State Circle is a circular road surrounding Capital Hill in the centre of Canberra, Australia's capital city. It is the outermost of the three concentric roads on the hill, with Capital Circle and Parliament Drive located within State Circle. State Circle is a bi-directional four-lane road with most intersections being signalised and at-grade. The speed limit is 70 km/h.

It is named for the states of Australia. Roads named for each of Australia's state capitals are also among those that intersect or terminate at State Circle. The main roads leading from the circle are Commonwealth Avenue, Kings Avenue, Adelaide Avenue, and Canberra Avenue.

State Circle featured prominently on Walter Burley Griffin's plans for Canberra. It was originally envisaged there would be a number of circular concentric roads around Capital Hill. Only Capital Circle and State Circle were ever fully completed. It is considered a main avenue, and a road of national significance, by the National Capital Authority.

== Intersections & Interchanges ==
As State Circle is a circular road, the table below lists all intersections and interchanges starting at Commonwealth Avenue interchange and proceeding clockwise.

District	Location	km	mi	Destinations	Notes
Canberra Central	Capital Hill, Yarralumla, Parkes	0.00	0.00	Commonwealth Avenue – City, Parkes	Partial trumpet interchange, northbound anticlockwise exit, and southbound clockwise entry only.
Canberra Central	Capital Hill, Parkes	0.01	0.0062	Capital Circle overpass (southbound)	
Canberra Central	Capital Hill, Parkes	0.19	0.12	Federation Mall overpass (northbound)	
Canberra Central	Capital Hill, Parkes	0.28	0.17	Federation Mall overpass (southbound)	
Canberra Central	Capital Hill, Parkes, Barton	0.50	0.31	Kings Avenue – Parkes, Barton, Parliament House	Signal-controlled crossroads
Canberra Central	Capital Hill, Barton	0.75	0.47	Brisbane Avenue – Barton	Signal-controlled crossroads
Canberra Central	Capital Hill, Barton, Forrest	1.00	0.62	Sydney Avenue – Barton, Forrest	Signal-controlled T-intersection
Canberra Central	Capital Hill, Forrest	1.25	0.78	Canberra Avenue – Queanbeyan, Cooma, Forrest	Signal-controlled crossroads
Canberra Central	Capital Hill, Forrest	1.40	0.87	Hobart Avenue – Forrest	Signal-controlled T-intersection
Canberra Central	Capital Hill, Forrest, Deakin	1.70	1.06	Melbourne Avenue – Forrest, Deakin, Red Hill Lookout, Federal Golf Course, Parliament House	Signal-controlled T-intersection
Canberra Central	Capital Hill, Deakin, Yarralumla	2.00	1.24	Adelaide Avenue – Woden, Tuggeranong, Deakin, Yarralumla	Modified trumpet interchange, exit and entry ramps in place for both clockwise and anticlockwise lanes, but only for traffic heading to/from the west.
Canberra Central	Capital Hill, Yarralumla	2.25	1.40	Perth Avenue – Yarralumla	Uncontrolled T-intersection
Canberra Central	Capital Hill, Yarralumla	2.50	1.55	Rhodes Place – (No through road)	Uncontrolled T-intersection
Canberra Central	Capital Hill, Yarralumla	2.75	1.71	Flynn Drive – City, Yarralumla, Parkes, Lennox Gardens	Uncontrolled T-intersection
Canberra Central	Capital Hill, Yarralumla	2.99	1.86	Capital Circle overpass (northbound)	
Canberra Central	Capital Hill, Yarralumla, Parkes	3.00	1.86	Clockwise loop completed, refer back to top of table	
1.000 mi = 1.609 km; 1.000 km = 0.621 mi: Incomplete access
