= Kings Avenue, Canberra =

Road in Canberra, Australia

Kings Avenue Australian Capital Territory
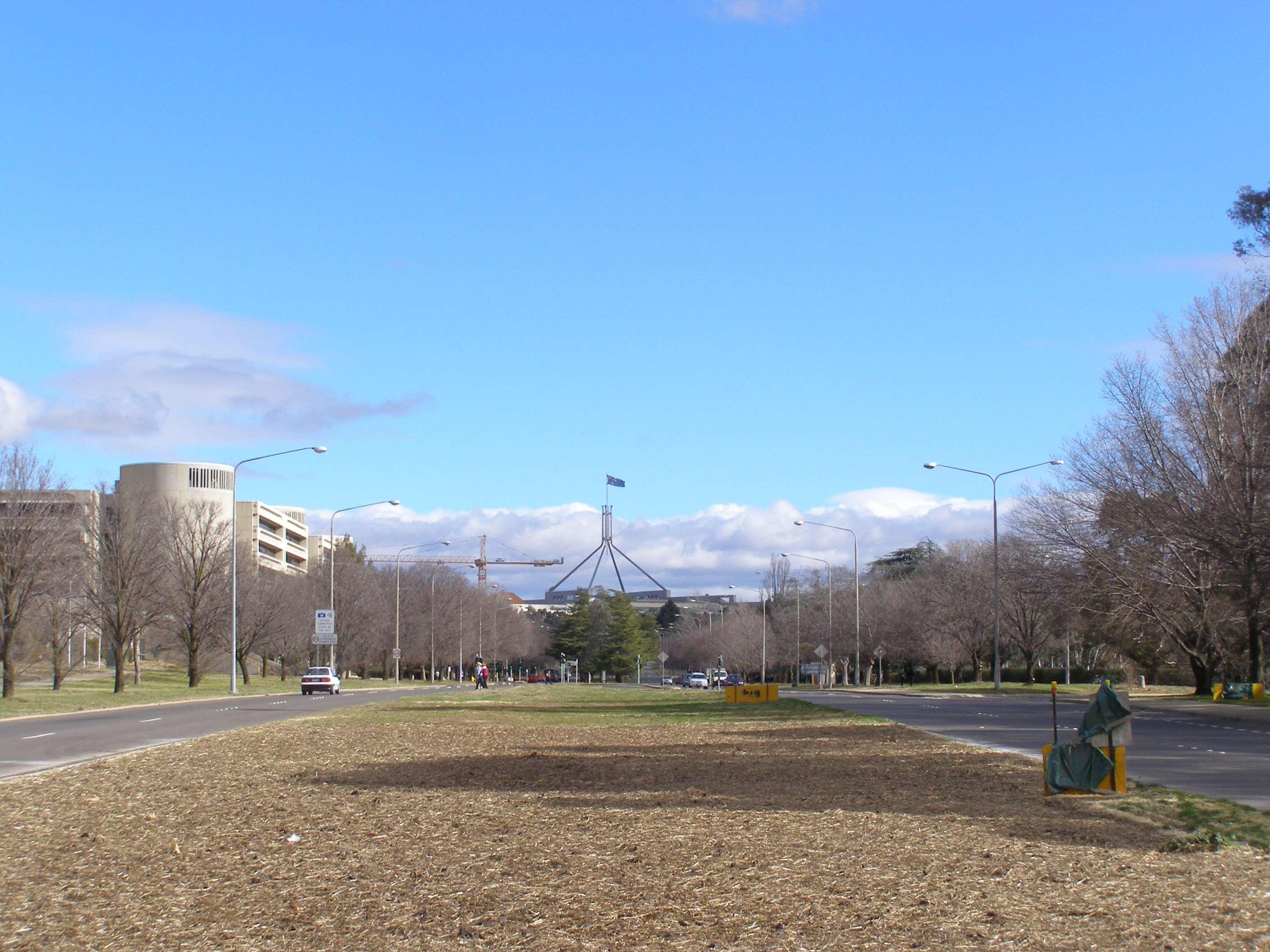
- Kings Avenue looking towards Parliament House

General information
- Type: Road
- Length: 2.4 km (1.5 mi)
- Former route number: ACT Tourist Route 1 (Russell–Capital Hill)

Major junctions
- Northeast end: Sir Thomas Blamey Square; Russell, Australian Capital Territory
- Russell Drive; Parkes Way; Morshead Drive; Bowen Drive; State Circle (northbound); Capital Circle (southbound)
- Southwest end: Parliament Drive; Capital Hill, Australian Capital Territory

Location(s)
- Major suburbs: Russell, Parkes, Barton

Kings Avenue is a road in Canberra which goes between New Parliament House (35.307°S 149.127°E), across Lake Burley Griffin at the Kings Avenue Bridge (35.302°S 149.141°E), to Russell near the Australian-American Monument. (35.298°S 149.151°E).

== Route ==
It begins at State Circle around Capital Hill and forms the border between the suburbs of Parkes and Barton. It passes the National Archives of Australia, Robert Garran offices, Edmund Barton Building, Australian Centre for Christianity and Culture, Bowen Place and Kings Park. It ends at the intersection with Russell Drive.

Significant roads off it include: National Circuit; King George Terrace and King Edward Terrace within the Parliamentary Triangle; and, to the north of the Lake, Parkes Way, the major thoroughfare from the Canberra airport to the city.

The road was originally named Federal Avenue by the architect of Canberra, Walter Burley Griffin It was ultimately named after the Sovereign at the time of the founding of Canberra, King George V, who also, as Duke of York opened the first Parliament of Australia in 1901. Principal roads in Canberra are laid out in a geometrical pattern when viewed on a map. One of the predominant features forming this geometry is Capital Hill with major roads (Avenues) emanating radially from it. Two of these roads form the Parliamentary Triangle incorporating bridges crossing Lake Burley Griffin.

The speed limit on Kings Avenue is 60 km/h from the State Circle end to the southwestern side of Kings Avenue Bridge. The speed limit over the bridge and up to the Parkes Way overpass is 70 km/h.

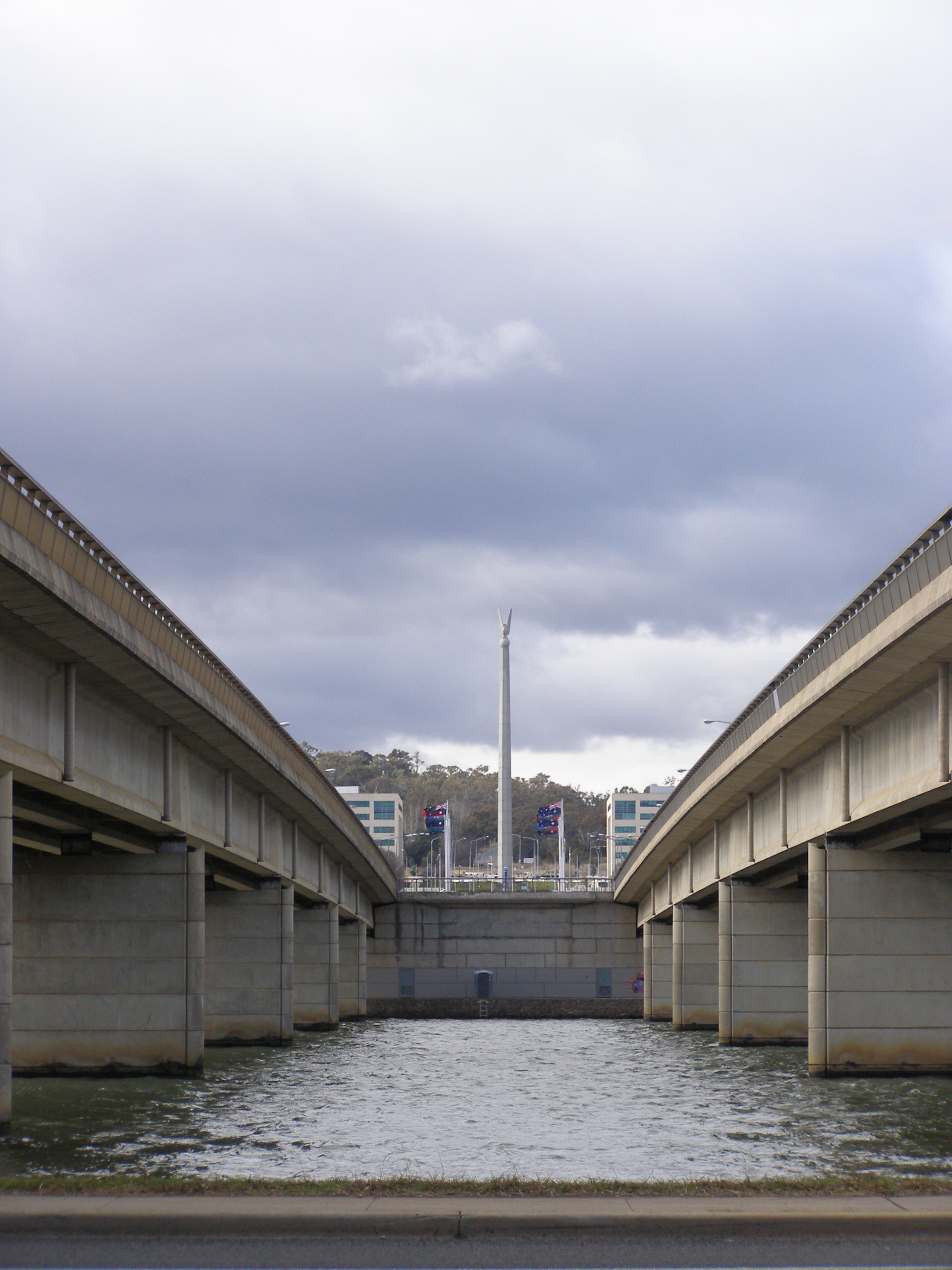
Kings Avenue Bridge looking towards Russell Offices and the Australian American War Memorial

The avenue is a property on the Australian edition of board game Monopoly (game)

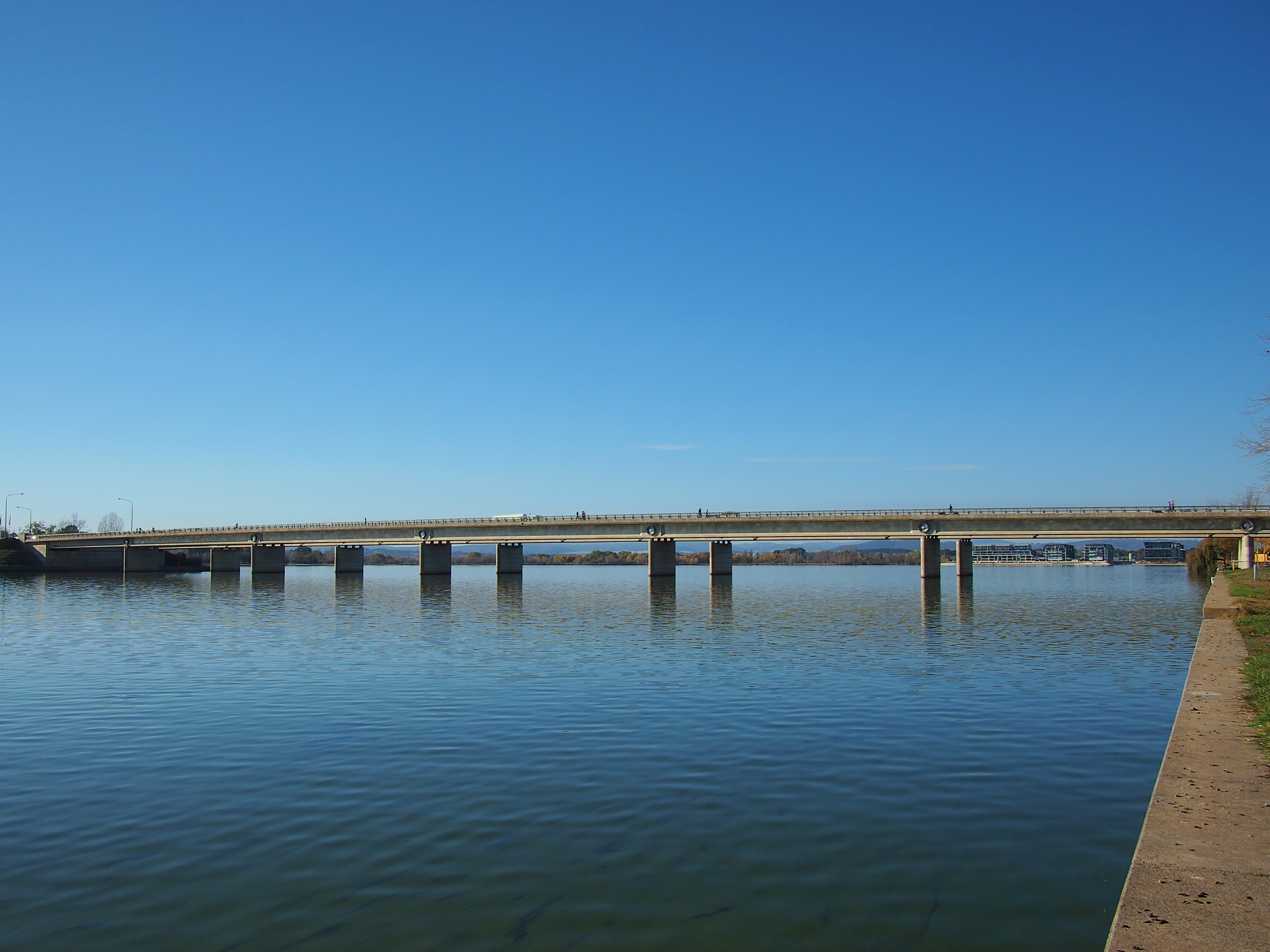
Kings Avenue Bridge across Lake Burley Griffin

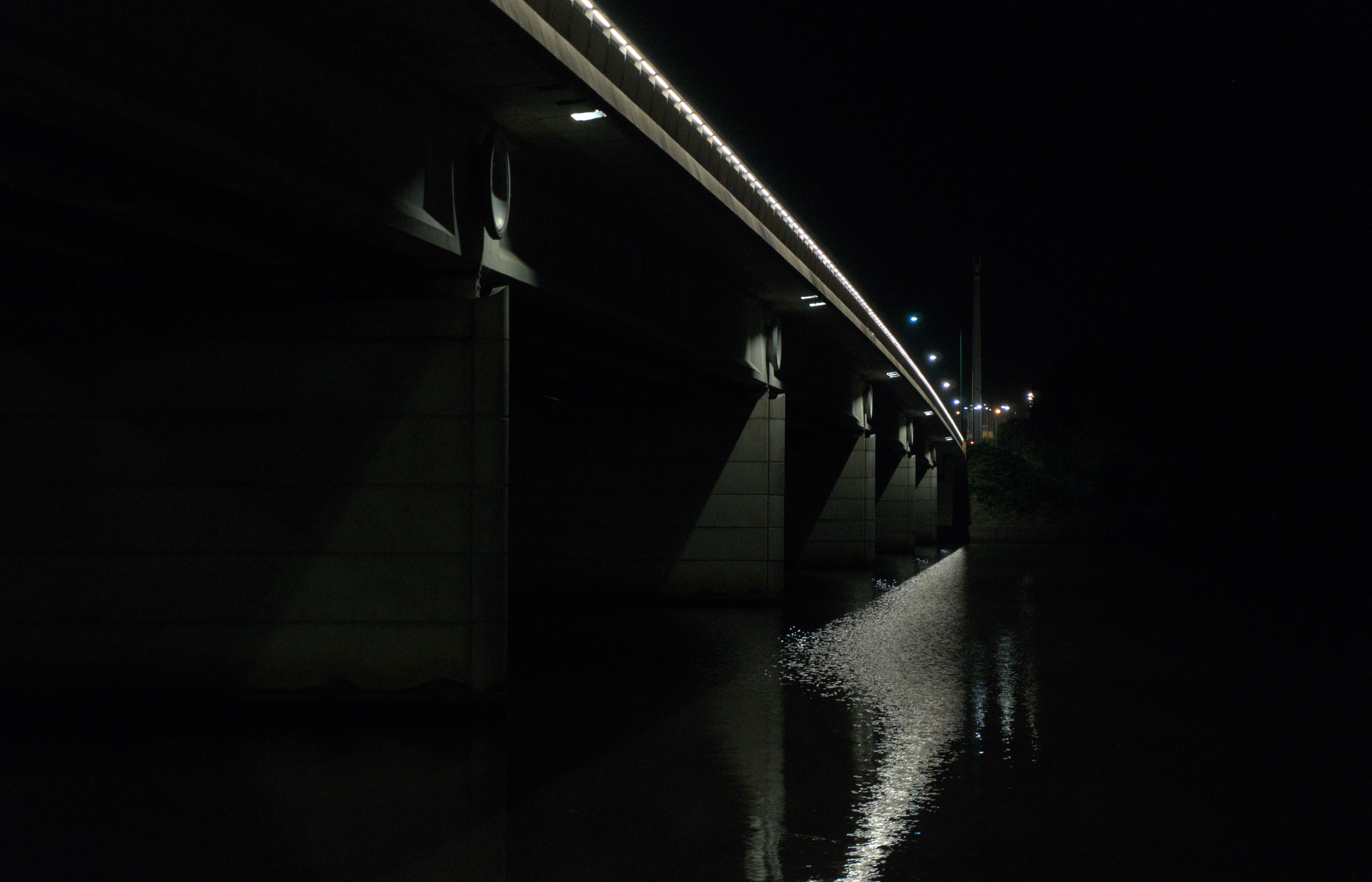
Kings Avenue bridge at night, 1 of 2
