= Commonwealth Avenue (Canberra) =

Road in Canberra, Australia

Commonwealth Avenue Australian Capital Territory
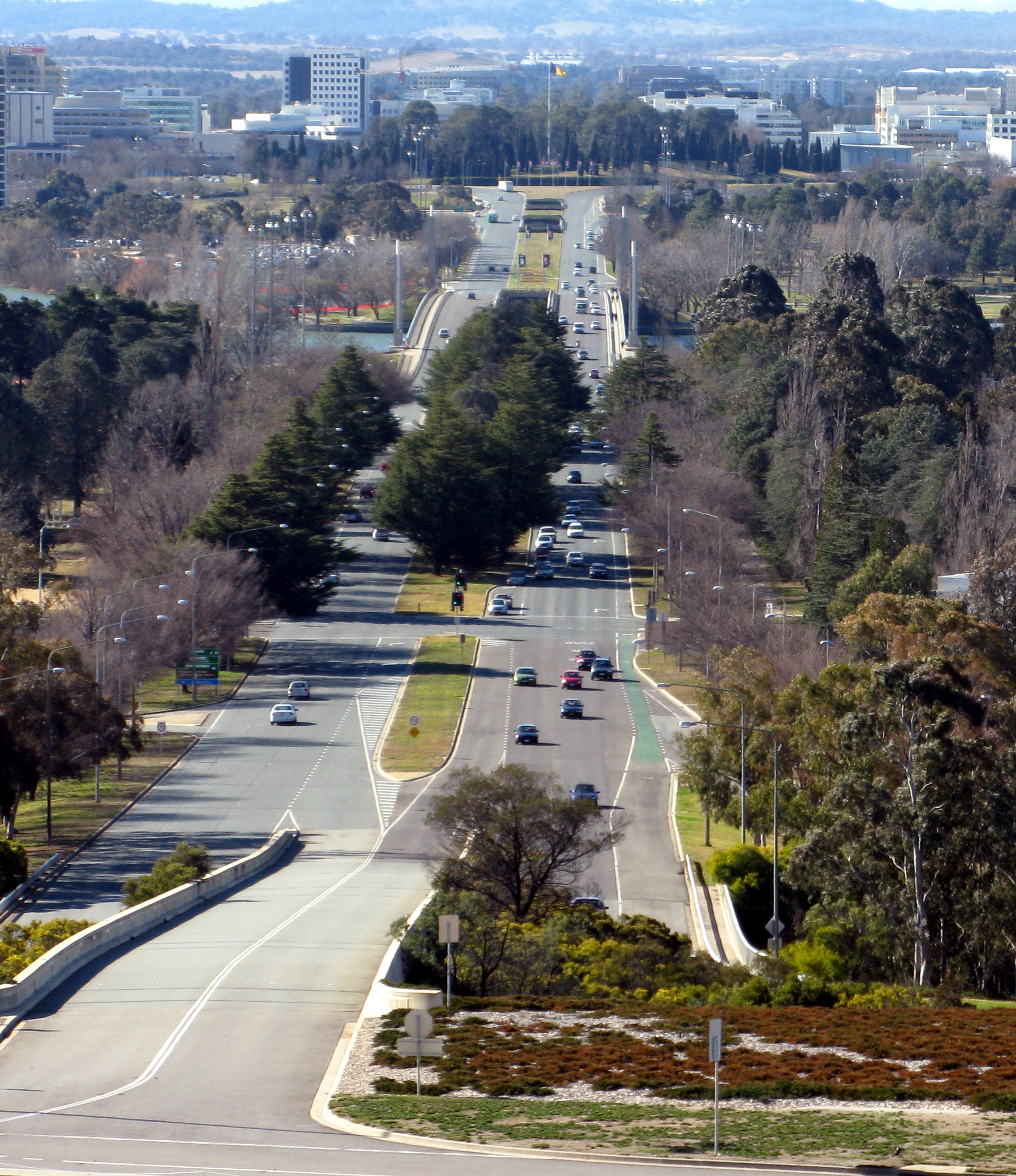
- Commonwealth Avenue, from Capital Hill

General information
- Type: Highway
- Length: 2.26 km (1.4 mi)
- Route number(s): A23 (2013–present) (Civic–Capital Hill)
- Former route number: National Route 23 (1955–2013); ACT Tourist Drive 1 (Civic–Capital Hill); ACT Tourist Drive 2 (Civic–Yarralumla); ACT Tourist Drive 6 (Yarralumla–Capital Hill); ACT Tourist Drive 7 (Civic–Barton)

Major junctions
- North end: Vernon Circle; Civic, Australian Capital Territory
- London Circuit; Parkes Way; State Circle (n/bound)); Capital Circle (s/bound))
- South end: Parliament Drive; Capital Hill, Australian Capital Territory

Location(s)
- District: Canberra Central
- Major suburbs: Civic, Acton, Parkes, Yarralumla, Capital Hill

Highway system
- Highways in Australia; National Highway • Freeways in Australia; Road infrastructure in Canberra

Commonwealth Avenue (route A23) is a major road in Canberra, Australian Capital Territory, Australia. It connects Civic with South Canberra. Specifically, it runs between City Hill and Capital Hill.

== History ==
The first Commonwealth Avenue Bridge was constructed in 1928; that replaced a ford across the Molonglo River; and two earlier bridges. The current bridge was completed in 1963.

== Description ==
Commonwealth Avenue is a six-lane-wide road with a wide median down the middle. The road crosses Lake Burley Griffin over the Commonwealth Avenue Bridge. The road is connected with Parkes Way by freeway style on-ramps. Along its length on the northern side are the Roman Catholic Archbishop's residence and Commonwealth Park. On the south side of the lake the road is lined with large trees and is bounded by the suburb of Parkes on the east and Yarralumla on the west. Significant sites along this stretch include the Albert Hall, the Hotel Canberra (Hyatt) and the High Commissions of the United Kingdom, New Zealand and Canada.

Upon reaching Capital Hill, the road turns into Capital Circle which circles around Parliament House before connecting with Adelaide Avenue which connects it with Woden Valley. There is a ramp at the end of Commonwealth Avenue which allows access to Parliament House.

Between the spans on the southern side are four granite stones from the 1817 Waterloo Bridge across the River Thames in London, two at each end of the bridge. These were presented to Australia after the 1817 bridge was demolished in the 1940s and replaced by a modern structure. A plaque reads, in part, "Stones such as these from the bridge were presented to Australia and other parts of the British world to further historic links in the British Commonwealth of Nations."

== Gallery ==
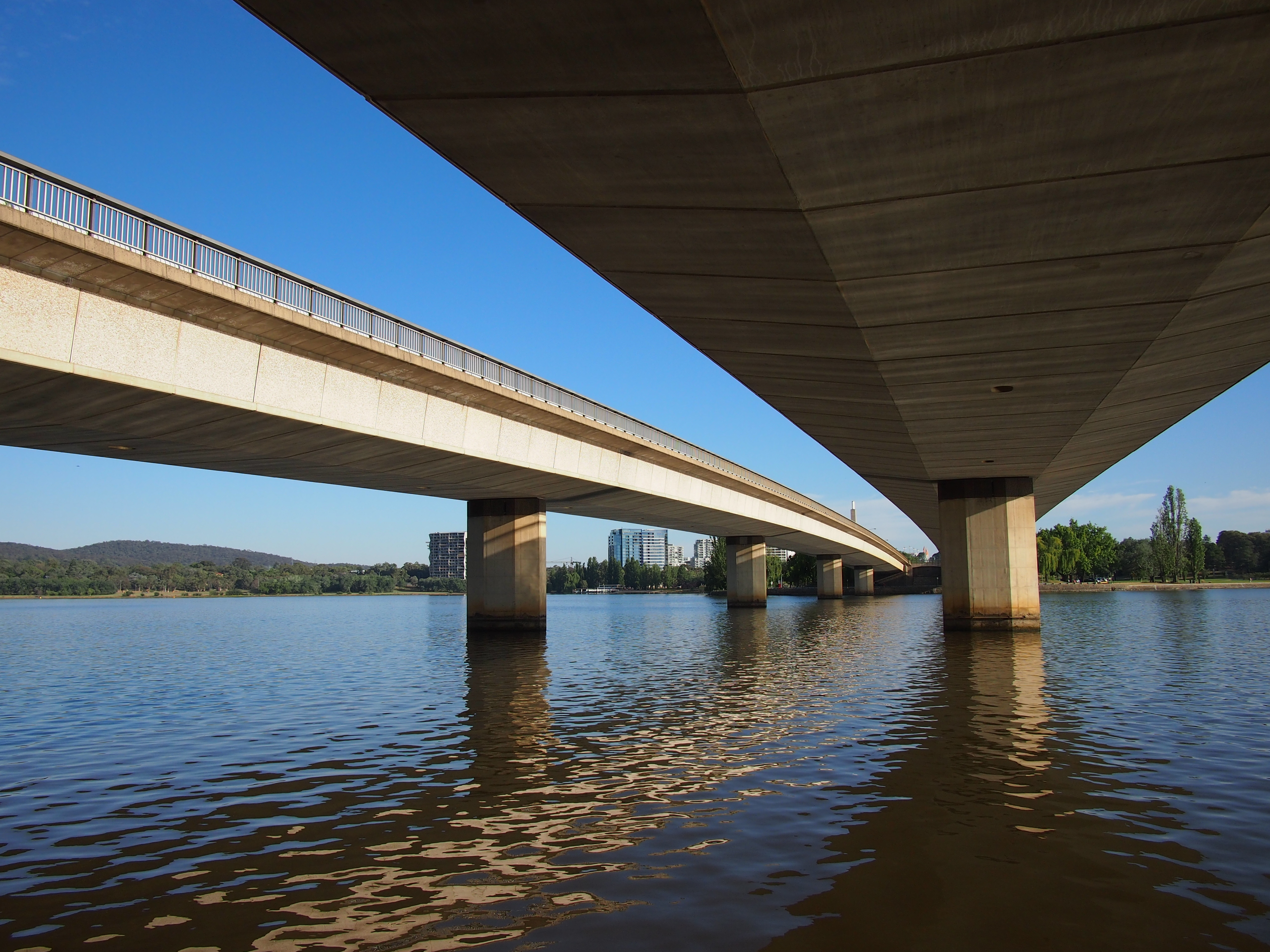
Commonwealth Avenue crossing Lake Burley Griffin at Commonwealth Avenue Bridge

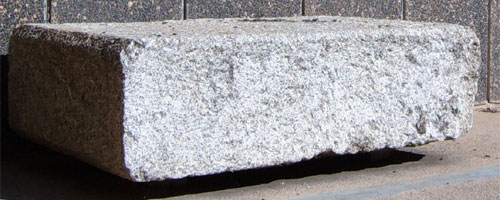
One of four granite stones from the 1817 Waterloo Bridge, London

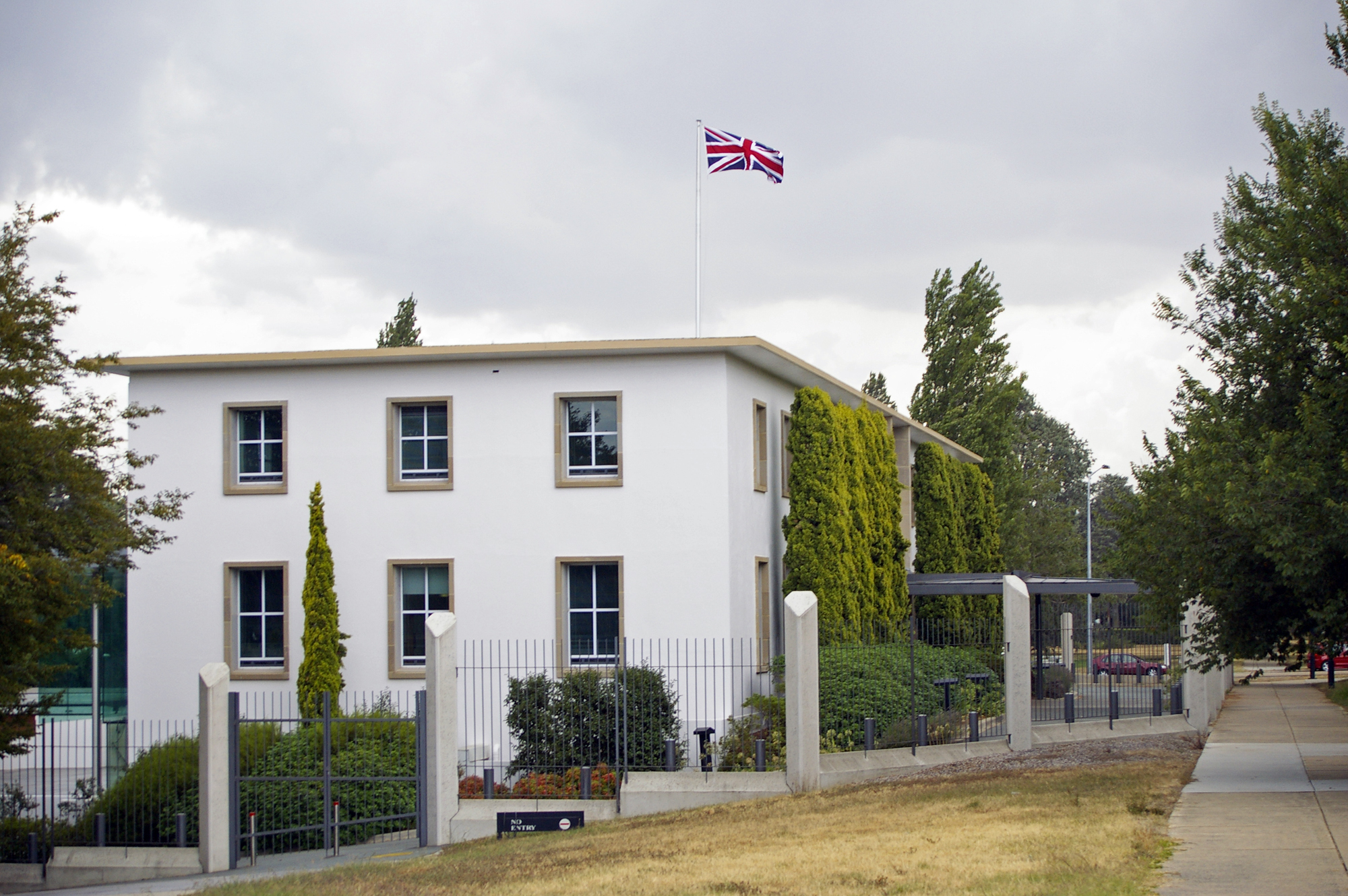
The British High Commission building on Commonwealth Avenue

== See also ==
- List of road routes in the Australian Capital Territory
- Parliamentary Triangle, Canberra
