= Canberra Avenue =

Road in Canberra, Australia

Canberra Avenue Australian Capital Territory
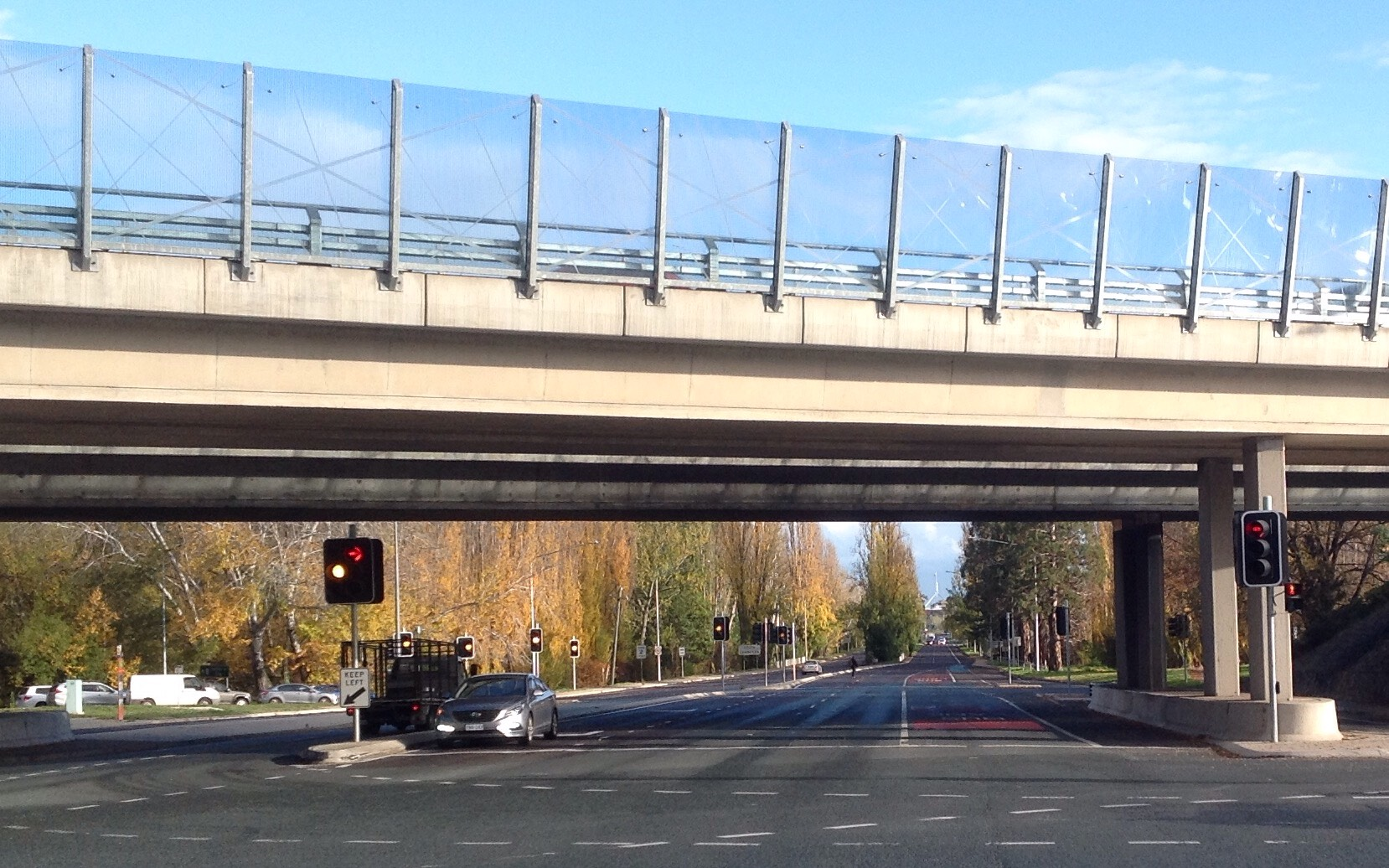
- Canberra Avenue in May 2020

General information
- Type: Road
- Length: 8.8 km (5.5 mi)
- Route number(s): A23 (2013–present) (Capital Hill–Fyshwick); B52 (2013–present) (Symonston–ACT/NSW border); B52 (2013–present) (NSW/ACT border–Queanbeyan)
- Former route number: National Route 23 (1955–2013) (Capital Hill–Fyshwick); National Route 52 (1974–2013) (Fyshwick–Queanbeyan); ACT Tourist Route 5 (Capital Hill–Fyshwick)

Major junctions
- West end: Capital Circle; Capital Hill, Australian Capital Territory
- State Circle; Wentworth Avenue; Monaro Highway; Hindmarsh Drive; Lanyon Drive
- East end: Farrer Place; Queanbeyan, New South Wales

Canberra Avenue is a major road in Canberra, Australian Capital Territory. It is the primary link between the nation's capital and the city of Queanbeyan, New South Wales which lies on the territory's eastern border. The route also passes historic two historic landmarks; Manuka Oval, opened in 1929 and the Church of Saint Andrew in the suburb of Forrest.
