= Capital Circle =

Road in Canberra, Australia

Capital Circle Australian Capital Territory
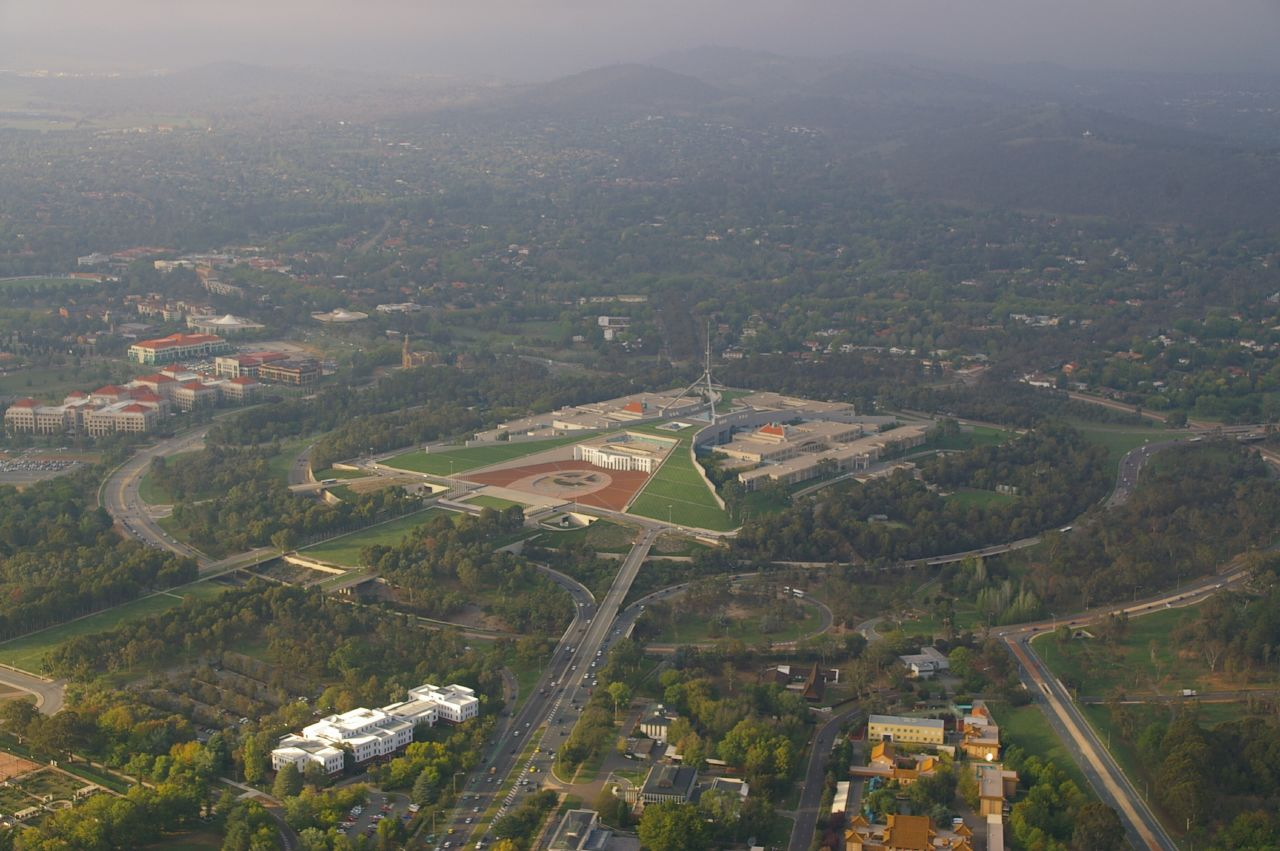
- Capital Circle is the inner of two circular concentric roads that orbit Parliament House.
- Location of Capital Circle in the Australian Capital Territory
- Coordinates: 35°18′28.8″S 149°7′30″E

General information
- Type: Freeway
- Length: 2.4 km (1.5 mi)
- Route number(s): A23 (2013–present); Commonwealth Avenue to Canberra Avenue, North to West section only)
- Former route number: National Route 23 (1955–2013); Commonwealth Avenue to Canberra Avenue, North to West section only)
- Ring road around: Capital Hill

Major junctions
North to West section
- North end: Commonwealth Avenue; Parkes, Australian Capital Territory
- Canberra Avenue
- West end: Adelaide Avenue; Deakin, Australian Capital Territory
West to North section
- West end: Adelaide Avenue; Yarralumla, Australian Capital Territory
- North end: Commonwealth Avenue; Parkes, Australian Capital Territory

Highway system
- Highways in Australia; National Highway • Freeways in Australia; Road infrastructure in Canberra

Capital Circle is a circular road surrounding Capital Hill in the centre of Canberra, Australia. It is one of three concentric roads on the hill, with State Circle the outermost and Parliament Drive the innermost. There are no buildings on Capital Circle. Parliament Drive surrounds New Parliament House.

Roads named for each of Australia's state capitals converge at Capital Circle or State Circle. The main roads leading from the circle are Commonwealth Avenue to the north and Canberra Avenue and Adelaide Avenue to the south.

== Design ==
Capital Circle is a three-lane road. All traffic runs in a clockwise direction. The road does not form a complete circle, as a section under Commonwealth Avenue was closed a few years after opening due to the high number of crashes apparently resulting partly from the proximity of the entrance from Commonwealth Avenue and the exit to Kings Avenue. Vehicles are now forced to exit at Commonwealth Avenue.

== History ==
Capital Circle was built by Leighton Contractors opening on 3 August 1971. As part of the construction of New Parliament House, a 160-metre tunnel was built under Federation Mall in December 1986. It was designed by Maunsell & Partners and built by Leighton Contractors.
