= Parliament House, Canberra =

Seat of the Parliament of Australia

Parliament House
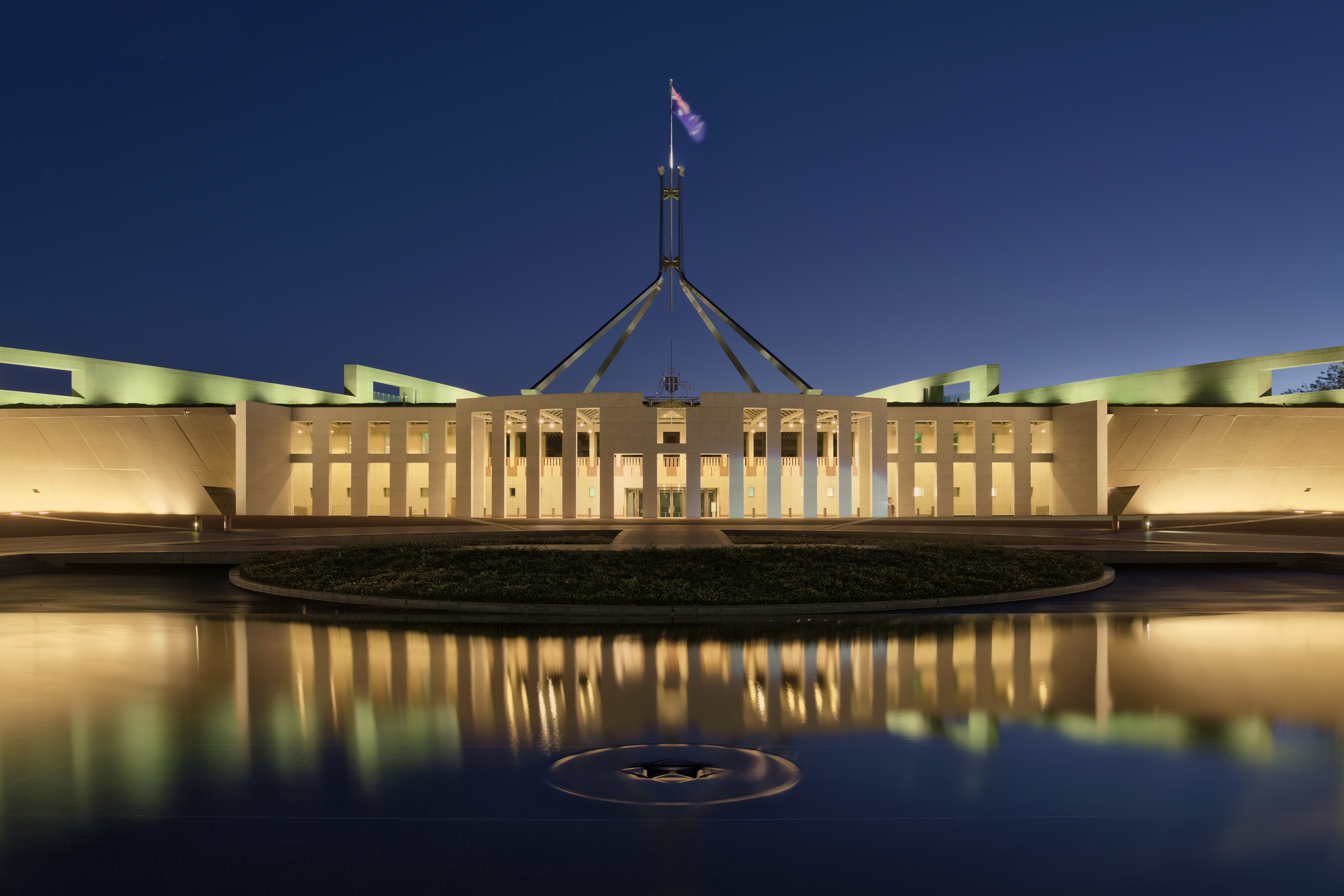
- The main entrance at blue hour

General information
- Architectural style: Postmodern
- Location: Canberra, Australia
- Coordinates: 35°18′29″S 149°07′28″E
- Groundbreaking: 18 September 1980; 46 years ago
- Construction started: 21 January 1981; 45 years ago
- Opened: 9 May 1988; 38 years ago
- Cost: $1.1 billion

Height
- Height: 107 m (351 ft)

Technical details
- Floor area: 250,000 m^{2} (2,700,000 sq ft)

Design and construction
- Architect: Romaldo Giurgola
- Architecture firm: Mitchell Giurgola & Thorp Architects
- Structural engineer: Irwinconsult
- Main contractor: Concrete Constructions; John Holland

Other information
- Number of rooms: More than 4,500

Website
- aph.gov.au

Parliament House is the meeting place of the Parliament of Australia, the legislative branch of Australia's federal tier of government. The building also houses the core of the executive (the Australian Government), containing the cabinet room and offices of the prime minister and other federal ministers.

Located in Canberra, Parliament House is situated at the southern apex of the National Triangle atop and beneath Capital Hill at the intersection of Commonwealth, Adelaide, Canberra and Kings Avenues, and enclosed by the State Circle.

Parliament House was designed by Mitchell/Giurgola & Thorp Architects and constructed by a joint venture comprising Concrete Constructions and John Holland. The building replaced Old Parliament House, where the Federal Parliament sat from 1927 until 1988, when members and their staff moved "up the hill" to the so-named New Parliament House. The current Parliament House was officially opened on 9 May 1988 by Elizabeth II, Queen of Australia. It cost more than $1.1 billion (equivalent to about $2.6 billion in 2022) to build.

== History ==
=== Before the establishment of Canberra ===
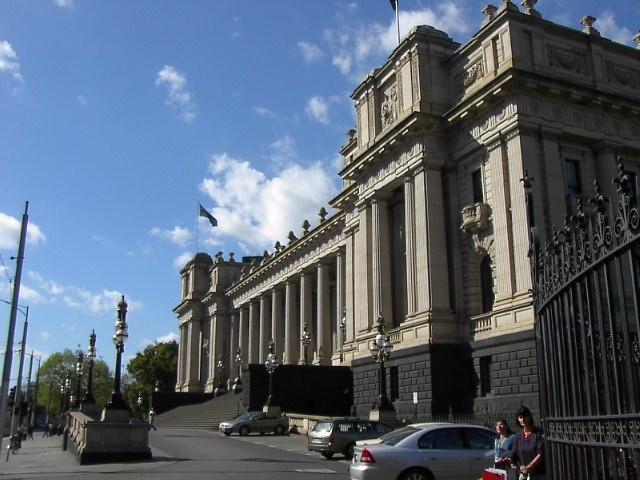
Parliament House, Melbourne, was home to Federal Parliament for 26 years from 1901 to 1927.

In 1901, when the six British colonies in Australia federated to form the Commonwealth of Australia, Melbourne and Sydney were the two largest cities in the country, but the long history of rivalry between them meant that neither city would accept the other as the national capital. However a compromise was reached and implemented in section 125 of the Australian Constitution, whereby the capital would be in a federal territory located in NSW; however it had to be located at least 100 miles from Sydney. The Parliament would sit in Melbourne until the new capital was completed.

In 1909, after much argument, the Parliament decided that the new capital would be in the southern part of New South Wales, on the site which is now Canberra. The Commonwealth acquired control over the land in 1911, but World War I intervened, and nothing was done for some years to build the city. Federal Parliament did not leave Melbourne until 1927.

In the meantime the Australian Parliament met in the 19th-century edifice of Parliament House, Melbourne, while the Victorian State Parliament met in the nearby Royal Exhibition Building for 26 years.

=== Old Parliament House ===
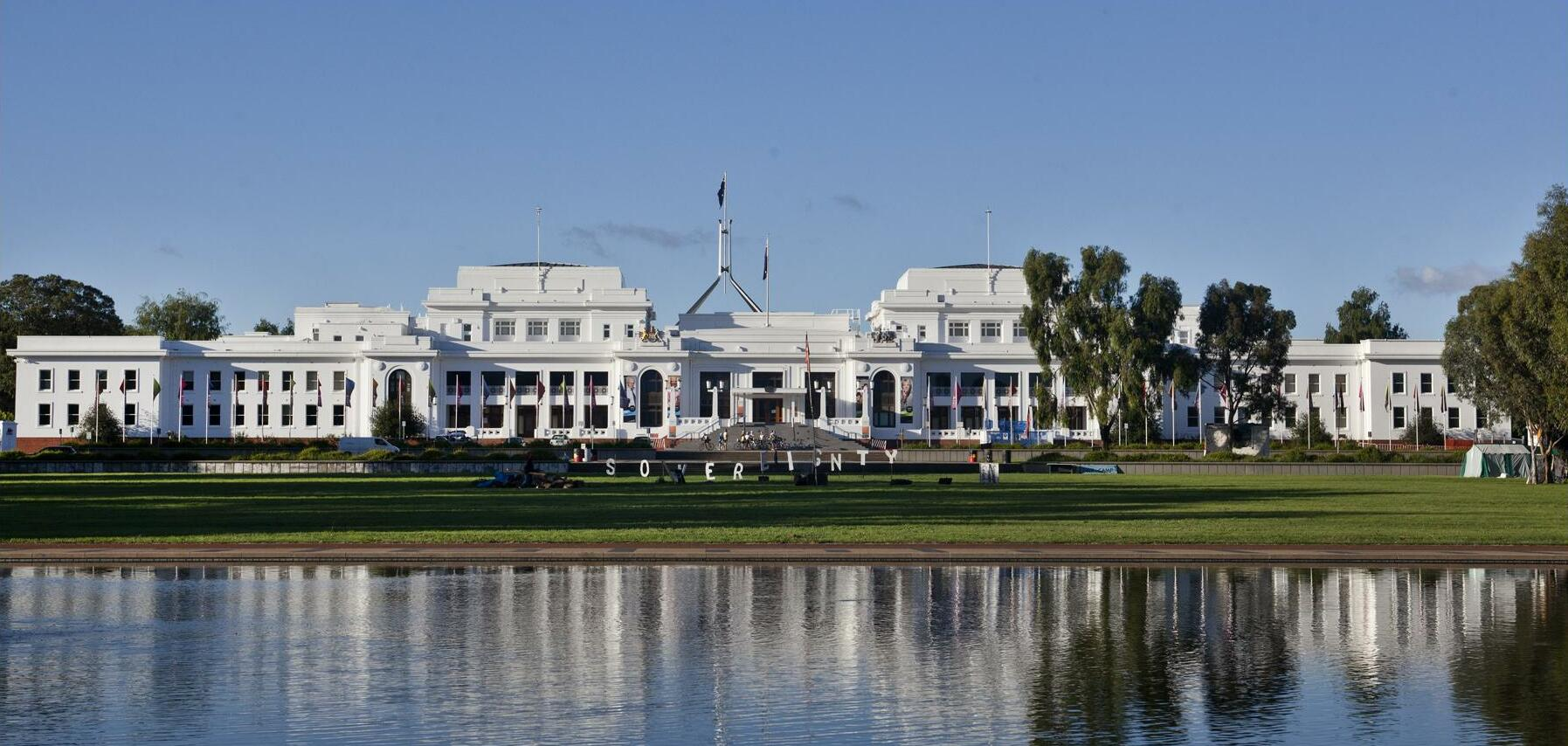
Old Parliament House

After World War I the Federal Capital Advisory Committee was established to prepare Canberra to be the seat of government, including the construction of a Parliament House. The committee decided that it would be best to erect a provisional building, to serve for a predicted 50 years until a new, permanent House could be built. In the end, Old Parliament House was Parliament's home for 61 years. In the last decade of its use as a parliament, the building had a chronic shortage of available space.

=== Design and construction ===
Timelapse of the facade of Parliament House.

In Walter Burley Griffin's original design for Canberra, Parliament House would be located on Camp Hill, located between Old Parliament House and Capital Hill. Instead a "Capitol" building would be placed on Capital Hill, that would hold the national archives and act as a public assembly. Placing Parliament beneath the Capitol building would then represent the people standing above their representatives. Debate over the site continued over the years, with Menzies in 1958 supporting a site on the shore of the lake. However, there remained support for the Capital Hill site, which culminated in the passage of the Parliament Act 1974 with a free vote, which determined that the Capital Hill site should be used.

In 1978 the Fraser government decided to proceed with a new building on Capital Hill, and the Parliament House Construction Authority was created. A two-stage competition was announced, for which the Authority consulted the Royal Australian Institute of Architects and, together with the National Capital Development Commission, made available to competitors a brief and competition documents. The design competition drew 329 entries from 29 countries.

The competition winner was the Philadelphia-based architectural firm of Mitchell/Giurgola, with the on-site work directed by the Italian-born architect Romaldo Giurgola, with a design which involved burying most of the building under Capital Hill, and capping the edifice with an enormous spire topped by a large Australian flag. The spires supporting the flag pole traces the outline of the triangular capitol building envisioned by Griffin. The facades included deliberate imitation of some of the patterns of the Old Parliament House, so that there is a slight resemblance despite the massive difference of scale.

Giurgola placed an emphasis on the visual aesthetics of the building by using landscape architect Peter G Rolland to direct civil engineers, a reversal of the traditional roles in Australia. Rolland played a pivotal role in the design, development and coordination of all surface elements including pool design, paving, conceptual lighting and artwork locations. Horticultural experts from the Australian National Botanic Gardens and a government nursery were consulted on plant selection. Permanent irrigation has been limited to only the more formal areas. Irwinconsult was commissioned to provide structural engineering, including quality assurance of all structural elements, to deliver a building with a designed lifespan of 200 years.

Construction began in 1981, and the House was intended to be ready by Australia Day, 26 January 1988, the 200th anniversary of European settlement in Australia. It was expected to cost $220 million. Neither the deadline nor the budget was met.

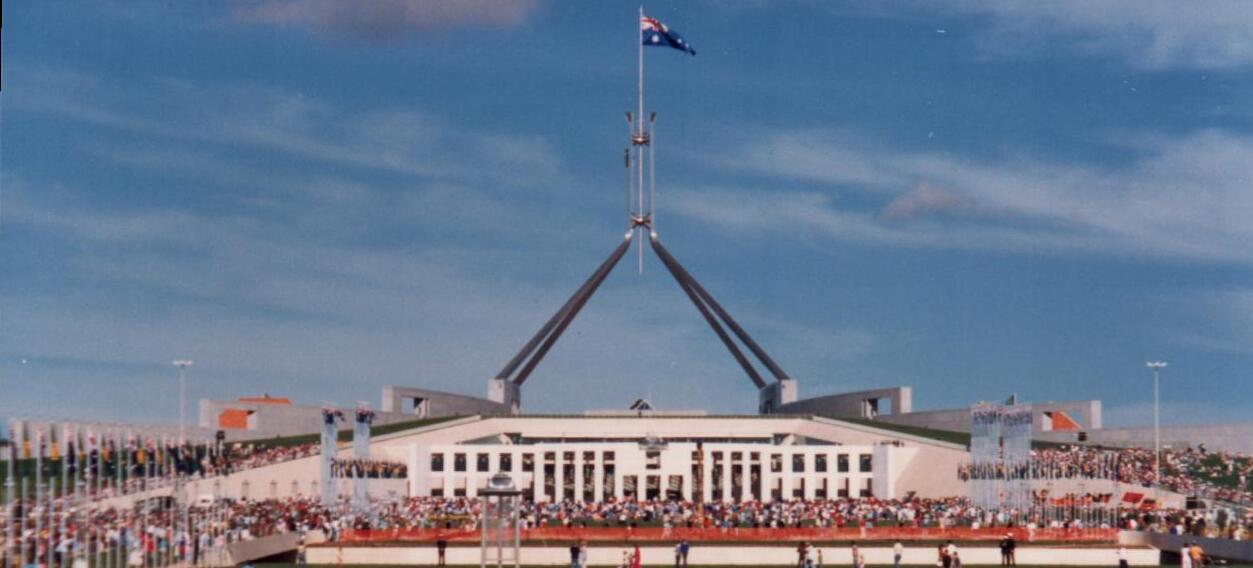
Opening ceremony in 1988

The building was opened by Queen Elizabeth II on 9 May 1988, the anniversary of the opening of both the first Federal Parliament in Melbourne on 9 May 1901 by the Duke of Cornwall and York (later King George V), and of Provisional Parliament House in Canberra on 9 May 1927 by the Duke of York (later King George VI).

The flag flown from the 81-metre (266-foot) flagpole is 12.8 by 6.4 m (42 by 21 ft), about the size of half a tennis court. The flagpole weighs 250 tonnes and is made of polished stainless steel from Newcastle, with the steel ball resting at the top of the flagpole manufactured by Leussink Engineering Pty Ltd. It was designed to be the pinnacle of Parliament House and is an easily recognisable symbol of national government. It is visible by day from outside and inside Parliament House and floodlit at night. The flag itself weighs approximately 15 kg (33 lb).

The site covers 80 acres (32 hectares). The building was designed to sit above Old Parliament House when seen from a distance. About one million cubic metres (35,000,000 cubic feet) of rock had to be excavated from the site. It was used to fill low-lying areas in the city. Most of the granite used was sourced from Australia. Twice the amount needed was quarried as a very high standard of granite was required particularly for the curved walls.

It was proposed originally to demolish Old Parliament House so that there would be an uninterrupted vista from the New Parliament House to Lake Burley Griffin and the Australian War Memorial, but there were successful representations for the preservation of the historic building, which now houses a parliamentary museum. The original idea was for Parliament House to be open free to the public, and the sweeping lawns leading up to the entrances were intended to symbolise this.

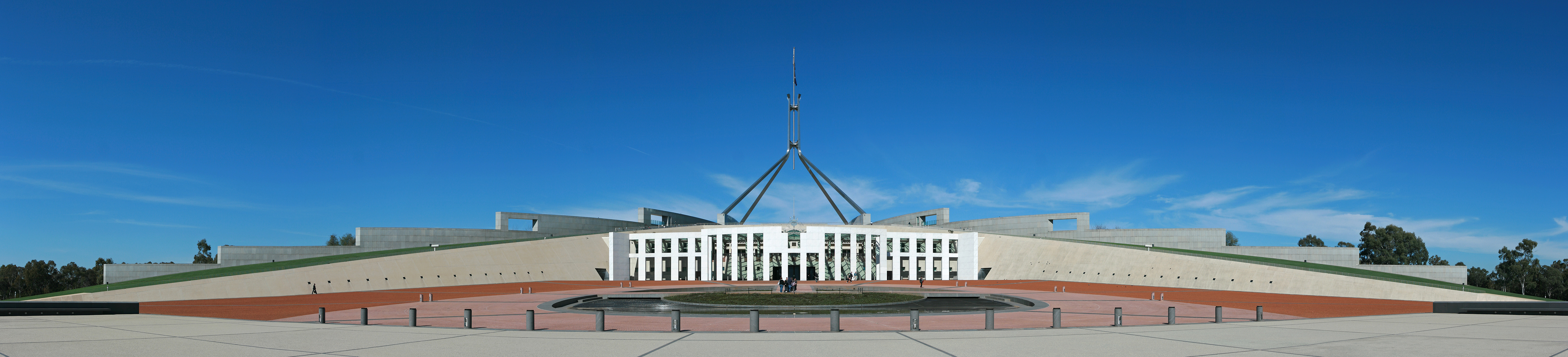
The front architecture built into Capital Hill, including the forecourt and main entrance, and illustrating a ground-level view of the boomerang-shaped design

==== Height ====
The top of the Parliament House roof slab/terrace was set at RL617 RL617 "is equal to the base of the flag pole of Parliament House".. RL617 (or RL2025 feet) was the limit recommended in 1972 to match the AMP Building and Russell Offices (Note: The eastern 10 story block of the Defence Headquarters building group in Russell.). In 1972 the location of the future Parliament House was unknown, however RL2025 was the "assumed level of its roof, one hundred feet above Camp Hill i.e. RL.2025", which was "in fact the roof level of the highest buildings" in Russell and the City.

The building has been claimed to be four metres (13 feet) higher than the original height of the hill. A 1972 NCDC report states the "top (new level)" of Capital Hill was RL2005 feet (and "top of flagstaff" was RL2109 feet). A 1911 map utilising surveying by Charles Scrivener recorded the peak as 2005 feet above sea level. (Note: With "Datum of levels Cooma Railway Survey")

"Until recently" before 1972 there was a controlling Central Canberra height limit of RL2000 (feet). This is contradicted by a January 1989 report stating the NCDC first introduced height controls in Civic in 1968, that the Commission "adopted an absolute limit of RL617, being the intended height of the Towers of the New Parliament House on Camp Hill", and "The 20 year-old limit of RL 617 is still valid"

The 1972 NCDC report stated RL2000 "corresponds with the top of Capital Hill".

== External features ==
The design of Parliament House is anchored around two large curved walls that divides the structure into four quadrants. Clockwise these are: the formal entrance and event space, the House of Representatives, the executive wing and the Senate. These walls are sunken into the hill so that the building appears to emerge from the land, rather that towering over those beneath it. The ability for people to walk on the grass roofs over their representatives also represents the people being above the government. The entire structure is surmounted by an 81-metre (266 ft) flagpole flying the Australian flag. The flag is the largest in the country, measuring 6.4 metres (21 feet) by 12.8 metres (42 feet), around the size of a double-decker bus.

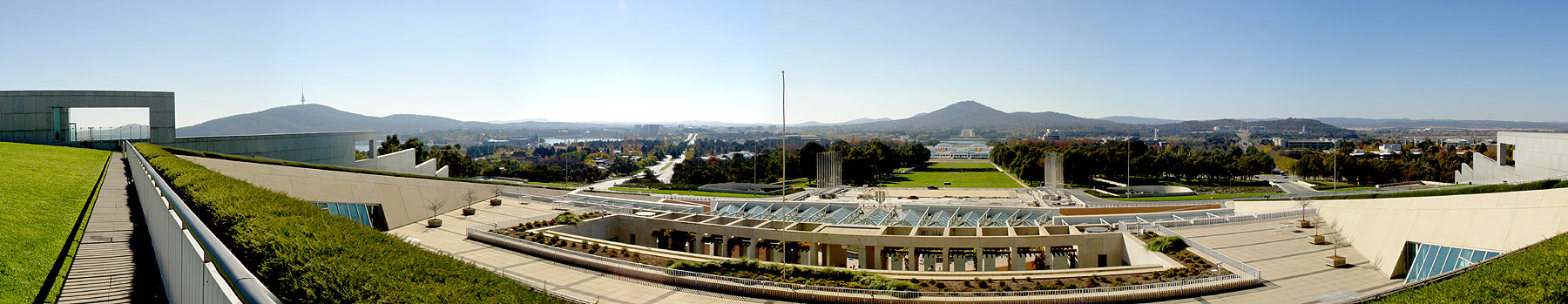
Panoramic view from the roof of Parliament House which is now accessed internally via lifts

=== Forecourt ===
Visitors enter Parliament House through the forecourt, designed by architect Robert Woodward, surrounded on each side by a slowly rising wall and approaching the entrance which mirrors that of Old Parliament House, despite the massive increase in scale. The gravel of sunburnt red and the green fountain represents the outback, the bush and the billabong, all symbolic of Australia. This and a large mosaic, Possum and Wallaby Dreaming, emphasises the enduring Aboriginal connection to the land. The mosaic is 196-square-metre (2,110 sq ft) forecourt mosaic and was designed by Indigenous Australian artist Michael Nelson Jagamarra. It depicts the tracks of several native animals (in white) moving towards the central circle, representing that Canberra is a gathering place. The style is reminiscent of the traditional sand paintings of the artists tribe, located near Papunya. Three stonemasons took 18 months to two years to hand-cut the 90,000 granite setts which were used in the 196-square-metre (2,110 sq ft) artwork. The mosaic was digitised in April 2019 from a series of photographs taken from five metres above the artwork.

=== Gardens ===
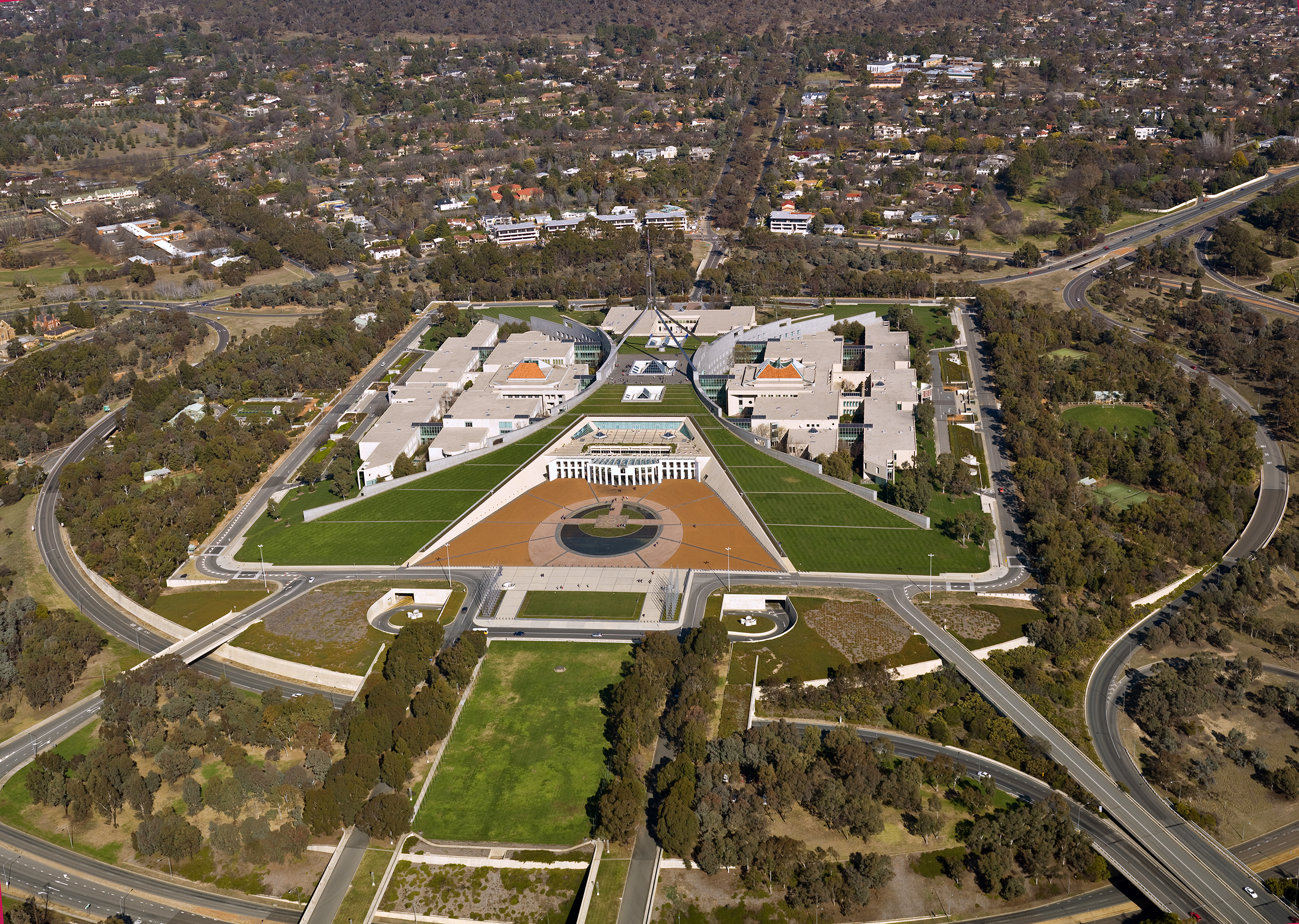
Aerial view of Parliament House

Immediately behind Parliament House's large, extruding façade is the public Queen's Terrace and café. The entire complex features a series of about seventeen internal, private courtyards, which are sometimes accessible via tour groups. Among these is a feature known as the "budget tree", it is known as such because turns into a vibrant red colour around May when the budget is usually delivered. The complex itself is surrounded by gardens and replanted bushland of the former Kurrajong Hill. Features include Chinese guardian lions in the formal eastern gardens, an RSL fountain and armillary sphere. Sports courts and recreation facilities are also available in these gardens, including an oval where politicians and journalists sometimes play in social games. There is also a hut from Charles Scrivener's 1909 survey in the external ring of bushland.

== Layout ==
The Parliament House contains 4,700 rooms, and many areas are open to the public. The main foyer contains a marble staircase and leads to the Great Hall, which has a large tapestry on display based on the Arthur Boyd painting Untitled (Shoalhaven Landscape). The House of Representatives chamber is decorated green, while the Senate chamber has a red colour scheme. At the centre of the building between the two chambers is the Members' Hall, which has a water feature directly beneath a glass roof and the large central flag. The public may not access the hall, but may view it from above on a balcony.

=== Foyer ===
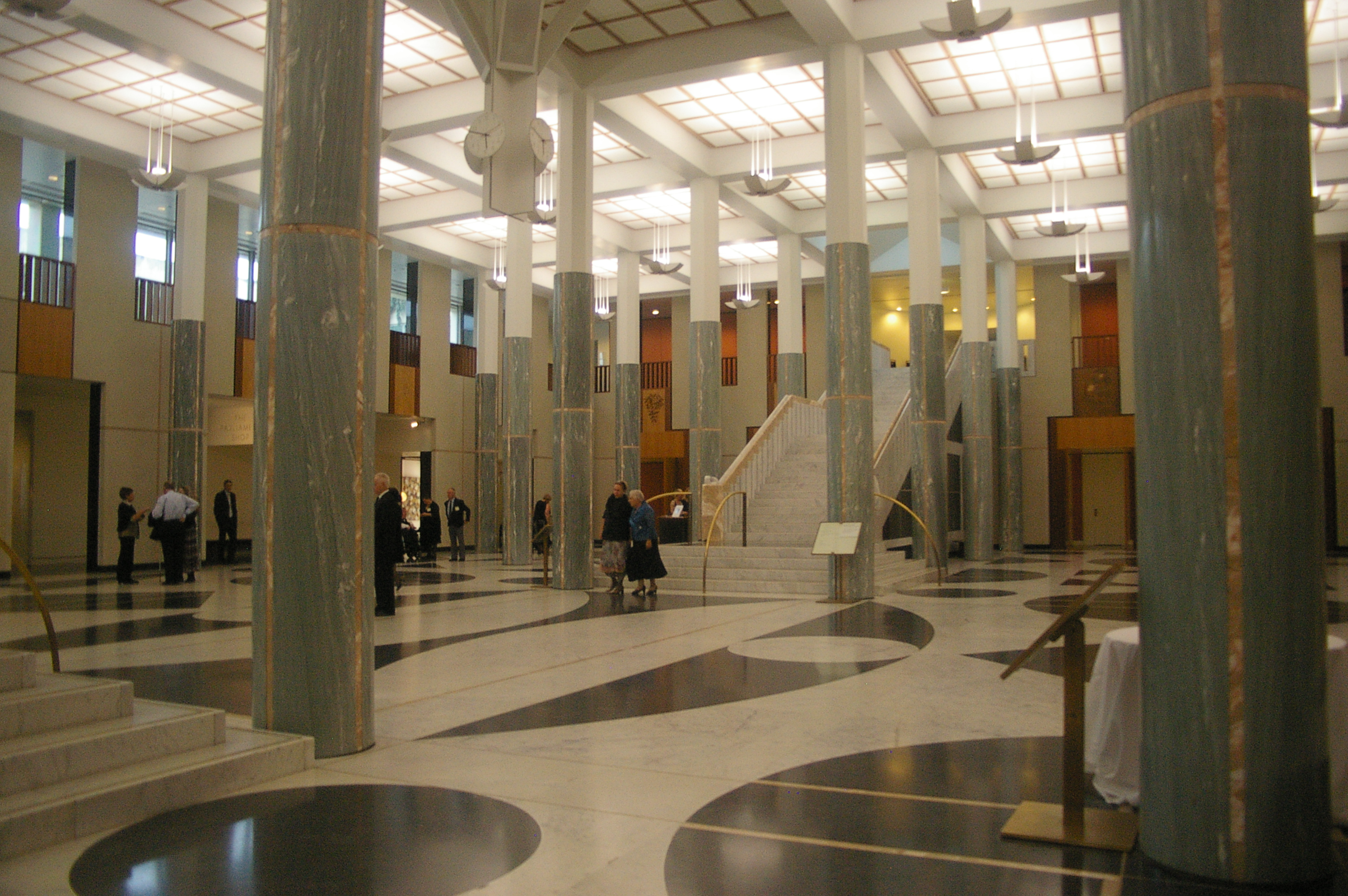
The marble foyer

The main entrance opens into the foyer, the most monumental and luxuriously decorated space in the building. As this is the primary public space in the building, this again represents the greater importance of the people as compared to their representatives. The floor is of polished black and white marble, in which on one step a fossilised ancient prawn can be seen. In contrast to the expanse of the forecourt, the foyer is filled with grey-green columns, the colour of gum trees. These are inspired by various column supported temples, such as the Hypostyle Hall of the Great Temple of Ammon, Karnak and the Hall of the Hundred Columns in the Palace of Persepolis. The columns also provides a reference point to visitors, with the columns acting as a human size natural gathering point. To the left and right are two enormous staircases facing each other, modelled on those of the Doge's Palace in Venice. Collectively, these ancient European styles represent the influence on European culture in Australia and specifically the ancient Greek and Roman notions of democracy.

Around the room are 20 timber marquetry panels depicting Australian flora and fauna, once again proving a link to the land. Six of the panels depicts the animal, flower and bird emblems of each of the states, a concept that evolved from a previous proposal to depict the coats of arms of the states. Other panels shows plants used by Aboriginal people and those important to early settlers.

=== Great Hall ===
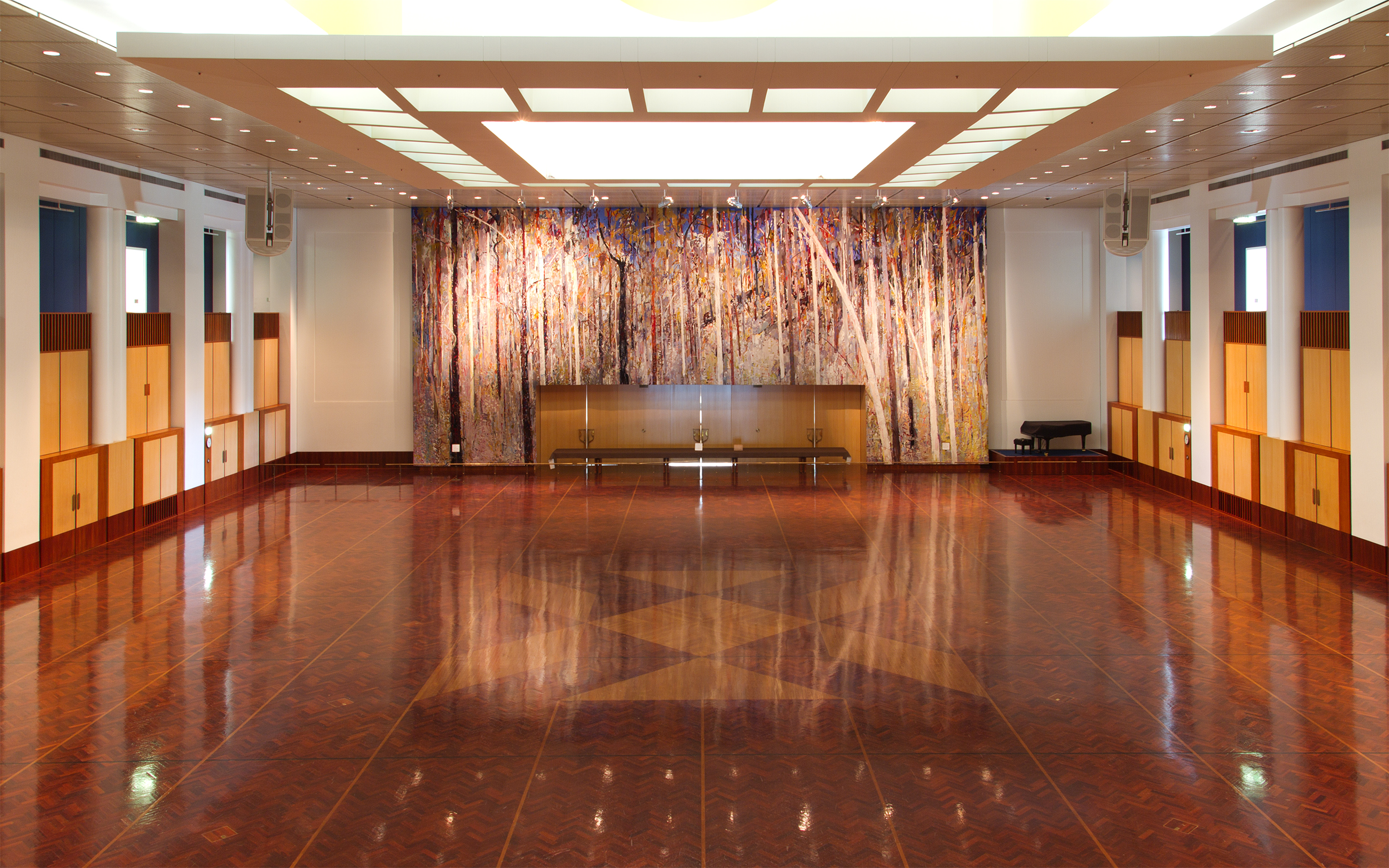
The Great Hall in Parliament House. The tapestry at the rear of the room is an enlarged version of an Arthur Boyd painting, and at 20 by 9 metres (66 ft × 30 ft) is one of the largest tapestries in the world.

The public entrance to Parliament House opens into the main foyer leading into the Great Hall, which represents the period of early European settlement. The rich marble of the foyer is replaced with soft woods; the cramped columns become a vast open space filled with light. The end of the hall features a tapestry based on a painting by Arthur Boyd, the original of which is also displayed in the building. Once again, this tapestry does not depict any people, but emphasises the importance of land and place. On the eastern wall of the gallery of the great hall is an embroidery, designed by Kay Lawrence, measuring 15 m long and 65 cm high. This is a similar size to the Bayeux Tapestry, which despite its name is also an embroidery. It depicts early Australian history through changes to the landscape with the arrival of settlers. It was created by thousands of ordinary embroiderers who each worked on small sections of the work, to be later created into a whole.

Functions that have parliamentary and federal relevance often take place here, but the Great Hall is also open to functions for the general public, such as weddings, and the nearby University of Canberra hosts graduation ceremonies here.

=== Members' Hall ===
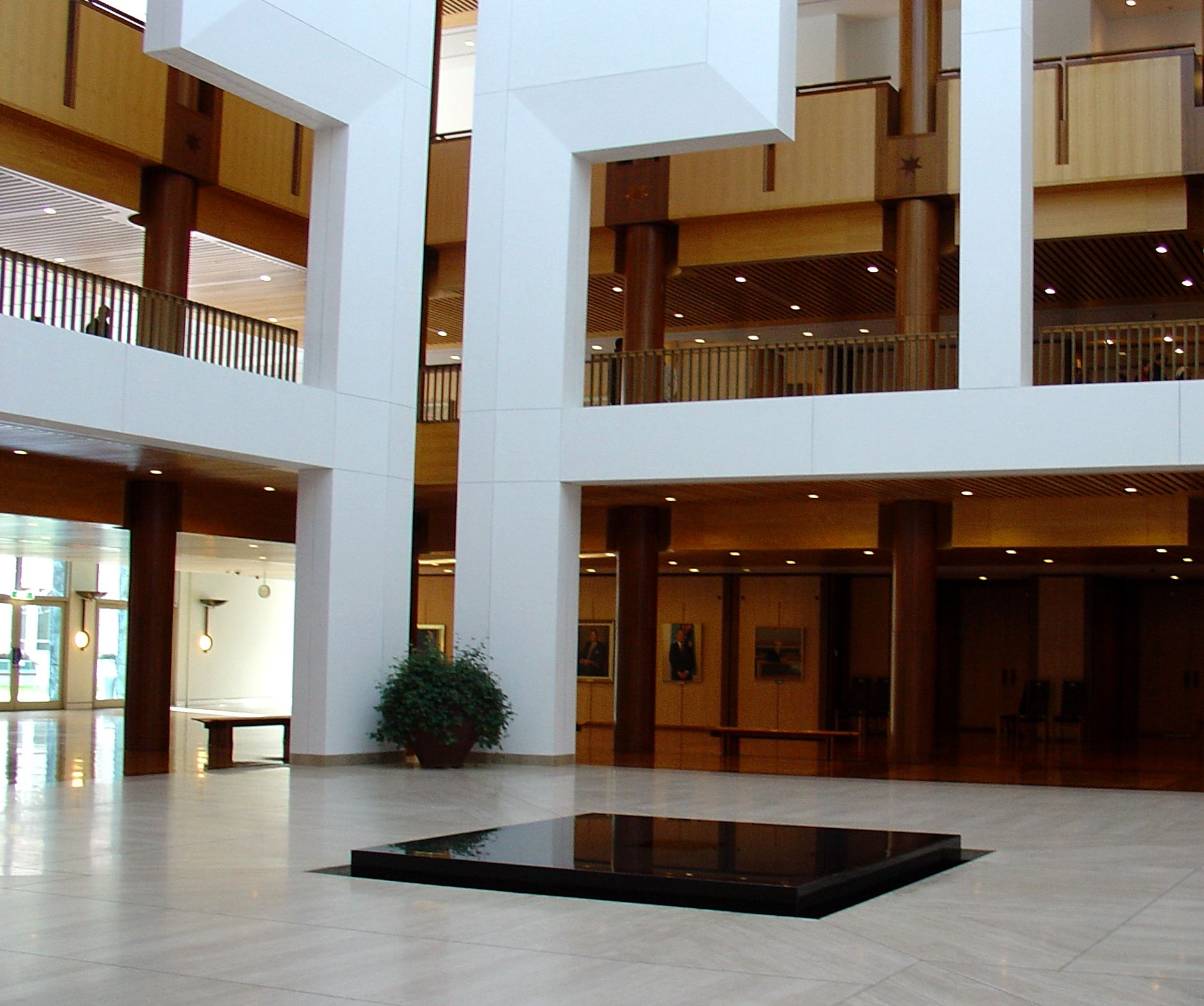
The Members' Hall

Below the tapestry of the Great Hall is a removable division that opens onto the Members' Hall, which has a water feature at its centre. This is an area restricted to security-classified occupants of the building and special visitors. Directly ahead of the Members' Hall is the Ministerial Wing, housing the office suites of the Prime Minister and government ministers. The Members' Hall has access to the House of Representatives and the Senate buildings to the left and right of the main entrance to the halls respectively. Public access to the visitors' galleries and the Main Committee Room is via an upper level reached by marble staircases ascending from the entrance foyer. There are also 19 committee rooms that are open to the public and a highly secure Cabinet Room on the ground floor.

=== House of Representatives ===
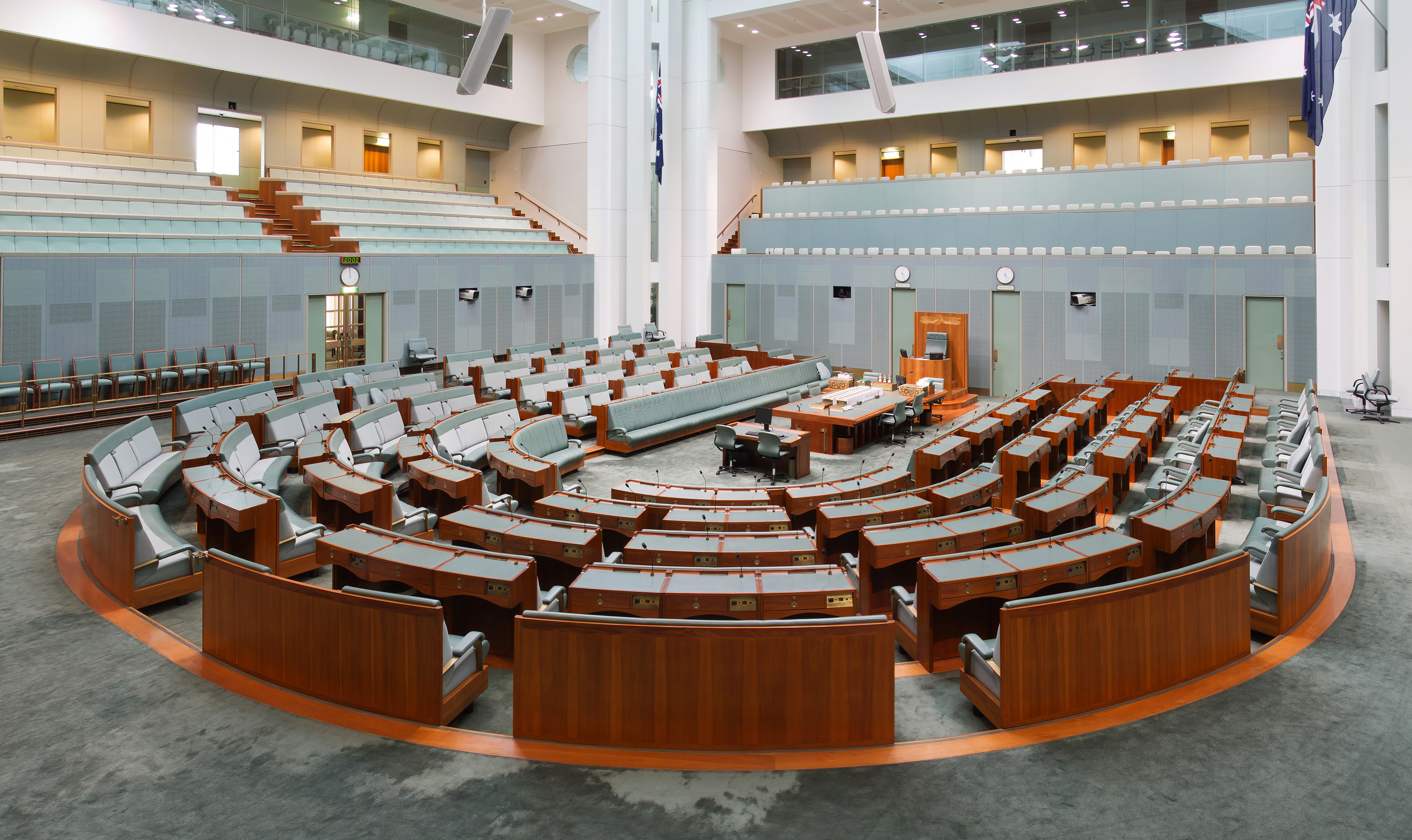
The House of Representatives

In a reflection of the colour scheme of the British House of Commons, the House of Representatives is decorated in green. However, the colour is muted to suggest the colour of eucalyptus leaves, or the Australian bush.

The chamber itself is designed to seat up to 172 members, with room to accommodate a total of 240 with temporary seating. An additional 38 seats are available for use by members in the separate Federation Chamber. From the perspective of the image, the press gallery is ahead, with public galleries containing 388 seats to the left and right. Soundproofed galleries for school groups are directly above these, as no talking is permitted when the House members are present.

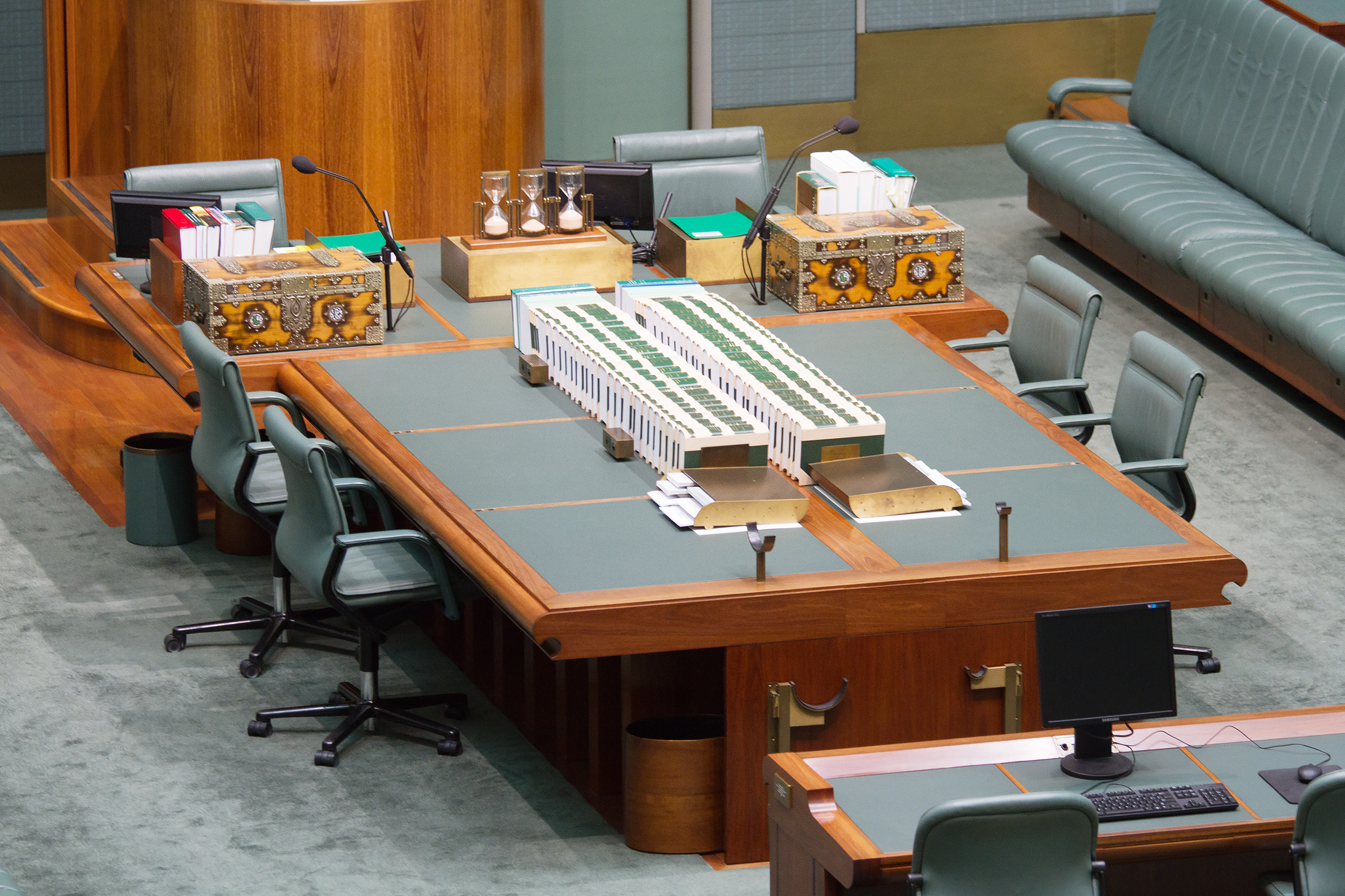
A part of the front bench, and the despatch boxes

Frontbench (Cabinet) members approach the table with the ornate box (pictured), known as the despatch box, to speak. The despatch boxes are a replica of the same boxes used by the UK House of Commons and were donated by King George V in 1927 to mark the opening of Provisional Parliament House. They contain forms and religious texts used to swear in new members. Backbenchers have a microphone on their desk and merely stand to speak (unless they cannot stand), in accordance with standing order 60. Backbench members are assigned a place where they sit at the beginning of each Parliament, and may only make contributions from "their place".

The table contains a row of books containing laws the Parliament has passed. Also on the table are copies of the standing orders, dictionaries, House of Representatives Practice and Hansard. The clerk and deputy clerk sit in front of the speaker and are responsible for ringing the bells during a division (voting). In front of the clerk are the hour glasses. The outer glasses measure four minutes and the middle glass measures one minute. These glasses are turned when there is a division; one of the four-minute glasses is turned and the bells will ring throughout the building. All of the almost 2600 clocks in the building will flash green for a vote in the House and red for a vote in the senate while ringing for four minutes to give all members throughout the building time to get to the chamber. After the hourglass stops, the House's attendants will lock the doors and the whips will count the votes. Members vote by either moving to the government side of the house for a vote for a bill or the opposition side for a vote against a bill. If there are successive divisions, and there is no debate after the first division, the middle one-minute hourglasses are turned and the bells are rung for one minute.

As is the custom with Westminster parliaments, members of the governing party sit to the Speaker's right, and the Opposition sits to the Speaker's left. Independents and minor parties sit between them. The long benches (the front benches) closest to the despatch boxes are reserved for the Cabinet on the government's side and the Shadow Cabinet on the Opposition's side. Uniquely amongst other national Westminster system parliaments, the prime minister and opposition leader (or most senior present government and opposition member respectively) sit separately at the central table, facing each other. (Note: The Australian Capital Territory Legislative Assembly also follows this arrangement.) The main table was a gift from the Canadian House of Commons and the Hansard table, a gift from the State of South Australia.

=== Senate ===
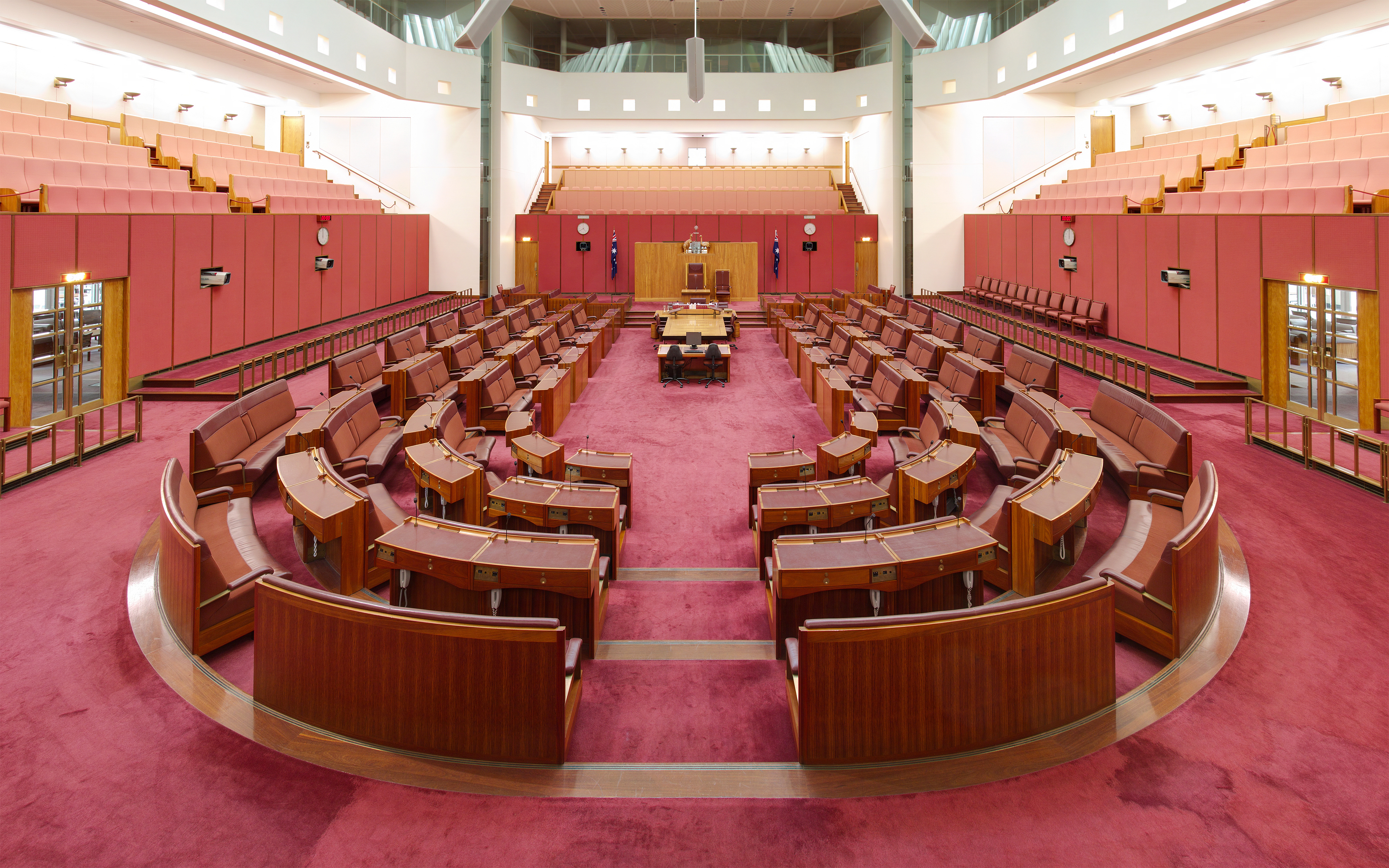
The Senate chamber

The Senate chamber matches the colour scheme of the House of Lords, decorated in red, but muted to tints of ochre, suggesting the earth and the colours of the outback.

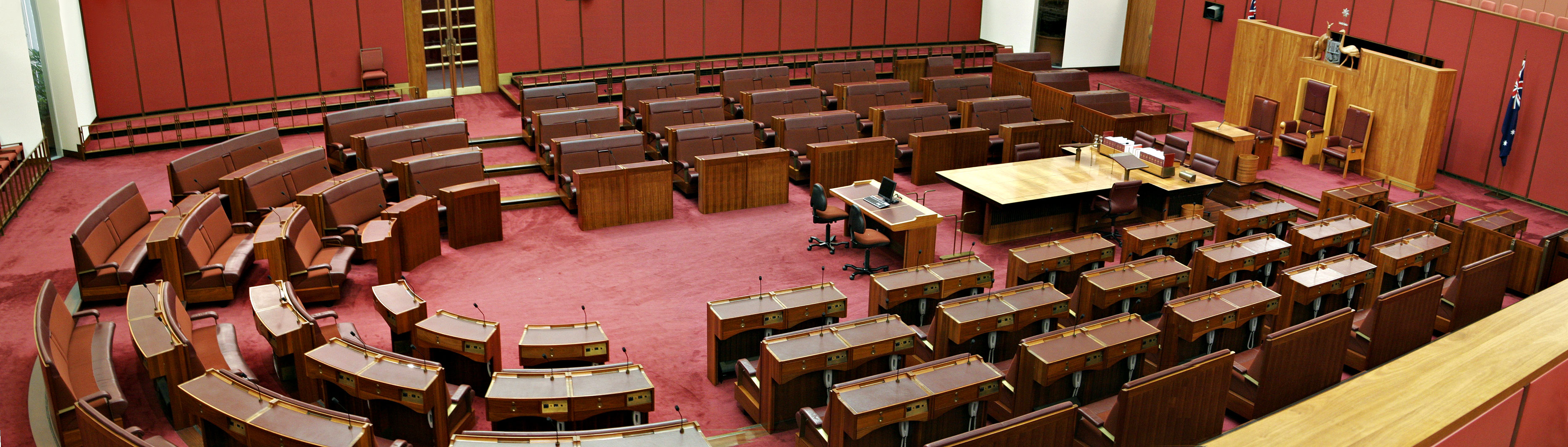
The Australian Senate

There currently 76 senators, however the chamber was designed to accommodate 120 senators. The gallery arrangement is almost identical to that of the House of Representatives. Unlike the House of Representatives, only the leader of the government or opposition in the Senate approaches the lectern; other frontbench senators and all backbench senators have a desk microphone. As can be seen from the illustrations, unlike the House of Representatives, there is no distinction between the front and back benches in the Senate chamber; Senate ministers and their opposition counterparts have the same two-seat benches as all other senators. The press gallery is located above the Senate chamber. The presiding officer of the Australian Senate is the president of the Senate, who occupies a position in the Senate chamber similar to that of the Speaker of the House of Representatives. Behind the seat of the President of the Senate (a gift of the Canadian Senate) are two large seats which are used during the opening of parliament. The larger is the vice-regal chair (a gift from the UK Parliament), used by the governor-general during the opening of Parliament, with the smaller (a gift of the NZ Parliament) used by distinguished guests, such as foreign leaders. (Note: In Old Parliament House, equivalent chairs were also used by Queen Elizabeth II and Prince Philip on the three occasions they opened Parliament in place of the governor-general.)

The Parliament House Art Collection of over 6,000 works includes commissioned (and purchased) portraits of every prime minister, governor-general, president of the senate and speaker of the house, as well as other works of art significant to Australia.

=== Executive wing ===
Unlike many other governments that follow the Westminster system, the cabinet room, the Prime Minister's Office, ministerial offices and other core functions of the executive of the federal level of government (the Australian Government) are housed in the same building as the Parliament. This is because of a shortage of other buildings in the then sparsely populated Canberra when Parliament moved from Melbourne to Old Parliament House in 1927. The Executive Wing is located opposite the main entrance, with the Cabinet directly in line with the War Memorial such that it can be viewed if all the doors of Parliament House are opened.

=== Basement ===
Beneath Parliament House there is a web of basements and offices. Originally a bomb shelter was included in the design of the House, but it was not built due to cost reasons. It was intended that a large room in the basement would be converted into a bomb shelter, but this has not been built either.

== Reception ==
New Parliament House has been warmly received for its beauty and democratic symbolism, particularly the grass-covered roof that allows visitor access. Member for Fenner, Andrew Leigh has praised the way "the building was constructed to emerge out of Capitol Hill – rather than sitting atop it as an imposing structure". The new Parliament House is recognised as being more spacious and light-filled than its predecessor, and much less cramped.

The building has received criticism for the way in which its design discourages collegiality amongst members. New Parliament House was designed in the late 1970s, in the context of the Sydney Hilton Hotel bombing and the tense political climate following the Dismissal of the Whitlam government, and thus one of the key elements of the design brief was providing security for the executive. The winning design's solution was to fence off the executive in its own ministerial wing. In practice, this meant it was no longer possible for backbenchers to bump into ministers while passing through the corridors of parliament, increasing a sense of detachment between the two groups. The heart of Old Parliament House was King's Hall, an entrance hall open to the public that connected the House of Representatives and the Senate to the parliamentary library and the refreshment rooms. Inevitably, due to its central location, Kings Hall became a bustling hub where people met and talked, and a place where politicians could mingle with the public and the press gallery. In contrast, the new building situates the library and refreshment rooms at great distance from the two chambers, and Member's Hall, the foyer that connects the House and the Senate, is not open to the public. As a consequence, Member's Hall lies empty, as parliamentarians have no reason to be there.

Similarly, while in the Old Parliament House members of various political parties would inhabit offices that shared the same corridors, New Parliament House segregates opposing parties in different corners of the building, decreasing interaction between members. Members would often only meet their opponents in the adversarial environment of the debating chamber, and many former parliamentarians believe this has heightened the sectarian nature of parliamentary politics in Australia.

Don Watson, speech-writer for former Prime Minister Paul Keating, writes:

The place lacks red blood cells. Beyond the chambers there is no sign of the great contest of ideas for which a national parliament exists. Unlike the old Parliament House where opponents bumped past each other in the corridors, met each other's eyes, exchanged brutalities in the bar, stood side by side at urinals, in the new building the Opposition is separated from the Government by a divide as great as any which separates all of them from their constituents. As with dogs which meet only through a fence and cannot sniff each other's backsides, it deepens the everyday animus.

Paul Keating has lamented walking the corridors of New Parliament House "not feeling like you were part of anything". Another former prime minister, Malcolm Turnbull, expressed concern the "badly designed" structure lacks "collision space [that] brings people together to ... compromise and agree and discuss. I think the design of the building definitely contributes to the fact that there are less cross-party friendships than there were in the old parliament". These concerns have been echoed by many former parliamentarians, including Malcolm Fraser, Tom Uren, Peter Walsh, Barry Jones, and Bob Carr. Walsh, a former finance minister in the Hawke government has said the building is "an antiseptic, isolated and impersonal place, compared with its predecessor".

== Function events ==
The new Parliament House is a central hub for events in Canberra, hosting many of the nation's largest and most important function events. The Parliament House is a place for meetings, conferences (government, and private), celebrations, and other miscellaneous uses. The Parliament House is one of the few parliament houses in the world where private events are permitted. The Parliament House has 14 event spaces that can be used for special events.

== Later developments ==
=== Solar power project ===
In 2011, the Department of Parliamentary Services commissioned a pilot 43.3 kW photovoltaic system on the roof of Parliament House in Canberra. The system is split between two locations, with 192 panels installed on the Senate wing with the remaining 42 panels on the roof of the Gardeners' Compound. At the time of construction, the system was one of the largest installed for solar power in Australia.

According to the Department of Parliamentary Services, the system was switched on in June 2011 and has performed as expected by providing enough power for lighting in both the House of Representatives and the Senate. This equates to an approximate saving of $9,000 which is expected to rise to $17,000 annually.

The system received an award from the Clean Energy Council in 2012 for "Best design and installation of a grid-connect power system greater than 10 kW".

=== Engineering heritage award ===
Both the old and new Parliament House received an Engineering Heritage National Marker from Engineers Australia as part of its Engineering Heritage Recognition Program.

=== Criminal acts ===
There have been repeated allegations and confirmations of criminal acts committed in the Australian Parliament house; these included the 2021 Australian Parliament House sexual misconduct allegations involving Brittany Higgins, Bruce Lehrmann and Christian Porter. In 1996 a small group broke away from a rally at the front of Parliament House and forced its way through the entrance doors (known as the 1996 Parliament House riot) and in 1992, a vehicle was driven through the glass front doors into the Great Hall.

== See also ==
- Centre Block, meeting place of Canada's federal parliament
- Parliament House, Wellington, meeting place of New Zealand's national parliament
- United States Capitol, meeting place of the United States of America's federal legislature
- Palace of Westminster, meeting place of the United Kingdom's parliament
- Reichstag building, meeting place of Germany's federal parliament
- National Diet Building, meeting place of Japan's national legislature
