= Albert Hall, Canberra =

Entertainment venue

Coordinates: 35.297623°S 149.125135°E

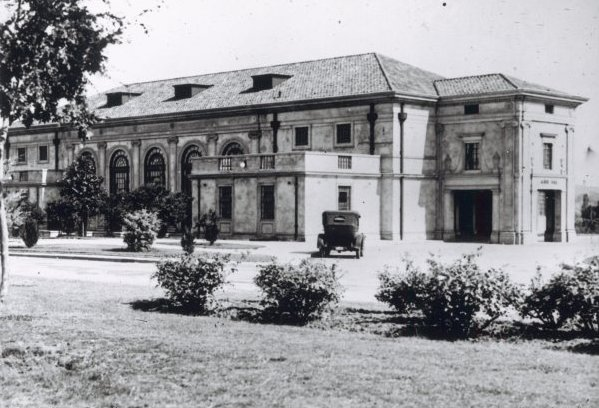
The Albert Hall photographed by WJ Mildenhall about 1928

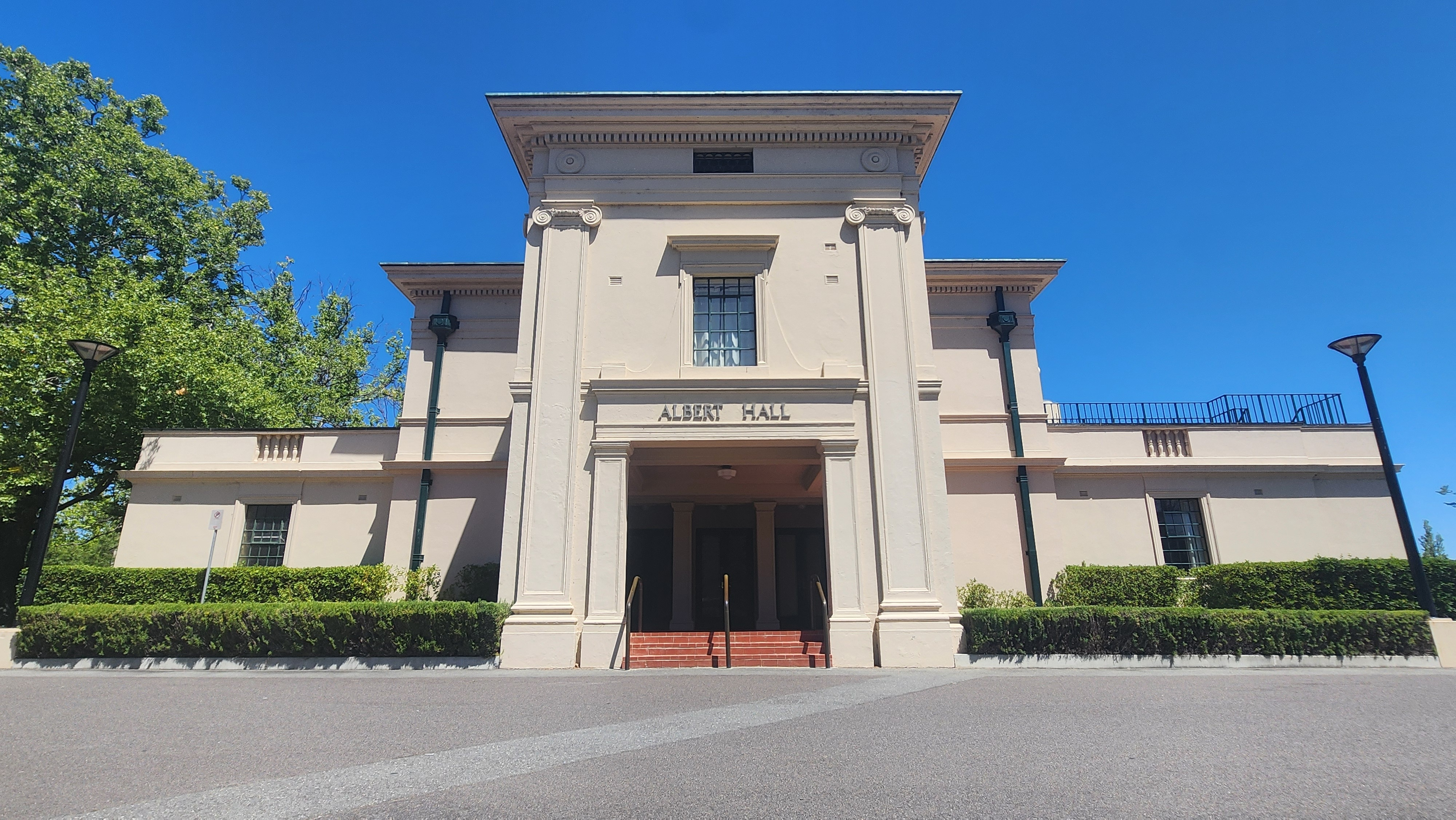
Front view of the Albert Hall

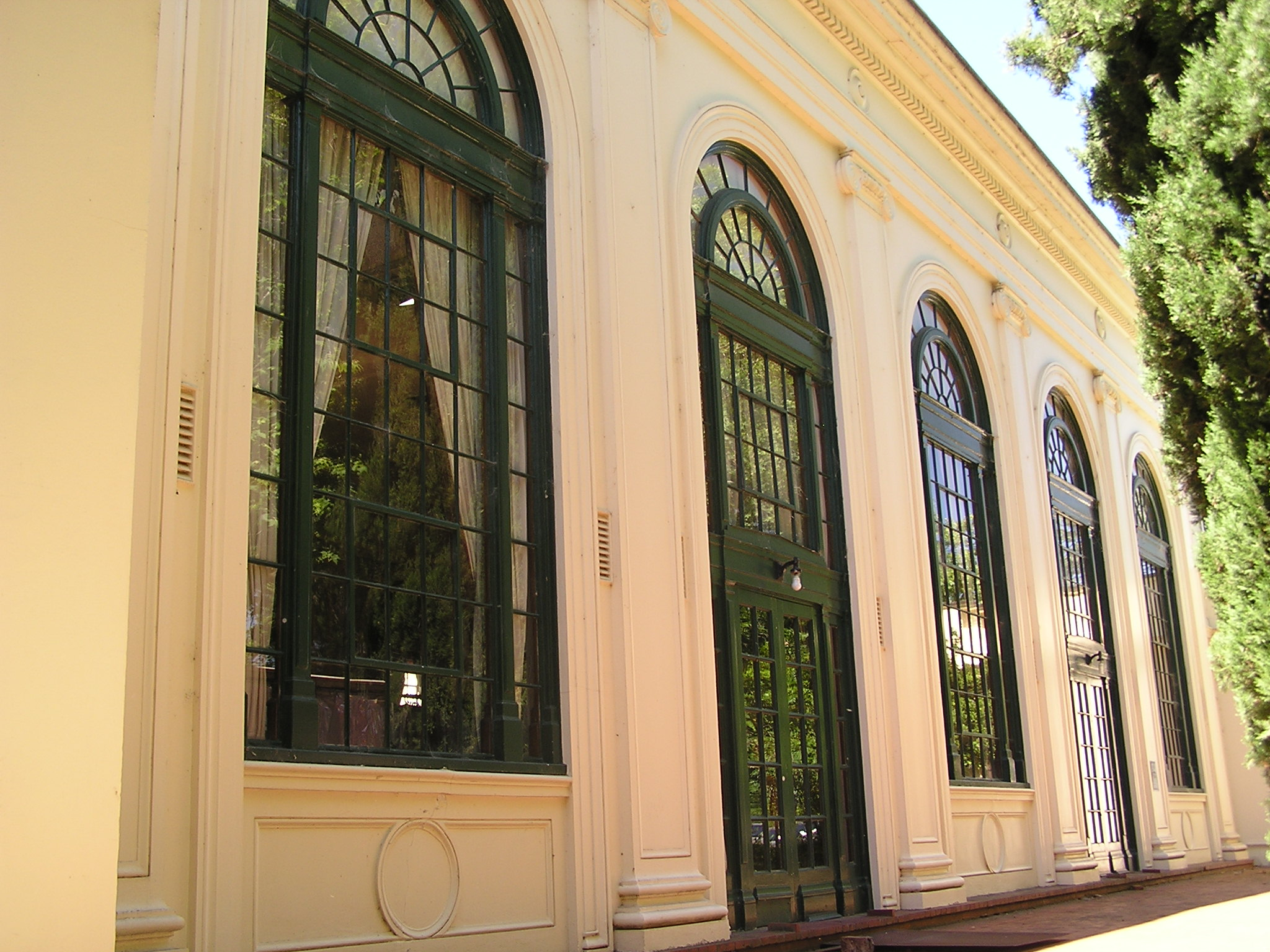
Windows on the south face of the building

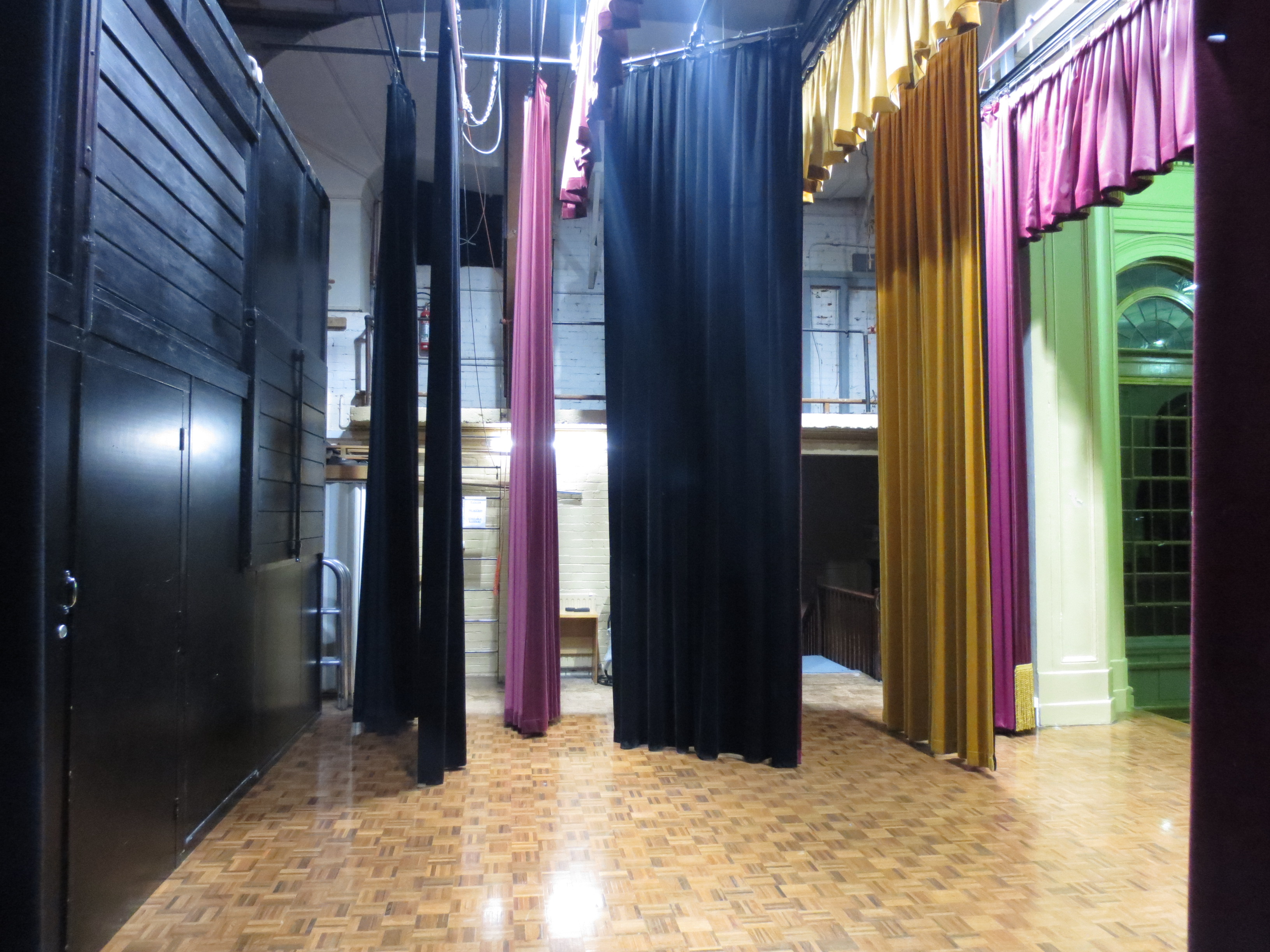
Albert Hall stage looking stage left showing theatre curtains (2016)

The Albert Hall is a hall in Canberra, Australia, used for entertainment. It is on Commonwealth Avenue between Commonwealth Bridge and the Hotel Canberra in the suburb of Yarralumla.

== Overview ==
The hall was opened on 10 March 1928 by the Prime Minister, Stanley Bruce. Bruce named the hall, explaining at the opening ceremony that he had chosen the name from the Royal Albert Hall in London and also because it was the first name of The Duke of York (later George VI) and furthermore that it commemorated the "Consort of the Queen who had proclaimed the Australian Commonwealth".

The hall was originally designed by the Federal Capital Commission architect David Limburg, under Chief Architect Henry Rolland, then amended before construction. It is in the Federal Classical style. A porte-cochere at the front allows for passengers from vehicles to alight undercover.

The Hall comfortably seats around 400 people in open-spaced rows of seats.

Albert Hall’s east end has a Foyer with three sets of doors from the porte-cochere and a further three sets leading to the Hall. On the south side is the original ticket booth and toilets for men and women. On the northern side is a small entertaining room with kitchen and servery; the main Hall’s chairs are stacked here when not in use. The floor above has on the east side a small suite of offices for meetings, and on the side facing into the Hall is a mezzanine with raked fixed seating for about 50 people, accessed by stairs from the Foyer. Over the small entertaining room is a flat roofed outdoor area that may be used for entertaining by users of the offices.

Behind the stage on the west end are two suites of preparation rooms for performers, one on either side. There is no interconnection, or passage around the stage area.

The hall was not heated in its early years, and patrons had to bring rugs, thick coats and water bottles. Singers were known to perform in fur coats until heating was finally installed after World War II.

On 27 January 1949, the Albert Hall hosted the inaugural meeting of the Canberra branch of the Liberal Party of Australia.

Prior to its construction, the largest hall in the Federal Capital Territory was at the Causeway in Kingston. Until the completion of the Canberra Theatre in 1965, the Albert Hall was the only place in Canberra for audiences of more than 700 people other than the cinemas.

The Albert Hall remains the 'city hall' for Australia's national capital, used for civic, cultural and community functions and with some commercial use. It is heavily booked on weekends and during the week for private events, dances, balls, performances, cultural activities and commercial sales.

== Heritage and development controversy ==
On 22 February 2007, the National Capital Authority (NCA) released National Capital Draft Amendment 53 - Albert Hall Precinct. This amendment to the development plans for the city was intended to reinstate some of the plans that were originally made by Walter Burley Griffin when he designed the city in 1912, which had been neglected in the years following Griffin's departure from Canberra, when the Albert Hall was constructed. The plan intended to reinforce the geometry, landscape and purpose of the area surrounding the Albert Hall, including Commonwealth Avenue in front of the hall, and the open space facing Lake Burley Griffin at its rear. In particular, the amendment suggested that the land around the Albert Hall would be opened up for commercial purposes such as cafes and tourist facilities. The amendment also made reference to a 'landmark building' north of Albert Hall, which would presumably house these facilities.

There was a lot of discussion about the plans outlined in the amendment. An action group formed to oppose the plan, under the emotive catch-cry of "Save Albert Hall". Ongoing public debate and anger directed towards the authorities involved led to the National Capital Authority holding public meetings on 5 March, and later added more meetings on 22 and 24 March. Finally, at a meeting on 2 April 2007, it was agreed that the NCA would not proceed with the landmark building, and that the land would be used as a "public lakeside park". The organisation continues to campaign to protect the Albert Hall and its precinct. The building, which was previously listed only on the Heritage Places register, has been suggested for inclusion on the National Heritage List, which would make it extremely difficult for government authorities to make further attempts to develop the precinct. In the lead-up to the 2007 federal election, the Labor Senator Kate Lundy committed $500,000 to the restoration of the Albert Hall.

=== Compton Theatre Organ ===
A Compton Theatre Organ was installed in Albert Hall in the late 1980s, after the ACT Division of the Theatre Organ Society of Australia took delivery of its components and spent almost ten years restoring the organ. Its inaugural concert was on 17 August 1986, with organist Tony Fenelon. This organ had originally been, from March 1933 until 1968, in the Gaumont Palace (later renamed the Odeon Theatre) in Cheltenham, Gloucestershire, UK.
