= Adelaide Avenue =

Freeway in Canberra, Australia

Adelaide Avenue Australian Capital Territory

General information
- Type: Freeway
- Length: 2.0 km (1.2 mi)
- Gazetted: 20 September 1928
- Maintained by: Transport Canberra & City Services
- Former route number: ACT Tourist Drive 5

Major junctions
- East end: Capital Circle; Capital Hill, Australian Capital Territory
- West end: Yarra Glen; Deakin, Australian Capital Territory

Location(s)
- Major suburbs / towns: Deakin / Yarralumla, Canberra

Highway system
- Highways in Australia; National Highway • Freeways in Australia; Road infrastructure in Canberra

Adelaide Avenue is a limited-access road in Canberra, Australian Capital Territory.

The road connects Yarralumla with the Parliament House area. Adelaide Avenue is a popular tourist route, since Parliament house, The Lodge, the residence of the Australian Prime Minister, and the Royal Australian Mint, can be seen from it. It continues as Yarra Glen to link to the district of Woden.

The far right lane was used as a bus lane until December 2006, but due to the Gungahlin Drive Extension it was changed to a T2 transit lane. The T2 lane was reverted to a bus lane on 14 November 2011 after the completion of the Gungahlin Drive Extension. However a week after the lane was turned back to a bus lane the ACT Liberals and the ACT Greens overturned the decision, resulting in the lane changing to a T2 lane despite the wishes of the Labor party and the Transport Workers Union.

== See also ==
- Freeways in Australia
- Freeways in Canberra
