= Capital Hill, Australian Capital Territory =

City center and the location of Parliament House, Canberra, Australia

Capital Hill
- Suburb
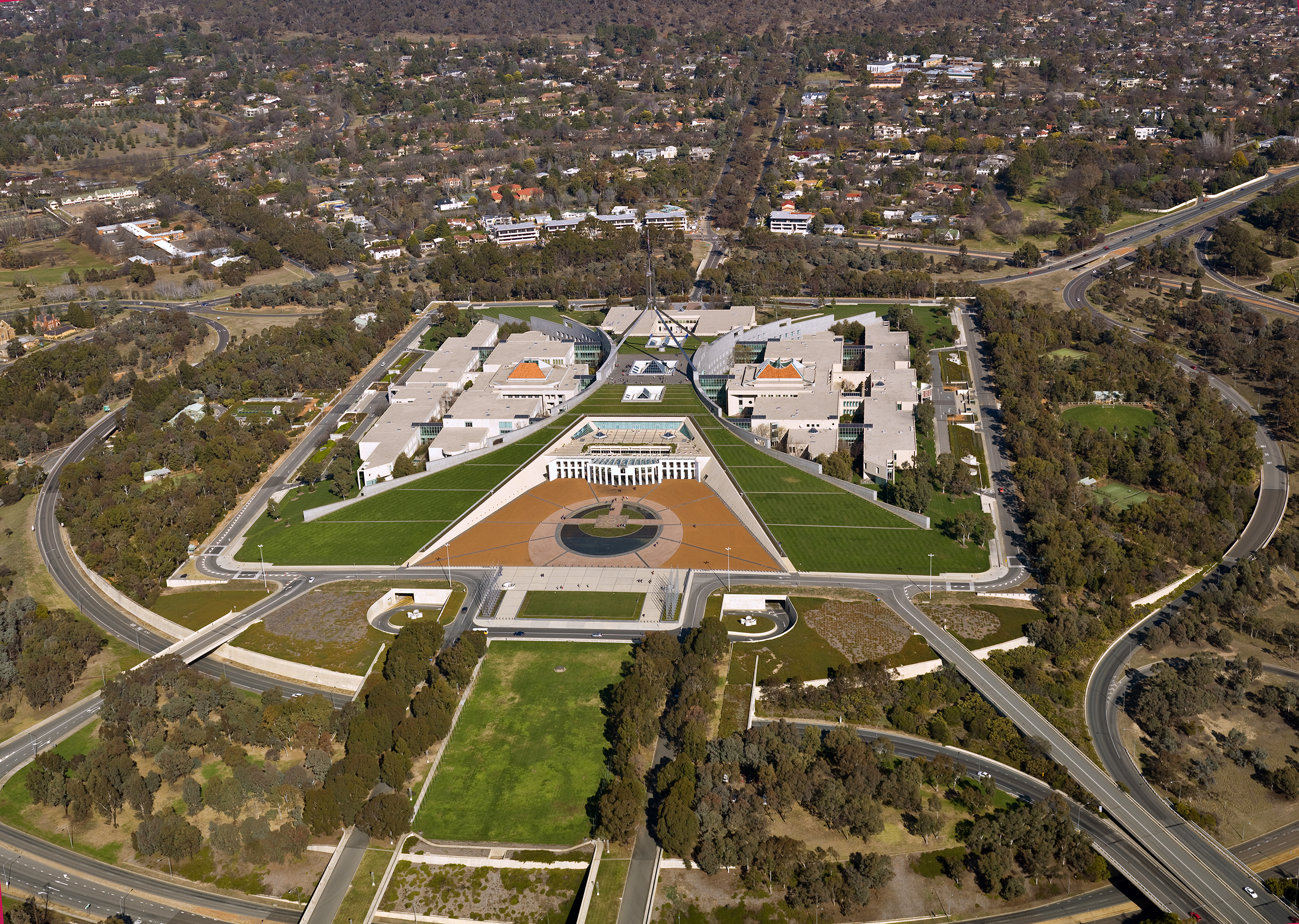
- South-west view of Capital Hill and the suburbs around it, 2011

- Coordinates: 35°18′29″S 149°07′28″E
- Country: Australia
- State: Australian Capital Territory
- City: Canberra
- District: South Canberra
- Location: 4 km (2.5 mi) S of Canberra CBD; 12 km (7.5 mi) W of Queanbeyan; 96 km (60 mi) SW of Goulburn; 293 km (182 mi) SW of Sydney

Government
  - Territory electorate: Kurrajong
  - Federal division: Canberra
- Elevation: 604 m (1,982 ft)

Population
  - Total: 3 (SAL 2021)
- Postcode: 2600
Suburbs around Capital Hill
Yarralumla	Yarralumla	Parkes
Yarralumla	Capital Hill	Barton
Deakin	Forrest	Forrest

Capital Hill (postcode: 2600) is the location of Parliament House, Canberra, at the south apex of the land axis of the Parliamentary Triangle.

== History and design ==
The site was selected as the location of the Capitol in Walter Burley Griffin's Canberra design in 1912, which he envisaged to be "either a general administration structure for popular receptions and ceremony or for housing archives and commemorating Australian Achievements". The proposed building is commemorated in the name of the Capitol Theatre, Manuka. However, Griffin's name for the hill was subsequently changed to Capital Hill.

The Parliament buildings were to be located a little further down the hill towards Lake Burley Griffin at Camp Hill, between Capital Hill and the Provisional Parliament House. Griffin opposed the plan to build a Provisional Parliament House on the lower slopes of Camp Hill, because he considered that it would make it difficult to build the permanent Parliament House on Camp Hill, as the provisional building would have to be demolished.

In fact, in the 1958 and 1964 Holford plans for the Parliamentary Triangle, the site for the New Parliament House was moved to the lake shore, partly for this reason. Holford also reportedly said that a lakeside site would discourage politicians from seeing themselves as superior to ordinary people.

However, in 1974 Parliament voted to move the Parliament to its permanent location on Capital Hill, which it saw as befitting the eminence of the institution. Construction of the new parliament buildings commenced in 1981 and the new building was officially opened by Queen Elizabeth II in 1988, when the Parliament relocated from the old building.

Capital Hill was previously named Kurrajong Hill and is around 2.5 km^{2}, surrounded by a circular road (Capital Circle). Until the construction of the current Parliament House, the hill was covered with scrubby native bushland.

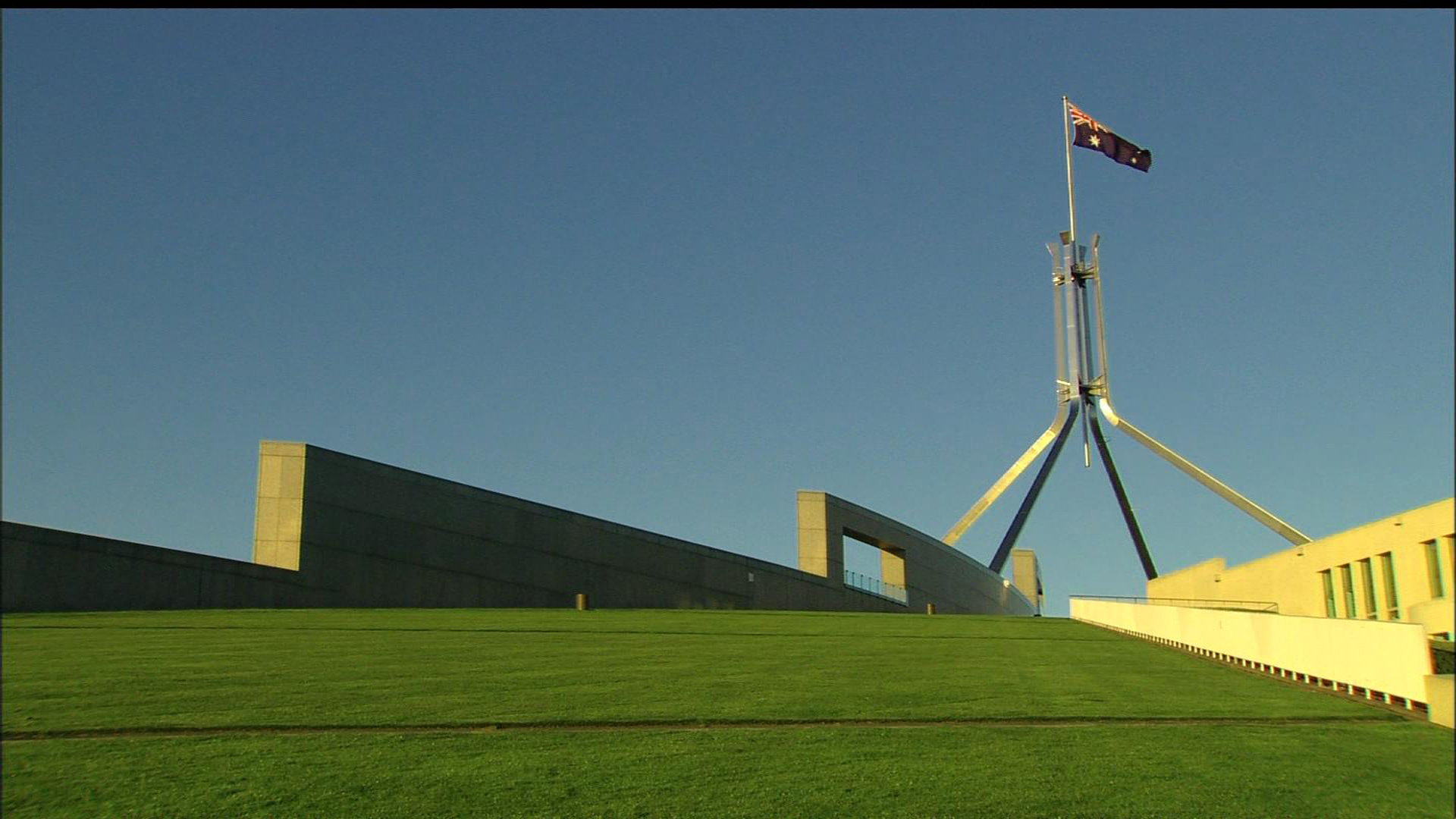
Parliament House Canberra: the hill recreated over the building

The construction of the current parliament building required removing much of the top half of the hill, and after construction, much of the earth was replaced on top of the building. The surrounding hill is landscaped with native plants, while the soil on top of Parliament House is planted with lawn. However, on the western side of the Hill, a small area of the original native bushland has been preserved.

A 1911 map utilising surveying by Charles Scrivener states the peak was 2005 feet.

The streets that go out from Capital Hill are named after Australian capitals, and some of their direction roughly corresponds to the direction of that capital city, Melbourne Avenue, Adelaide Avenue, Perth Avenue, Hobart Avenue and Darwin Avenue with Brisbane Avenue, Sydney Avenue not even being close. The streets which surround the hill in concentric circles are named after increasing spheres of influence with the inner-most circle called Parliament drive and then spanning out to Capital Circle, State Circle, National Circuit, Dominion Circuit and Empire Circuit.

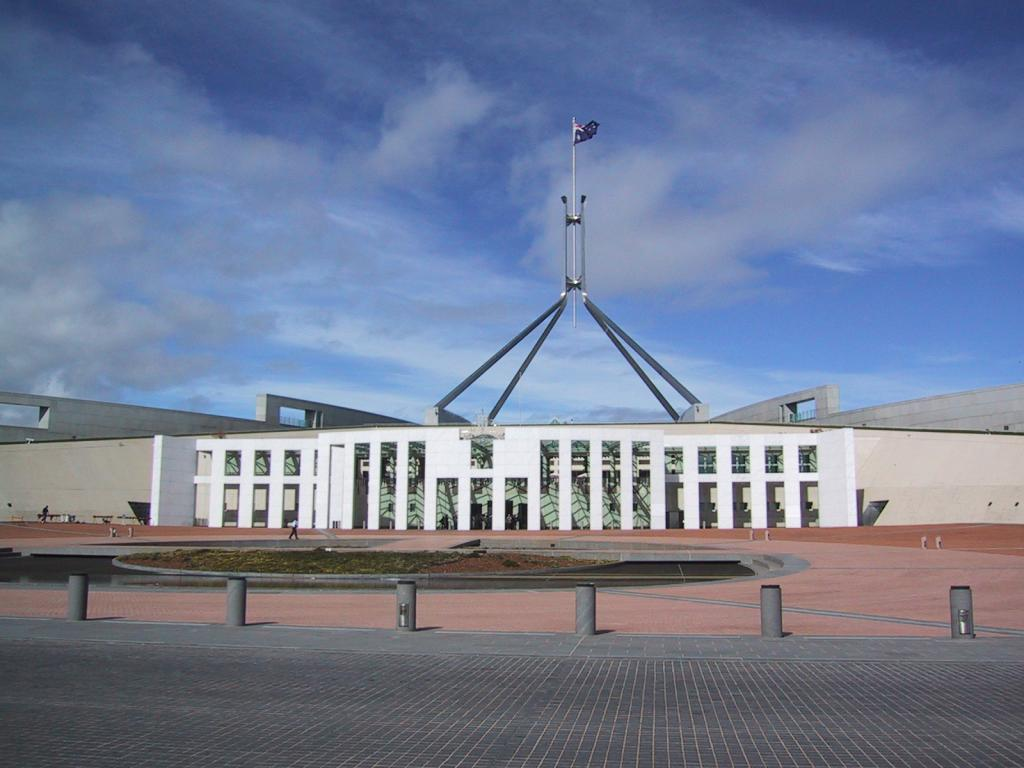
Parliament House Canberra: The main entrance and the flag

When Griffin drew up his plans in 1912, there was still some optimism that New Zealand might join the Federation of Australia. Griffin's plans included eight avenues radiating out from Capital Hill named after the capitals of the six states, the capital of the Northern Territory and the capital of New Zealand.

Before the name Wellington Avenue was gazetted, it was realised that New Zealand was not going to become part of a Confederation of Australasia and the name was replaced by Canberra Avenue. Griffin planned that the state capital city avenues were terminated with a park named after the generic botanical name for a native plant from that particular site; for example, Telopea Park is named after the waratah, the floral emblem of New South Wales, and is at the end of Sydney Avenue, named after the capital of New South Wales.

The name of the precinct of Manuka is a remnant of Griffin's naming scheme. Another remnant of Griffin's nomenclature was the Wellington Hotel, formerly on the corner of Canberra Avenue and National Circuit, which was demolished and replaced by the hotel known as of 2007 as Rydges Capital Hill Canberra.

== Geology ==
The geology of Capital Hill has been studied in great detail. Canberra Formation, calcareous Shale is found in the south west and north east. This overlies middle Silurian Camp Hill Sandstone. The sandstone unconformably overlies the early Silurian Black Mountain Sandstone and State Circle Shale. State Circle Shale is Late Llandovery in a more finely divided time scale and has been dated to 445.7 million years old. The State Circle Shale is composed of laminated shales and siltstone. Black Mountain Sandstone is composed of a white quartz sandstone. The Deakin Fault cuts the south west of state circle. Mount Painter acid volcanoes are to the south west of this fault.

== See also ==
- Capital Circle
