= Spinnaker Island (Lake Burley Griffin) =

Island in Canberra, Australia

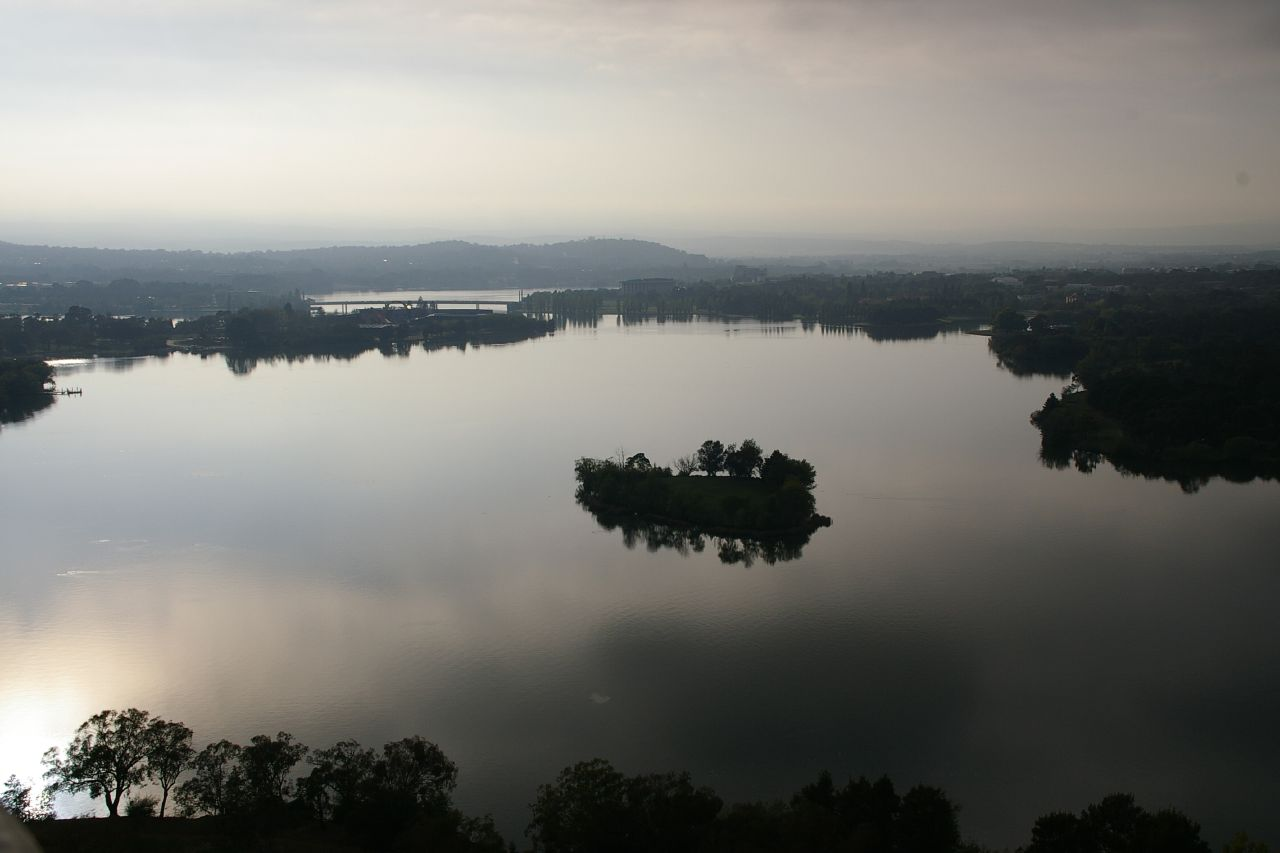
- Spinnaker Island, 2007
- Interactive map of Spinnaker Island

Geography
- Location: Lake Burley Griffin, Canberra (Map)
- Coordinates: 35°17′39″S 149°6′21″E
- Total islands: 1

Administration
- Australia

Spinnaker Island, within Lake Burley Griffin, is located in Canberra, Australian Capital Territory, Australia. In total there are six islands in the lake, but only three are named. The island is roughly 200 m (660 ft) long and 75 m (246 ft) wide. It was given the name Spinnaker Island to reflect recreational sailing in the lake's West Basin and the island's form altering the prevailing winds.

Spinnaker Island and Springbank Island are both located in the West Basin of the lake. The West Basin extends from the Commonwealth Avenue Bridge to Black Mountain Peninsula.

In 2010, invasive exotic vegetation were found on the island, requiring a controlled burn-off for their removal and to reduce the presence of weeds.

The island is the site of a silver gull breeding colony. As a species more commonly found on the coast, the colony which was estimated at 385 nests in 2016, is of interest to researchers to understand the migration patterns of these gulls.

== See also ==
- List of islands of Australia
