= Commonwealth Park =

Park in Canberra, Australia

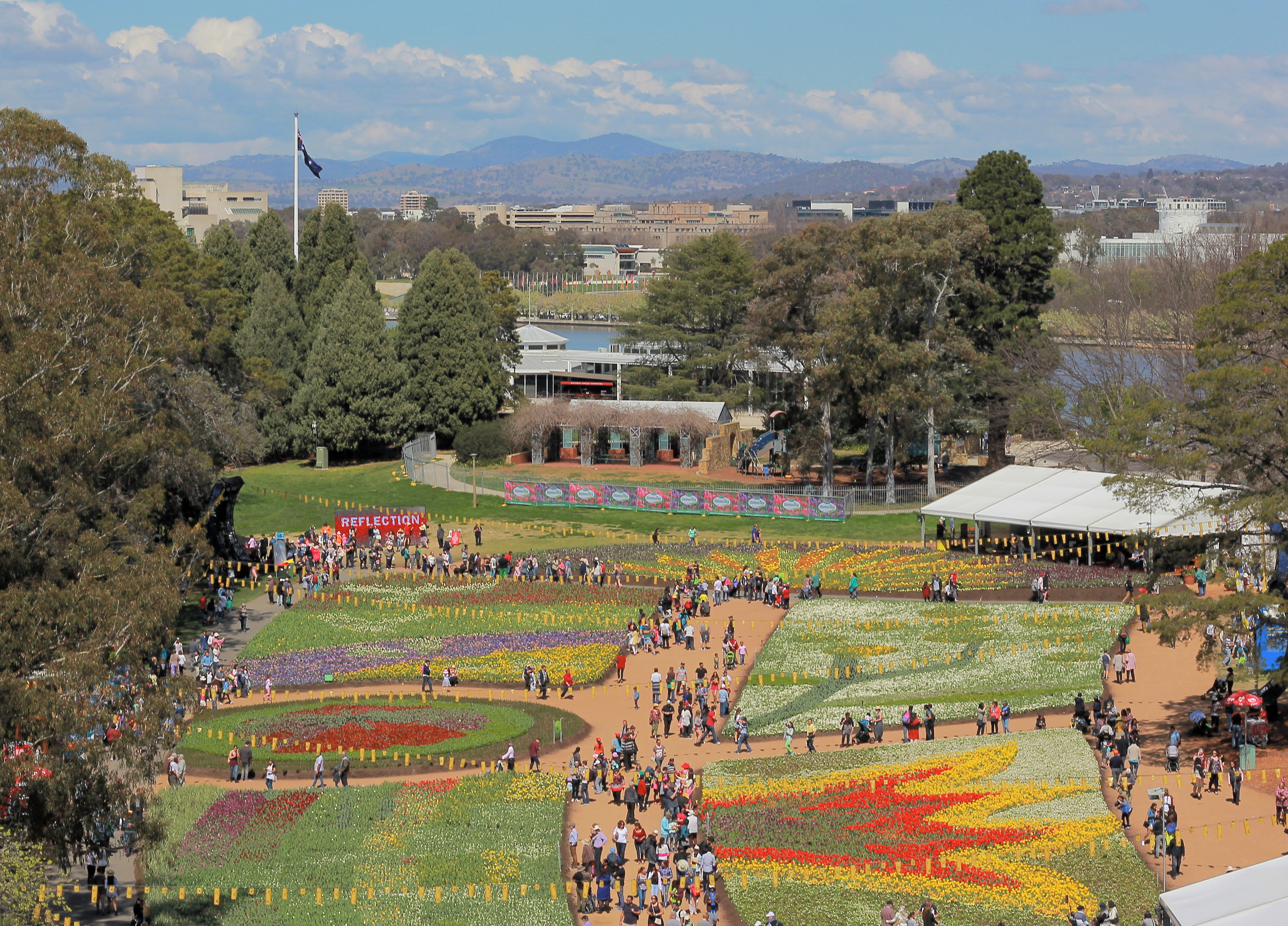
- 2012 Floriade in Commonwealth Park
- Interactive map of Commonwealth Park
- Location: Commonwealth Avenue, Parkes, Canberra
- Coordinates: 35°17′18″S 149°8′3″E
- Area: 34.25 ha (84.6 acres)
- Established: 1964
- Opened: 1965
- Designer: Sylvia Crowe
- Owner: Australian Government
- Manager: National Capital Authority
- Operator: Floriade (September–October)
- Open: 365 days
- Water: Nerang Pool
- Parking: Car park on site
- Facilities: Stage 88, Cafe, Restaurant, Exhibition Centre, Gardens, Toilets, Playground
- Website: https://www.nca.gov.au/attractions/commonwealth-park

Commonwealth Park is in Canberra, Australia, adjacent to the north side of Lake Burley Griffin. Centrally located in the city, it is an important part of the urban landscape. The park has an area of 34.25 hectares, which includes a variety of natural and constructed spaces.

Various designers have been involved in the construction of the park including Charles Weston, Lindsay Pryor, Richard Clough and John Grey. The park in it current form was strongly influenced by a master plan created by British landscape designer, Dame Sylvia Crowe in 1964.

The park has many small ponds and water features, walking trails, bike paths, sculptures and memorials. Located within the park is the outdoor Stage 88, which often holds concerts. The park includes Regatta Point and has a view of the National Gallery, High Court, and National Library on the other side of the lake. Kings Park is located adjacent to Commonwealth Park, along the lake to the east.

Commonwealth Park is the home of many events hosted in Canberra. Among them is Floriade, an annual event that has been running since 1988.

== History ==
In 1874, Ebenezer Booth built himself a house on the glebe of St John the Baptist Church, within the present boundaries of the park, to the east of what is now Nerang Pool. Murray's store, considered the area's first retail store, operated from the house. It burnt down in 1923. A number of stunted pines and English elms remain on the spot.

In his original plan for the city, Walter Griffin included a recreation area to the north of the man-made lake. His final plan of 1918 included an "aquarium pond", now Nerang Pool. Modifications from Griffin's plan of 1911 came about following his visit to the site and to reduce the amount of earthworks needed. The recreation area in the earlier plan was more formal and included many public buildings.

== Works of art ==
Title	Artist	Date	Description
Play sculpture	David Tolley	Commissioned 1967, installed 1970	Collection of 4 white sculptures each of which comprises two structures, located near the Children's Fort playground. The sculptures are constructed from precast concrete and finished with fibreglass. The sculpture were designed to feel organic and inviting for people to play/sit on. The sculptures were part of a larger 7-piece sculpture that was originally designed to be displayed together. Another similar version of this artwork can be found in Weston Park.
Untitled (also known as Earthworks)	Hubert 'Bert' Flugelman	Installed 1975	Six polished aluminium tetrahedrons, buried permanently within Commonwealth Park in a secret location. The approximate location is noted with a plaque, close to Nerang Pool. It was added to the park during the Australia 75 Festival of Creative Arts and Sciences. Sculptures 75 was a part of this festival, and was held entirely within Commonwealth Park.
Two figures	Dame Barbara Hepworth	Acquired 1969, installed 1976, relocated in 2023 to the National Exhibition Centre	Free standing bronze and enamel sculpture. Numbered 4/7
Untitled (also known as Underpass Mural)	Sue Birch-Marston	Completed 1977	Painted mural on concrete walls. Organised by the Arts Council of Australia ACT Division as a community arts project. The mural was painted during the Sunday in the Park sessions that used to occur in Commonwealth Park. The mural was designed using children's designs, which were incorporated into the large design.
Untitled (also known as Amphitheatre Mural)	Anne Morris	Installed 1977	Original mural was contributed to by students of the Canberra School of Art, in conjunction with Sunday in the Park activities. The mural was created using enamel glass paint on a concrete wall. The second mural was installed in 1982, and depicted "events in Australian history, Aborigines, Australian personalities and the environment". This artwork was installed by the mural art group "Paintings on Walls", organised by Anne Morris The mural was replaced again in 1987, led again by Anne Morris, but this time focusing on the activities of Amnesty International. The art work was contributed to by members of Amnesty and art students, with the design being worked on by the Ginnidera Group of Amnesty International.
Kangaroos	Jan Brown	Commissioned in 1979, installed 1981	
Dance of the Secateurs	Bruce Radke	1988	
Resting Place of the Dragon Fly	Mary Kayser	Exhibited 1989, permanently located 2011	Constructed out of painted steel, this sculpture won the 1989 Floriade Sculpture Project. It was exhibited in the floral festival, and acquired by the Queen Beatrix Sculpture Collection. In 2011, it went through a major refurbishment, and was then relocated next to Nerang Pool in Commonwealth Park.
Zugzwang	Philip Spelman	1990	
Seated Lady	Herman Johaus	1990's	
Untitled	Alan Gauir	1991	A metal flock of birds which was one of the prize winning entries in the 1991 Floriade Sculpture competition.
Walter Burley Griffin Terrazzo	David Humphries	Commissioned and installed 2000	The Walter Burley Griffin Terrazzo is set in the pavement outside the entrance of the National Capital Exhibition, and is a mosaic of Walter Burley Griffin's 1912 prize-winning design, set out as a page torn from a book.The Terrazzo was a part of the 2000 redevelopment of the National Capital Exhibition, with the tiles being created in Melbourne and then carefully put together on site.
Sir Robert Menzies	Peter Collete	Commissioned and installed 2012	Bronze sculpture of Sir Robert Menzies. The sculpture was created over a 6-month period and is designed to be a 1.1 times life size. Menzies was an influential part of the development of Canberra during his second term as Prime Minister (1949-1966), and vital to the eventual construction of Lake Burley Griffin. The sculpture is located on RG Mezies Walk which runs along the northern side of Lake Burley Griffin.

== Memorials ==
Memorial name	Date of official opening or presentation	Description
Canadian Flagpole	20 November 1957	The flagpole was a gift to Australia from the Canadian Government and the Canadian timber industry. It was a single spar of Douglas Fir, 39 metres tall with three metres in the ground and 36 metres freestanding. When logged from a forest in British Columbia, it weighed 7.1 tonnes. The Canadian Flag was raised each year on Canada Day, 1 July. The flagpole was felled on 13 November 2020 due to safety concerns.
Captain Cook Memorial Water Jet and Globe	25 April 1970	The water jet and terrestrial globe were constructed to commemorate the bicentenary of Captain James Cook’s landing on the east coast of Australia in 1770. Queen Elizabeth II opened the Memorial and activated the fountain after arriving at the park on a barge from Government House. The Captain Cook Memorial Globe is an open-cage globe formed by the meridians of longitude and parallels of latitude, with land depicted in beaten bas-relief copper. Traced on the globe are the routes of Cook’s three voyages of exploration, with explanations of his ports of call inscribed on the surrounding handrail. The jet can operate at a height of 147 metres. The Memorial Globe and Jet were both designed by the architectural firm Bunning and Madden, which also designed the National Library and Parkes Place, located across the lake. Construction of the monument was undertaken by SABEMO.
Memorial to pioneer women	2 September 1972	A large seat with views across the lake close to the site of the demolished bakery and store. It was designed by Margaret Hendry, a National Capital Development Commission (NCDC) landscape architect, in response to approaches in 1971 to the NCDC by the National Council of Women. The memorial was unveiled by Lady Hasluck, wife of the then Governor-General.
Sybil Howy Irving Memorial	1979	A timber arbor planted with wisteria, to commemorate a Colonel Irving's lifetime (1897—1973) of dedicated service to Girl Guides Association, Victorian Society For Crippled Children And Adults, Red Cross Society, Australian Women's Army Service, Women's Royal Australian Army Corps, Council On The Ageing. Irving was the founder and controller of the Australian Women`s Army Service.
Lord Stanley Melbourne Bruce Memorial		A bronze plaque mounted on concrete set in the eastern part of the park near the Spectator Shore, that commemorates the spreading of Prime Minister Stanley Melbourne Bruce's ashes in Lake Burley Griffin after he died in London in 1967.
Citizenship Place Memorial	26 January 2009	A timeline of Australia’s citizenship story, the memorial commemorates the 60th anniversary of the first citizenship ceremony held in Canberra in 1949. The memorial was unveiled by the Governor-General Quentin Bryce on Australia Day 26 January 2009 in the presence of Prime Minister Kevin Rudd.
