= Springbank Island =

Island on Lake Burley Griffin in Canberra, Australia

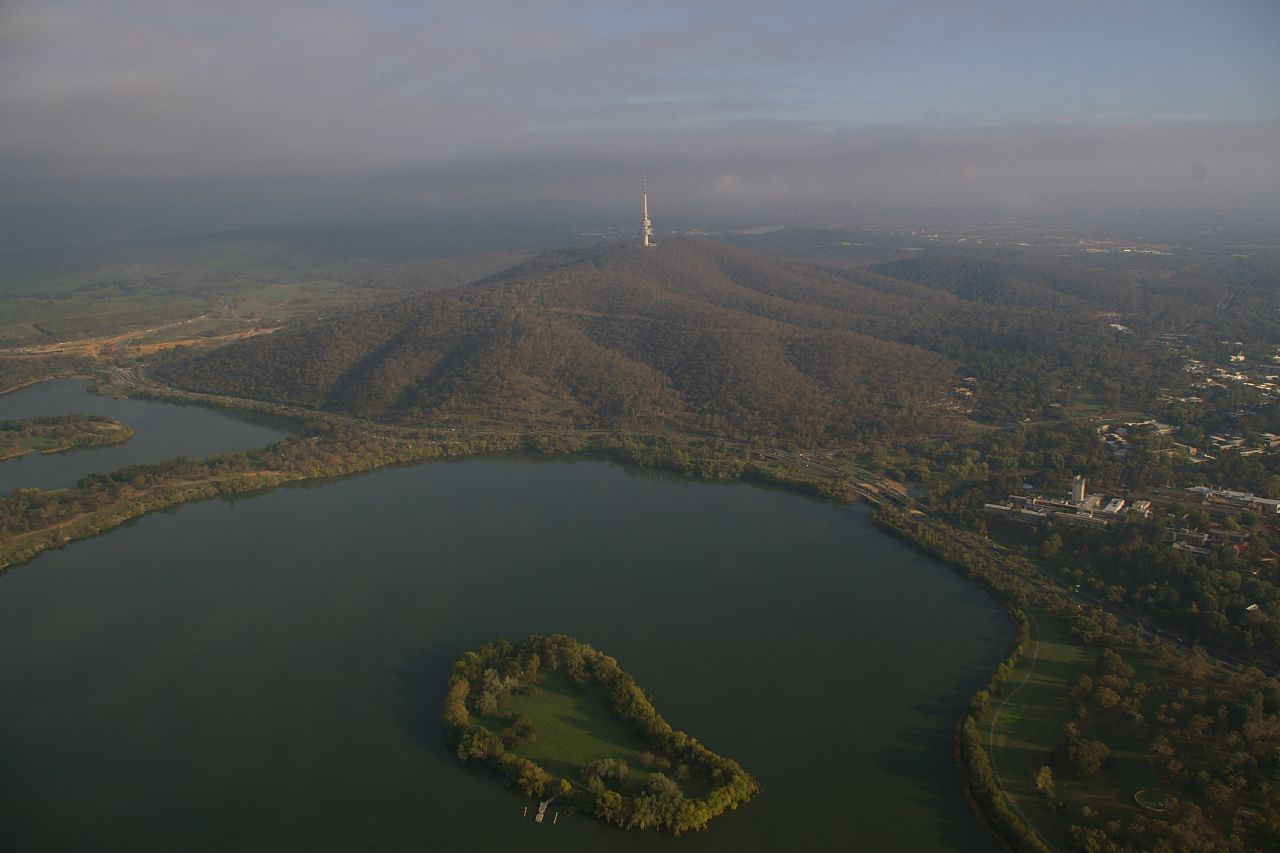
- Springbank Island in the foreground of Black Mountain, behind
- Interactive map of Springbank Island

Geography
- Location: Lake Burley Griffin, Canberra (Map)
- Coordinates: 35°17′25″S 149°6′39″E

Administration
- Australia
- Territory: Australian Capital Territory
- suburb: Acton

Springbank Island is an island located on Lake Burley Griffin in Canberra, Australian Capital Territory. Springbank Island is named after a former agricultural property that was partially submerged to create Lake Burley Griffin. An elevated part of the former property now comprises the island.

== Access and use ==
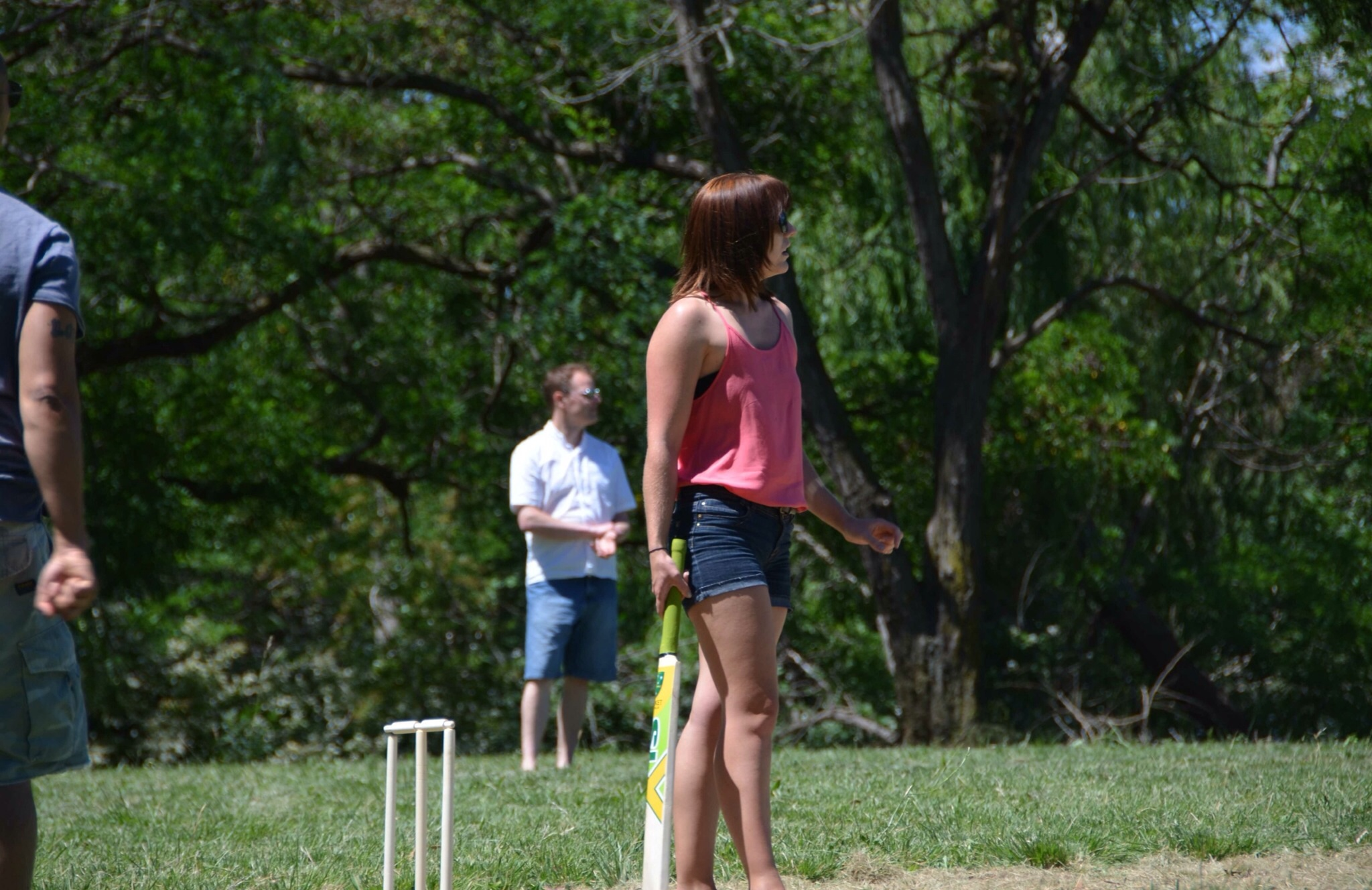
A batter watching her shot drop in the lake in the mixed division final at Canberra Beach Cricket 2013

Springbank Island is located in the West Basin of Lake Burley Griffin, adjacent to the suburb of Acton. It is only accessible by boat. While the perimeter of the island is lined with trees, the island itself is quite bare, other than the treed picnic area and shelter (at the western end of the island). The island is not irrigated, there is no power source, and overnight camping is prohibited. Barbecue facilities, tap water, picnic tables, and toilets are available. The National Capital Authority is responsible for oversight and management of the island. Springbank Island is the venue for Canberra Beach Cricket, a semi-annual beach cricket carnival.

== History of Springbank property ==
Springbank included both the river flats of the Molonglo River and Black Mountain plus a sizeable portion of the area now occupied by the Australian National University (ANU). In October 1831, John MacPherson was granted 640 acres (260 ha) of land. The homestead of the property was on the high ground that now forms Springbank Island.

The MacPherson family lived at Springbank; John MacPherson being the first resident landholder in Canberra, and his wife Helen and their children the first European family to live in what is now the Australian Capital Territory. One of their children, John Alexander MacPherson, grew up to become, briefly, the 7th Premier of Victoria. It has been suggested that he was probably the first European boy born on the Limestone Plains.

McPherson's grant was disputed by Joshua John Moore, a neighbouring landowner. Moore wrote to Robert Hoddle, the Government Surveyor: I beg leave to inform you that I am desirous of retaining the 1,000 acres (400 ha) already in my possession. It is called and known by the name Canburry. It was agreed that Moore retain the ridge and the name Canburry for his land, whilst the basin be shared with MacPherson.

The Macpherson family sold the property to the Kaye family in 1844. Joseph Kaye had migrated to Australia in 1832 and in 1838 arrived in Queanbeyan, where he ran the local pub for several years. In 1844 the family moved to Springbank, taking over the existing farm and buildings. The farm extended over a roughly rectangular area now bounded by University Avenue in the north, Clunies Ross Street to the west, the old Canberra High School (now the Canberra Institute of the Arts, within the ANU Acton campus) to the east and, to the south, the Molonglo River which formed part of the boundary with Corkhills' farm. The area included the old Canberra race track, the original Federal golf course (at Acton before moving to Red Hill) and a large part of the present ANU Acton campus.

The Kaye family moved in 1855 from the Springbank home to a house near the present Hotel Canberra. Apparently the family found the house unpleasant to live in because of the snakes in the swamps of the nearby Molonglo River which became a menace during times of flood.

Before it was purchased by the Sullivan family in 1888, the property served two years as a school under James Abernethy, and Mr Evans, a tutor at Duntroon, also occupied it for some time. The Sullivan family had lived in the area since the mid-1850s. Canberry Creek which ran through the property was renamed Sullivans Creek after William Sullivan (1829-1911). In 1913 the Sullivan family left the area after the government resumed their land in 1910.

In 1914, Sydney Stock and Station Agents Gair, Sloane and Co. gave a detailed valuation of the freehold land comprising Springbank':

- 115 acres (47 ha) were listed as arable flats
- 53 acres (21 ha) as dark soil
- 570 acres (230 ha) wheat land and
- the remaining 1,217 acres (493 ha), grazing land.

The property, including 1,955 acres (791 ha) of freehold land, the homestead buildings, yards, cow bails, piggery, buggy-shed, woolshed, yards and three dams, eleven hundred willow trees and an orchard, was valued at 'ten thousand and twenty two pounds, ten shillings and no pence'.

From 1913 until 1924 the farm was occupied by the Cox family. The Kaye family returned in 1924 until 1961: the family sold the farm assets once construction of Lake Burley Griffin began.

=== Geography of the original property ===
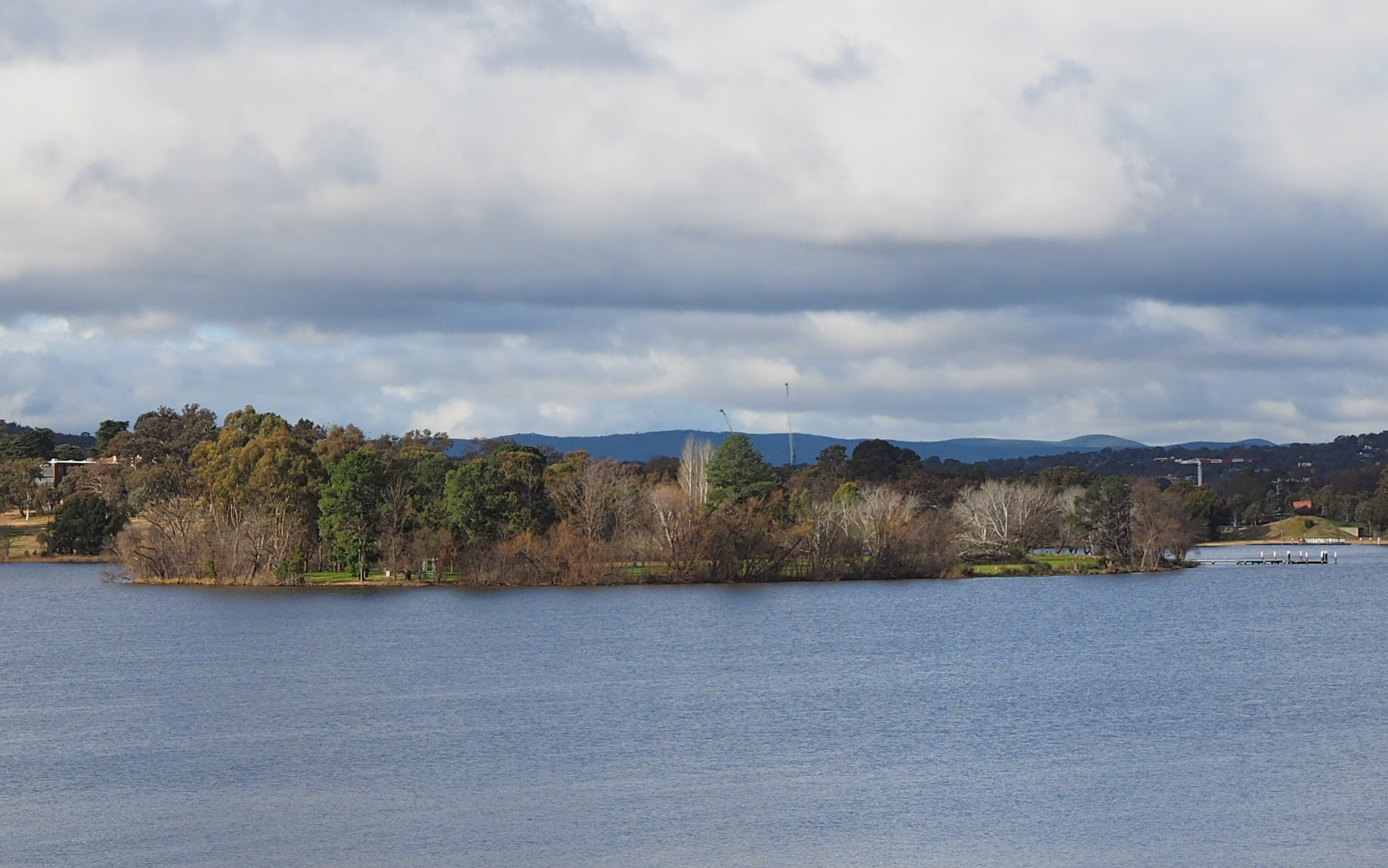
Springbank Island viewed from the Black Mountain Peninsula

The 115 acres (47 ha) of alluvial flats had a frontage to the Molonglo River to the south, Scott's Paddock on the West, the two huts, Woolshed and Pisa on the East and Black Mountain on the North.

SOIL: Is rich dark alluvial friable and fertile loam about 12 feet (3.7 m) deep, resting on a gravel bed, providing good draining – liable to be inundated by the overflow water from the Molonglo River annually, leaving a rich deposit of alluvium, rendering it admirably suited for the growth of lucerne and corn and comparing favourably with a great deal of the Hunter River land. The roots of the lucerne penetrate down to the perennial water supply which percolates through the underlying porous bed from the River and from the Creek flowing through the centre of this area, providing natural irrigation in the dryest season – this creek has never been known to run dry.

The arable flats were valued then at 30 pounds per acre. The agents described the trees on Springbank as:

Chiefly Iron-bark, White gum, Box, Peppermint, a few cherry and oak trees. Ringbarked years ago and neglected as a natural consequence, is now a dense mass of undergrowth of young trees.

== See also ==
- List of islands of Australia
