= Immigration Bridge =

Proposed crossing of Lake Burley Griffin, Canberra

Coordinates: 35.3°S 149.12°E

The Immigration Bridge was a proposed footbridge in Canberra, the capital of Australia. It was proposed that it be built over Lake Burley Griffin between the National Museum of Australia and Lennox Gardens on the south shore of the lake's West Basin, in the centre of the city.

A not-for-profit organisation, Immigration Bridge Australia, promoted the bridge as a means of recognising the contributions immigrants have made to Australia, and sought AUD22 million in donations from the public and between AUD10 million and AUD15 million from the Australian Government for its construction. Initial concept plans for the bridge showed it as having a walkway 12 metres (39 feet) above the lake's surface, supported by twelve pylons. Immigration Bridge Australia claimed the original design was a "concept only" and a small number of pylons, or possibly none, was a possibility. The proposal had proven controversial; a Commonwealth Parliamentary inquiry into the bridge held during early 2009 received 20 submissions, most of which opposed the concept. The inquiry's final report recommended that the bridge be redesigned to take the needs of other lake users such as cyclists and sailors into account and that its site be moved if it were not possible to reach a compromise.

Some critics argued that including a bridge within West Basin was inconsistent with Walter Burley Griffin's vision for the lake despite a bridge to Acton Peninsula being clearly visible in the winning design for Canberra, albeit in a slightly different location to the concept design.

The Immigration Bridge was abandoned on 30 March 2010, having raised hundreds of thousands of dollars from the public, as a result of heritage and safety concerns. As of 2010, the proponents of the bridge were working on plans for a national immigration monument that would be located near the National Archives of Australia in the parliamentary triangle in Canberra, using the money already raised.
