= Black Mountain Peninsula =

Peninsula in Canberra, Australia

Coordinates: 35.29°S 149.1°E

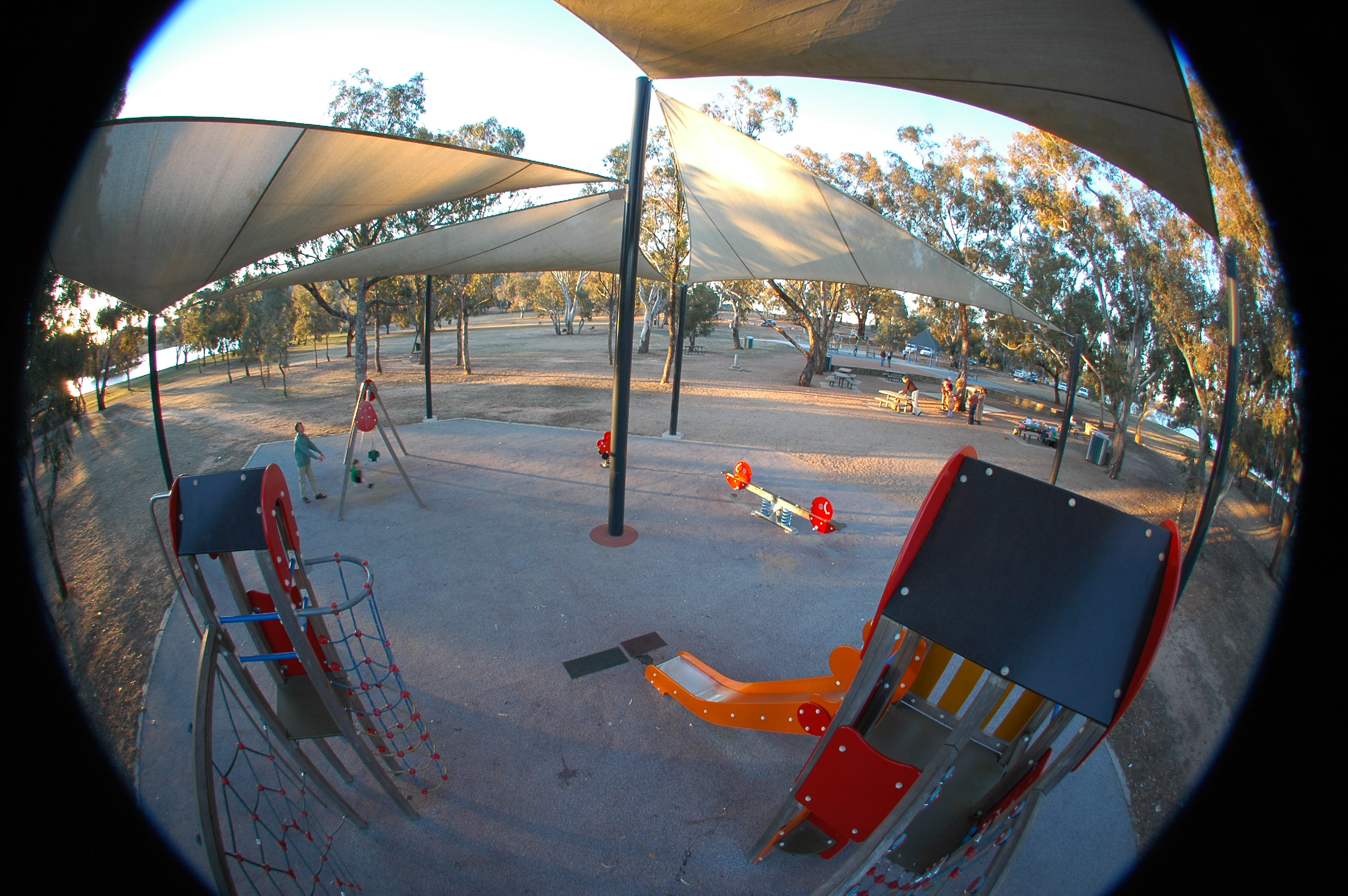
Black Mountain Peninsula playground

Black Mountain Peninsula, located in Acton, Australian Capital Territory, a suburb of the capital Canberra, is a prominent area on the western region of Lake Burley Griffin. It is popular for water recreation and picnics.
