= Captain James Cook Memorial =

Memorial in Canberra, Australia

Coordinates: 35°17′25.6″S 149°7′46.5″E

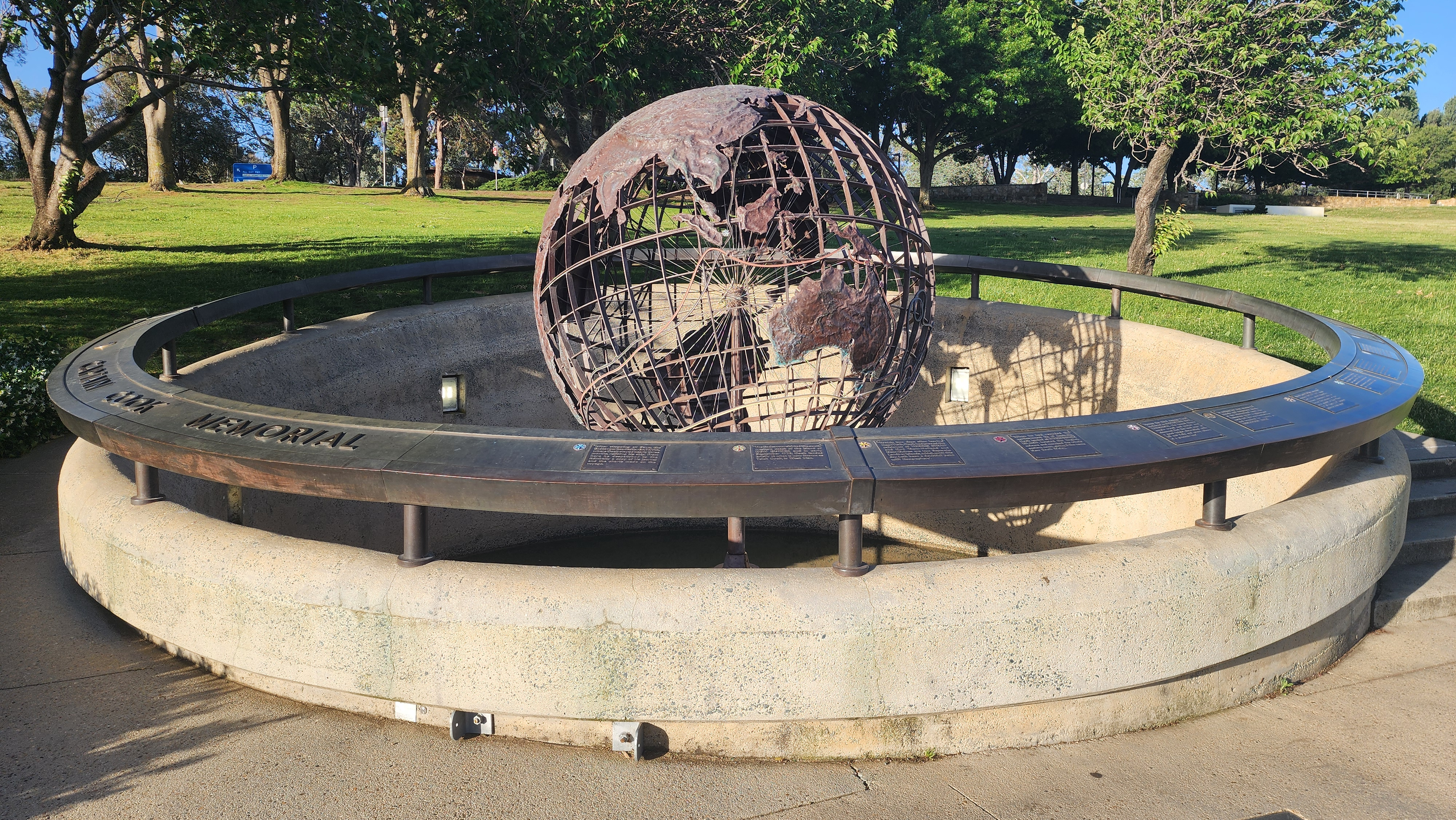
Captain Cook Memorial on Regatta Point

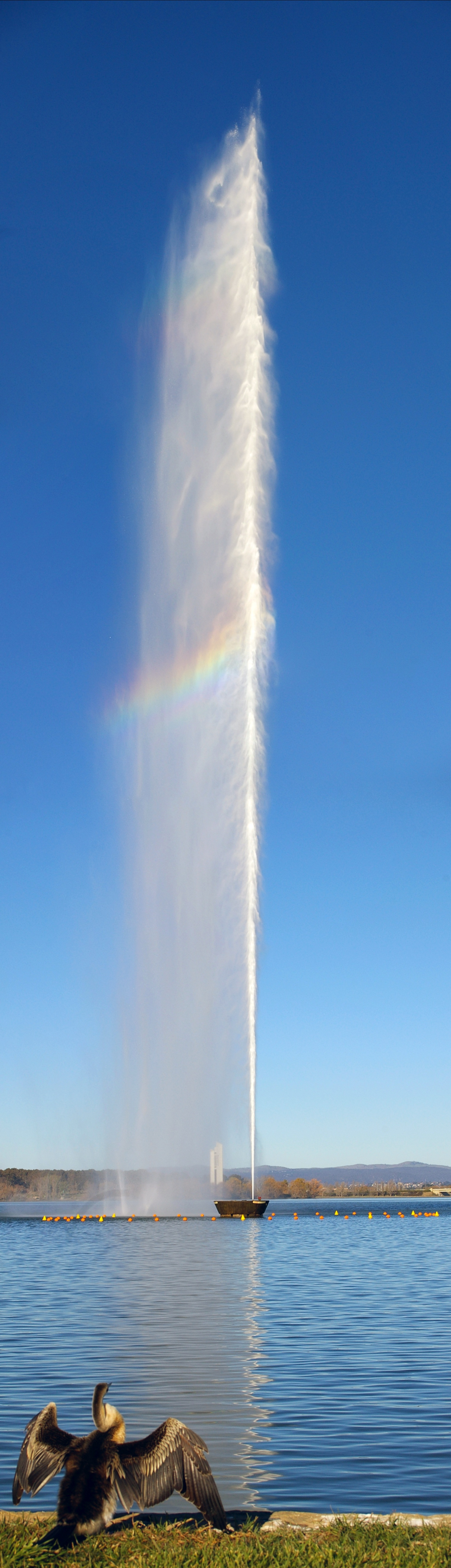
Captain James Cook Memorial water jet with the National Carillon in the background and a darter (Anhinga melanogaster) in the foreground

The Captain James Cook Memorial was built by the Government of Australia to commemorate the Bicentenary of Captain James Cook's first sighting of the east coast of Australia. The memorial includes a water jet located in the central basin and a skeleton globe sculpture at Regatta Point of Lake Burley Griffin in Canberra, showing the paths of Cook's expeditions. On 25 April 1970, Queen Elizabeth II officially inaugurated the memorial.

The water jet is driven by two 4-stage centrifugal pumps capable of pumping up to 250 litres per second against a head of 183 metres. The water velocity at the water nozzle is 260 km/h. While running both pumps simultaneously the main jet throws approximately six tons of water into the air at any instant, reaching a maximum height of 152 metres. Alternatively the jet can be run on a single pump reaching a lower height of 114 metres. During special occasions it can be illuminated, often with coloured lights. The design of the jet is based on the Jet d'Eau in Geneva, Switzerland as a result of high-level diplomatic negotiations.

The water jet operates daily from 11 am to 2 pm. In periods of high wind, the jet is automatically disabled as water landing on the nearby Commonwealth Avenue Bridge can be a hazard to traffic. The water jet must also be occasionally shut down when drought lowers the water level of the lake.
