= Sullivans Creek shared path =

Cycleway in Canberra, Australia

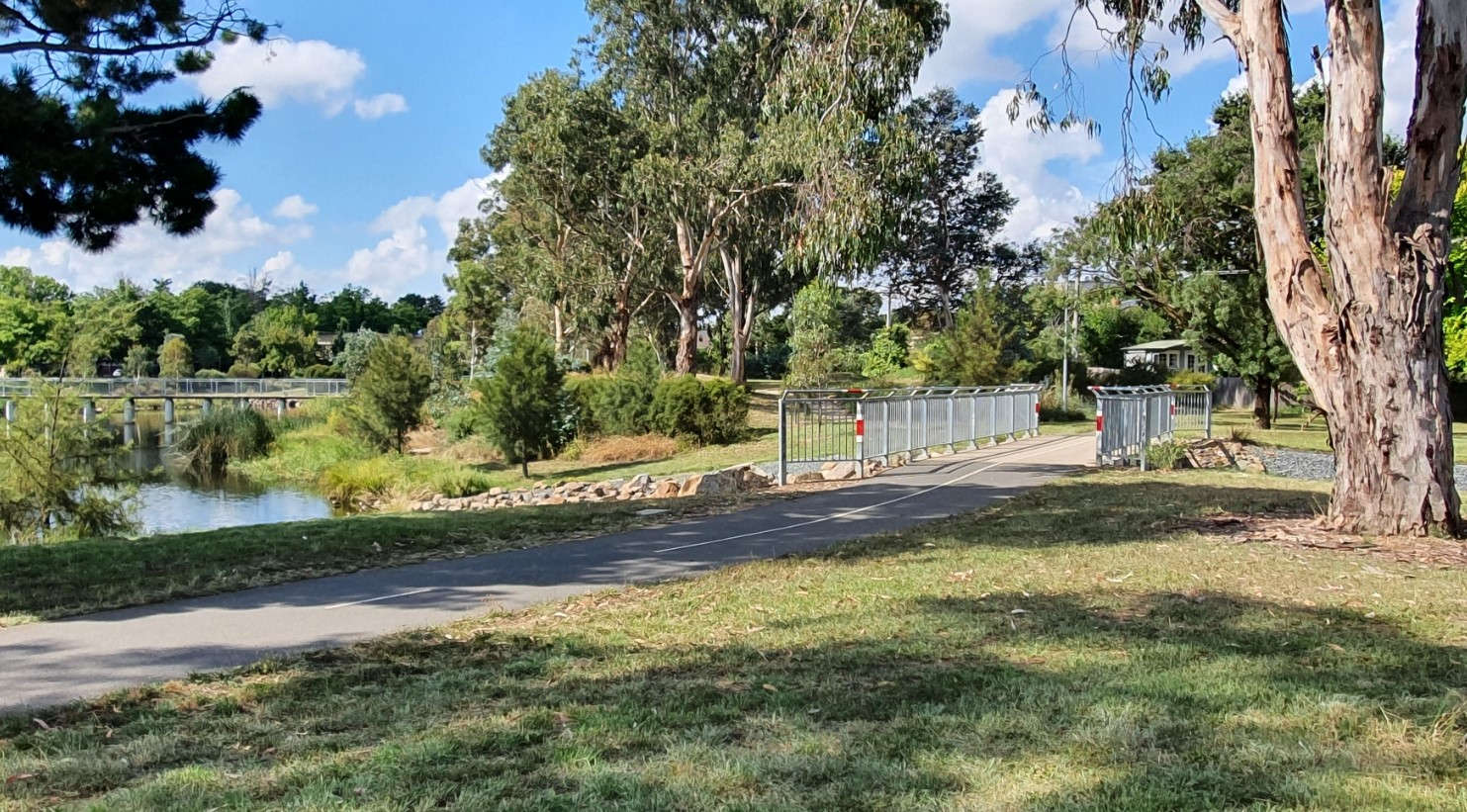
- The shared path passing through the Lyneham wetlands
- Length: 3.7 kilometres (2.3 mi)
- Location: Canberra, Australian Capital Territory, Australia
- Established: 1973
- Designation: C1, C3, C6
- Trailheads: Dickson Place, Dickson (north) to; Barry Drive, Turner (south)
- Use: Cycling, Pedestrians
- Difficulty: Easy
- Season: All seasons
- Surface: Asphalt

The Sullivans Creek shared path is a 3.7 km (2.3 mi) commuter cycleway in Canberra, Australia. Opened in December 1973, the path was the first off-street cycleway in Canberra and forms a trunk route from which the network extends to the districts of North Canberra, Belconnen and Gungahlin. Transport Canberra's designated cycling routes C1, C3 and C6 all traverse sections of the path, which is by far the busiest cycle route in the city.

== History ==
Although relatively small numbers of Canberrans commuted by bicycle in the 1970s, the National Capital Development Commission (NCDC) noted the benefits of cycling in terms of health and the potential to reduce road traffic. The alignment following Sullivans Creek was identified as the most suitable site for a pilot in May 1973. Construction was completed in November of the same year at an estimated cost of $100,000.

The path was officially opened in December by Minister for Urban and Regional Development Tom Uren, with the ceremony followed by a race between media personalities from CTC TV, radio station 2CA and The Canberra Times, after which the Minister and the Commissioner of the National Capital Development Commission rode along the path accompanied by 100 local children.

In 1974 advocates for better cycling infrastructure in the city staged a mass ride of over 50 bikes. The group were protesting the lack of alternative options that forced cyclists to ride on main roads, travelling along Belconnen Way and Macarthur Avenue, before continuing their journey to the city along the new path. The event received significant local media coverage and would ultimately lead to the formation of advocacy group Pedal Power ACT. The success of the Sullivans Creek path and the advocacy of the protestors led to an announcement by the NCDC in 1976 that 100 km (62 mi) of similar off-street paths would be constructed to create a metropolitan cycling network.

During 2016, the path between Wattle Street and Barry Drive was widened to 4 m (13 ft) to reduce congestion and increase travel speeds by allowing adequate space for both cyclists and pedestrians to share the path. These works also included raising several road crossings, placing them on top of speed humps to slow approaching vehicle traffic.

In November 2017 a "bike barometer" was installed at the Macarthur Avenue intersection in the suburb of O'Connor. This device uses an induction loop ground sensor to count bicycle traffic on the shared path. In its first full year of operation, the barometer recorded up to 2000 daily and an annual total of 469,382 cyclists using the Sullivans Creek path. The ACT Government collects the publicly available data to track the effectiveness of active travel initiatives and plays a role in planning future infrastructure.

== Description of route ==
At its northern end, the path begins near the corner of Dickson Place and Cowper Street in the Dickson group centre, marked as route C6. It follows the Dickson stormwater channel through parkland east to Northbourne Avenue. Here the path rises to street level and a pedestrian crossing controlled by several sets of traffic lights provide a safe crossing of both carriageways and the light rail tracks. From Northbourne Avenue, the route enters the Lyneham Wetlands, where it turns south across a bridge over the channel and continues through parkland to Wattle Street, where it is met by the C1 City to Gungahlin cycle route. South of Wattle Street, the route carries both the C1 and C6 designation for a short distance.

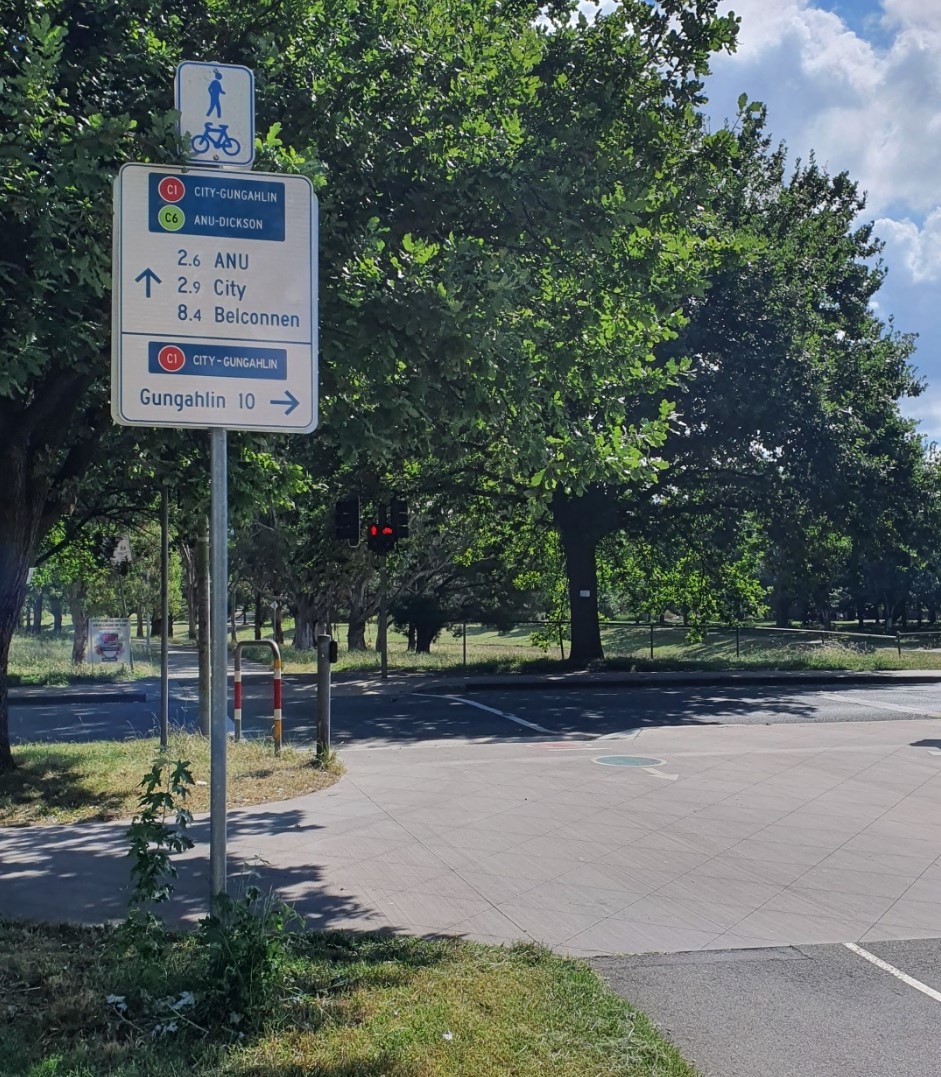
The Sullivans Creek shared path approaching Wattle Street, Lyneham from the north

Meeting Sullivans Creek, the path runs roughly parallel to the watercourse through Jandura Park to Macarthur Avenue. At this point, the C3 City to Belconnen cycle route joins the shared path. During peak times this area can become very busy as several pedestrian and cycle routes converge to cross a major thoroughfare, near the Macarthur Avenue light rail station and a school. A traffic light controlled crossing of Macarthur Avenue separates high volumes of bicycle, motor vehicle and pedestrian traffic.

Remaining east of Sullivans Creek, the shared path carries cycle routes C1, C3 and C6 concurrently between Macarthur Avenue and Condamine Street, Turner. Here the C6 route branches off to follow McCaughey Street to the Australian National University. The Sullivans Creek path continues as route C1 and C3, crossing Haig Park and Masson Street before entering the Turner Parklands and reaching its southern end at Barry Drive.

== Future Connections ==
The Haig Park Master Plan identifies a potential new east–west cycling trunk route, linking the inner suburb of Braddon with the Sullivans Creek path and improving connectivity to the Australian National University and Lyneham High School.

== See also ==
- Cycling in Canberra
