= Shakespeare by the Lakes =

Summer Shakespeare festival in Australian Capital Territory

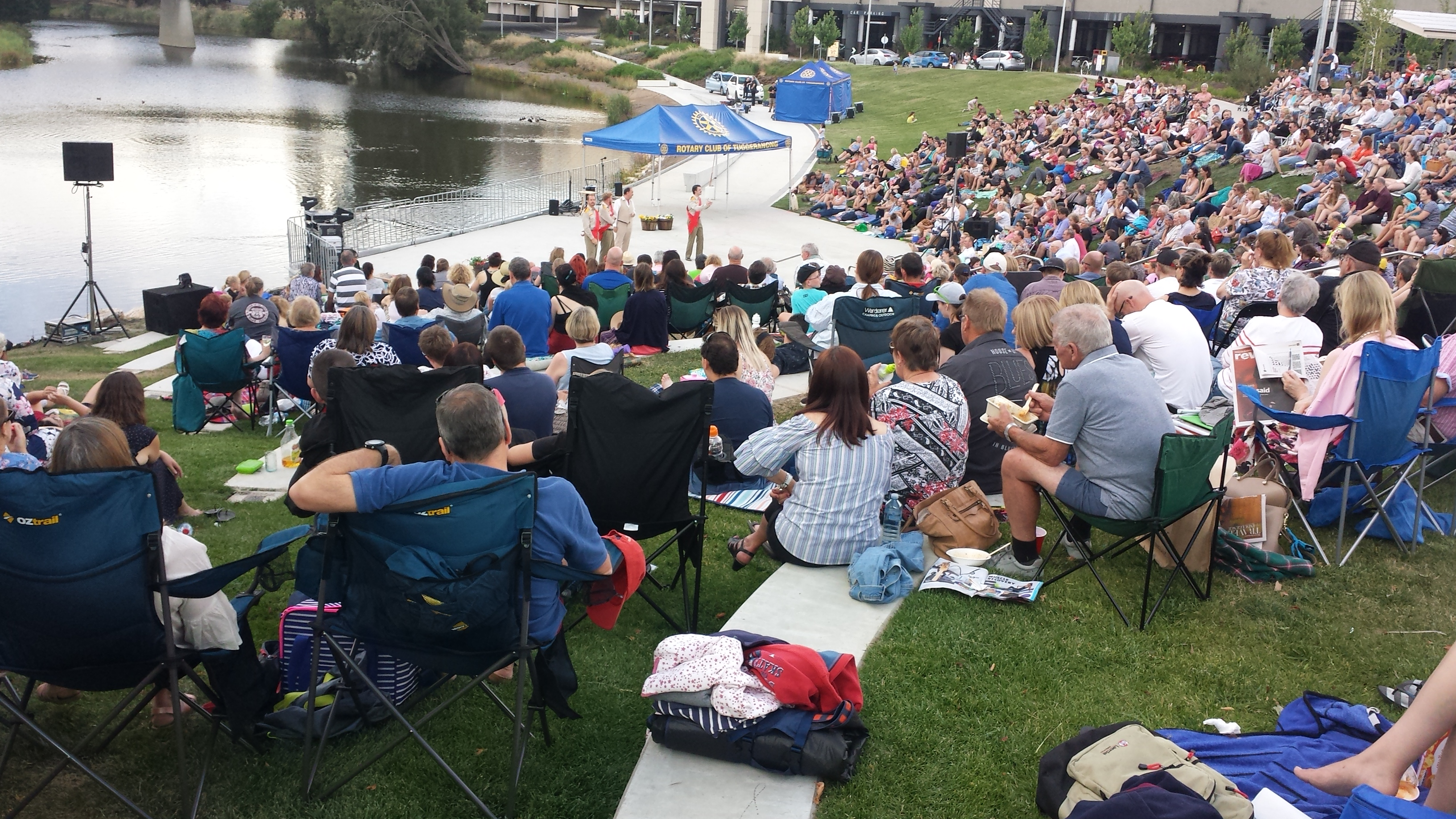
Shakespeare by the Lake performed by the Queanbeyan River 2018

Shakespeare by the Lakes is a summer festival of Shakespeare plays performed in Australian Capital Territory (ACT) public parks on the shores of Lake Tuggeranong and Lake Burley Griffin, and in parks near Canberra's city centre. Based on New York's Shakespeare in the Park festivals, Shakespeare by the Lakes was conceived and founded by Taimus Werner-Gibbings in 2017. Each year, the hosting theatre company Lakespeare & Co. (formed by Werner-Gibbings and collaborators Duncan Driver, Lexi Sekuless, Paul Leverenz and Cathy Day) produces free performances of Shakespearean texts in multiple locations, attracting over 5,000 patrons in each season.

== Seasons ==
The performances usually take place in February of each year. Due to restrictions on the size of gatherings during the Covid pandemic, no play was performed in 2021.

Year	Play	Venues
2018	Much Ado About Nothing	Tuggeranong Town Park, Glebe Park, QE II Park (Queanbeyan)
2019	Twelfth Night	Tuggeranong Town Park, Lanyon Homestead, Glebe Park, Patrick White Lawns (National Library).
2020	A Midsummer Night's Dream	Tuggeranong Town Park, Glebe Park, Patrick White Lawns (National Library), ANU Kambri
2022	As You Like It	Tuggeranong Town Park, Yerrabi Ponds, Patrick White Lawns (National Library), ANU Kambri
2024	Henry V	Tuggeranong Town Park, Patrick White Lawns (National Library), Vikings Park
2025	Macbeth	Tuggeranong Town Park, Patrick White Lawns (National Library), Haig Park
2026	The Taming of the Shrew	Tuggeranong Town Park, Patrick White Lawns (National Library), Glebe Park, Haig Park

== Reception ==
Twelfth Night Patrick White Lawns 24 Feb 2019

Free of charge to the general public, Shakespeare by the Lakes is financed by donations from local and federal government agencies, corporate sponsors, crowd-funding before the performances, and donations collected during the performances. The performances have consistently been well-received by critics and audiences alike, lauded by reviewers and audiences for being at the forefront of an emerging, 'proud yet self-effacing culture' in post-centenary Canberra, by presenting 'Shakespearean comedy as it was meant to be, fun-filled entertainment for every age,' which makes it an 'authentic and relatable way to treat the bard we so often revere but rarely embrace.'

== Spin-offs ==
In 2019, Shakespeare Down the Pub was conceived by Werner-Gibbings as an informal spin-off from Shakespeare by the Lakes (adapted from another United States Shakespeare performance concept, Shakespeare in the Bar) and was presented successfully by Lakespeare & Co. at the George Harcourt Inn in Canberra without scenery, props, stage-lighting or microphones while the audience ate, drank and shouted at the cast. This concept was then extended in later years at other venues, particularly Verity Lane.
