= Belconnen Bikeway =

Cycleway in Canberra, Australia

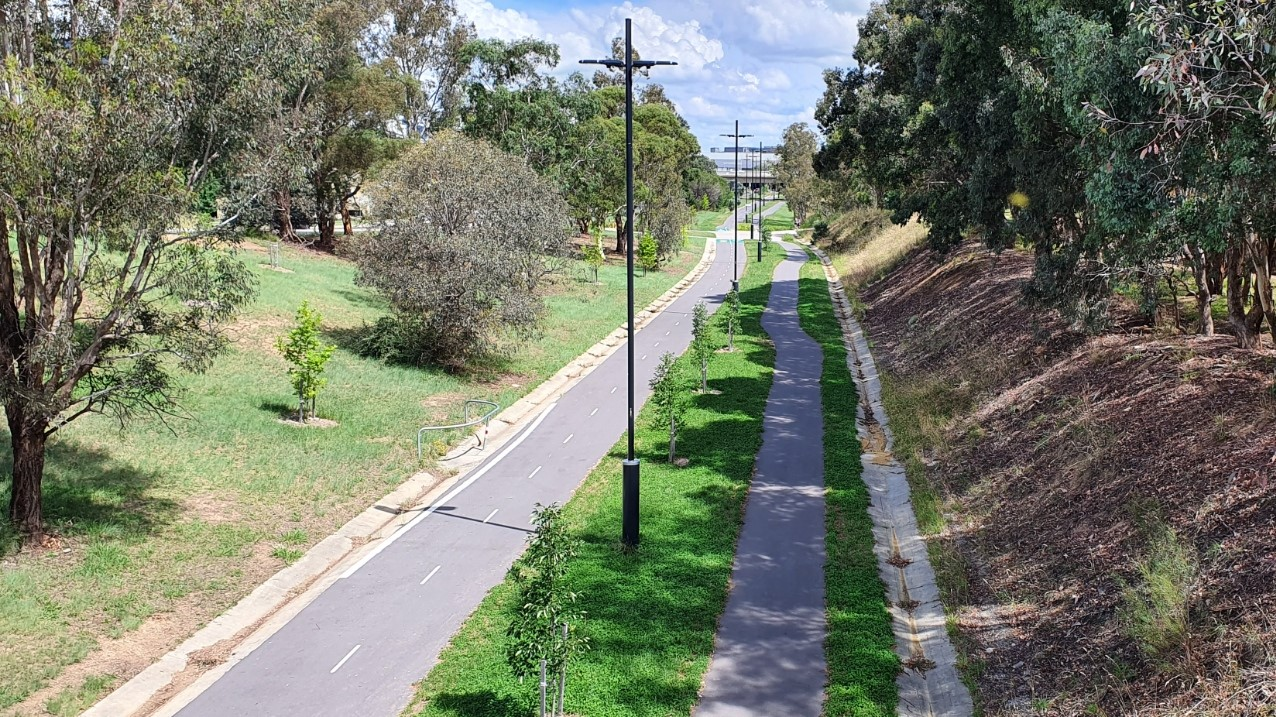
- The Belconnen Bikeway passing under Totterdell Street on the old busway alignment
- Length: 4.7 kilometres (2.9 mi)
- Location: Belconnen, Australian Capital Territory, Australia
- Established: 2020
- Designation: C3a
- Trailheads: Coulter Drive, Florey (west) to; Haydon Drive, Bruce (east)
- Use: Cycling
- Difficulty: Easy
- Season: All seasons
- Surface: Asphalt

The Belconnen Bikeway is a 4.7 km (2.9 mi) commuter cycleway in the district of Belconnen, a northern suburb of Canberra, Australia. It is designated as route C3a (City to Belconnen via Town Centre) by Transport Canberra, and connects the Belconnen Town Centre with the University of Canberra, Radford College and Canberra Institute of Technology (CIT) Bruce campus, as well as to the broader cycle network. The bikeway is one of two routes diverging from the main C3 trunk route. It was the second fully separated off-street cycle route in Canberra to be completed, providing an east–west link across the Town Centre.

Resulting from a commitment made by the ACT Government during the 2016 Territory election campaign, construction began in 2019. During construction, 200 trees were planted to provide shade along the route. Stage 1 of the bikeway opened in November 2020, at a cost of $6.291 million, exceeding the estimated tender cost of $5.653 million.

== Description of route ==
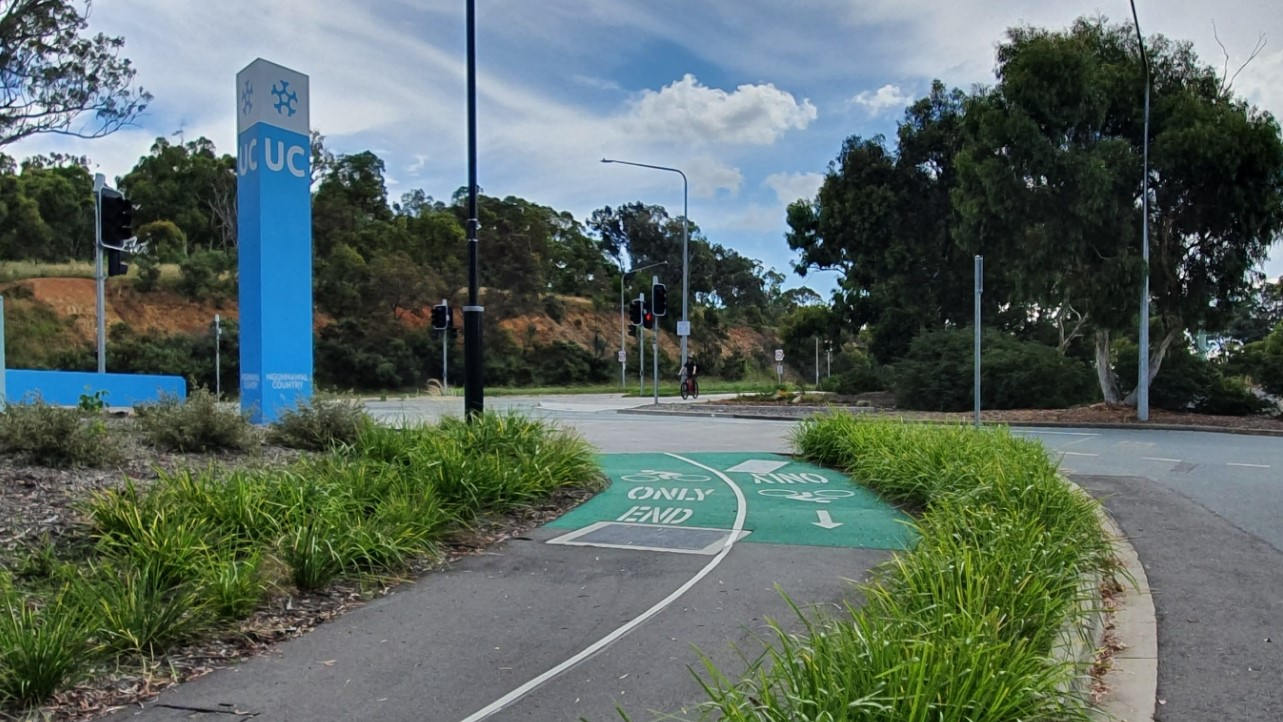
The Bikeway at the University of Canberra

From its western end, the bikeway follows a repurposed former busway for approximately 1 km (0.62 mi) between Coulter Drive and Emu Bank. This section runs parallel to Joynton Smith Drive, with underpasses below Totterdell and Luxton Streets. Formerly a road used exclusively used by busses accessing the Westfield Belconnen bus station, it closed in 2009 when the shopping centre was renovated and expanded. During construction of the bikeway the bus lanes were rebuilt as separated pedestrian and cycle paths, described during this phase as a "bicycle freeway".

At Emu Bank, the route continues east to Beissel Street via a shared path, before passing the Belconnen Arts Centre. Beyond this point, dedicated on-road cycle lanes are segregated from motor vehicle traffic to the Belconnen Skate Park, where it resumes as an off-street path, separated from pedestrians to Aikman Drive. The route follows Aikman Drive for a short distance before resuming as a shared path behind Canberra International Sports & Aquatic Centre to College Street. At College Street, pedestrians and bicycles are again separated to the University of Canberra, with the final section to Haydon Drive built as a dedicated cycle path.

== Extensions ==
Stage 2 of the Belconnen Bikeway is under construction as of January 2022. This will add two additional sections in the suburb of Bruce on off-street alignments. The first, following Haydon Drive south to Purdie Street, will improve connectivity to the CIT campus. A further extension along Battye Street will then run through the Australian Institute of Sport and join the main C3 route near GIO Stadium to Lyneham and onto the city via the Sullivans Creek cycle way. Funding has been provided for these works by both the ACT and Federal government.

An additional link from the Belconnen Arts Centre along separated cycle lanes on Benjamin Way was included when the project was originally announced, however no timeframe has been provided for its construction. The proposed link would connect with the C5 route from Belconnen to Weston Creek and Tuggeranong.

== See also ==
- Cycling in Canberra
