= Taimus Werner-Gibbings =

Australian politician (born 1981)

Taimus Werner-Gibbings MLA
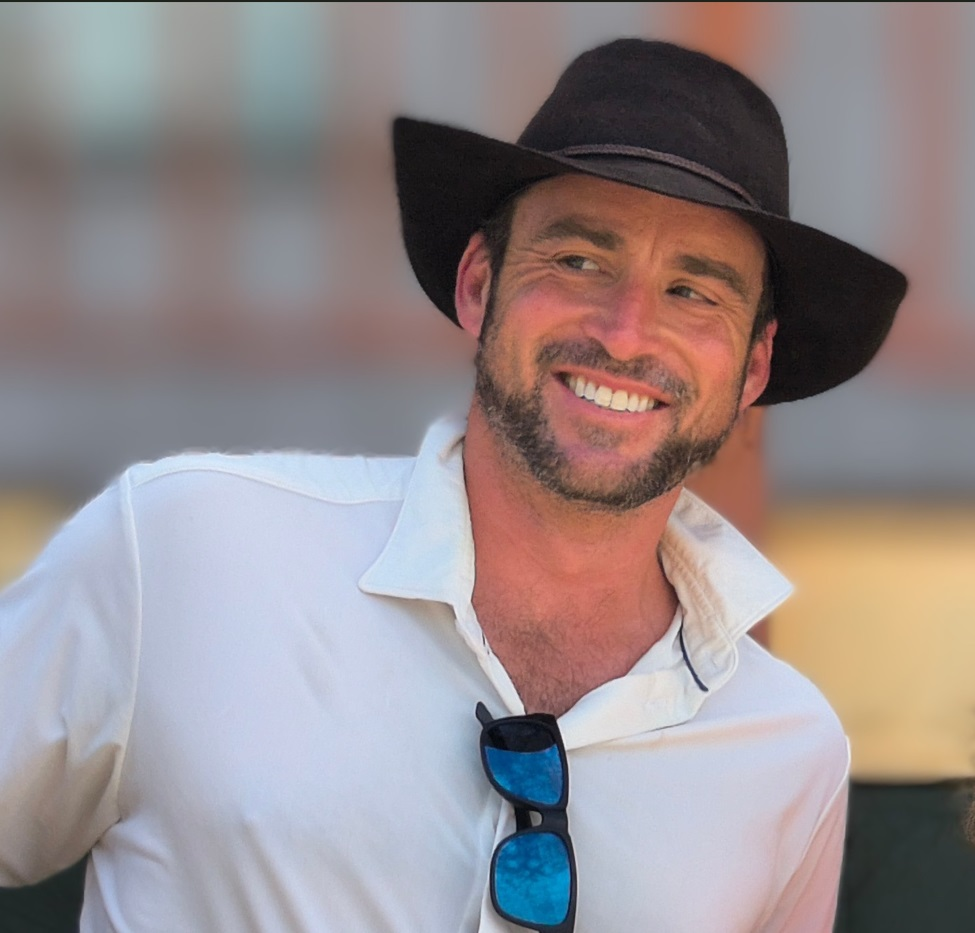

Member of the Australian Capital Territory Legislative Assembly for Brindabella
- Incumbent
- Assumed office 19 October 2024
- Preceded by: Mick Gentleman

Personal details
- Party: Labor
- Occupation: Politician

Taimus Werner-Gibbings (born 13 October 1981) is an Australian Labor politician who serves as a Member of the Australian Capital Territory Legislative Assembly, representing the Brindabella electorate.

== Early life and education ==
Werner-Gibbings was born in the town of Deniliquin in southwestern NSW, and his family moved to Wagga Wagga not long afterwards. In 1988, his family moved to Canberra where Werner-Gibbings attended Weston Primary School, Stromlo High School and Lake Tuggeranong College. A contemporary at Lake Tuggeranong College was Alicia Payne, MP for the Division of Canberra.

Werner-Gibbings was awarded an Arts/Law degree from the University of Sydney in 2004.

Werner-Gibbings began his career in the Australian Public Service in 2005 in the Department of Transport and Regional Services before moving to the Office of Privacy Commissioner. From 2008 to 2011 he was at Wesley College, University of Sydney first as Deputy Vice-Master then as Vice-Master (Dean of Student Services & Dean of Academic Services). He re-joined the Australian Public Service in 2012 in the Department of Environment, Sustainability and Water before moving to Parliament House as an Advisor to the Minister for Environment, Sustainability and Water, Tony Burke. He later worked for Tasmanian Senator Lisa Singh and federal member for the Division of Fenner, Dr Andrew Leigh before returning to the Australian Public Service in the Department of Defence.

== Political career ==
Werner-Gibbings first ran as a candidate for Brindabella in the Australian Capital Territory Legislative Assembly in the 2016 election. He gained 0.4 quotas and was not elected. He ran again at the 2020 election and despite achieving 0.48 of a quota, he was narrowly beaten by Johnathan Davis of the Greens. He was elected as a representative for Brindabella in the 2024 election, overtaking long-term Labor Minister Mick Gentleman as the second Labor representative in the electorate.

In the 11th ACT Legislative Assembly, Werner-Gibbings serves as:

- Assistant Speaker
- Chair of the Standing Committee on Economics, Industry and Recreation
- Deputy Chair of the Standing Committee on Legal Affairs
- Member of the Standing Committee on Integrity Commission and Statutory Office Holders
- Member of the Standing Committee on Transport and City Services
- Member of the Select Committee on Caretaker Conventions.

== Other interests ==
In 2018, Werner-Gibbings founded Shakespeare By The Lakes, which performs free Shakespeare plays in outdoor spaces around the ACT. It is the largest outdoor Shakespeare event in Australia and was inspired by New York's Shakespeare in the Park. Werner-Gibbings is a keen participant in local sport, coaching and umpiring junior Aussie Rules, cricket and soccer teams.

== Personal life ==
Werner-Gibbings and his wife live in Fadden. They have three children who all attend local public schools. The couple had a stillborn child in 2017. Werner-Gibbings was diagnosed with Type 1 Diabetes in early 1999, three months after he turned 17.
