= Cycling in Canberra =

Means of transportation in Canberra, Australia

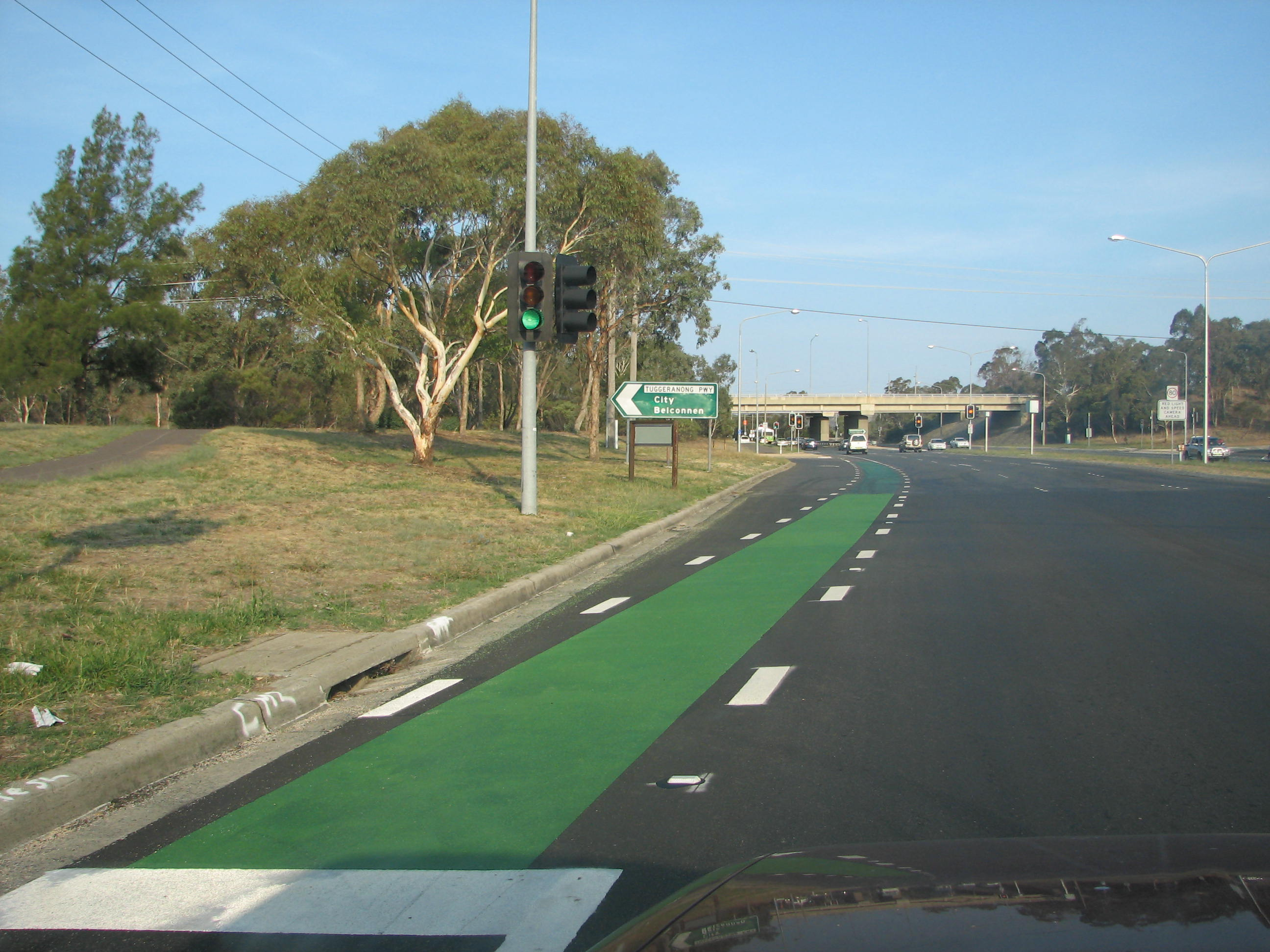
Many of Canberra's main roads incorporate on-road cycle lanes as well as off-road shared paths

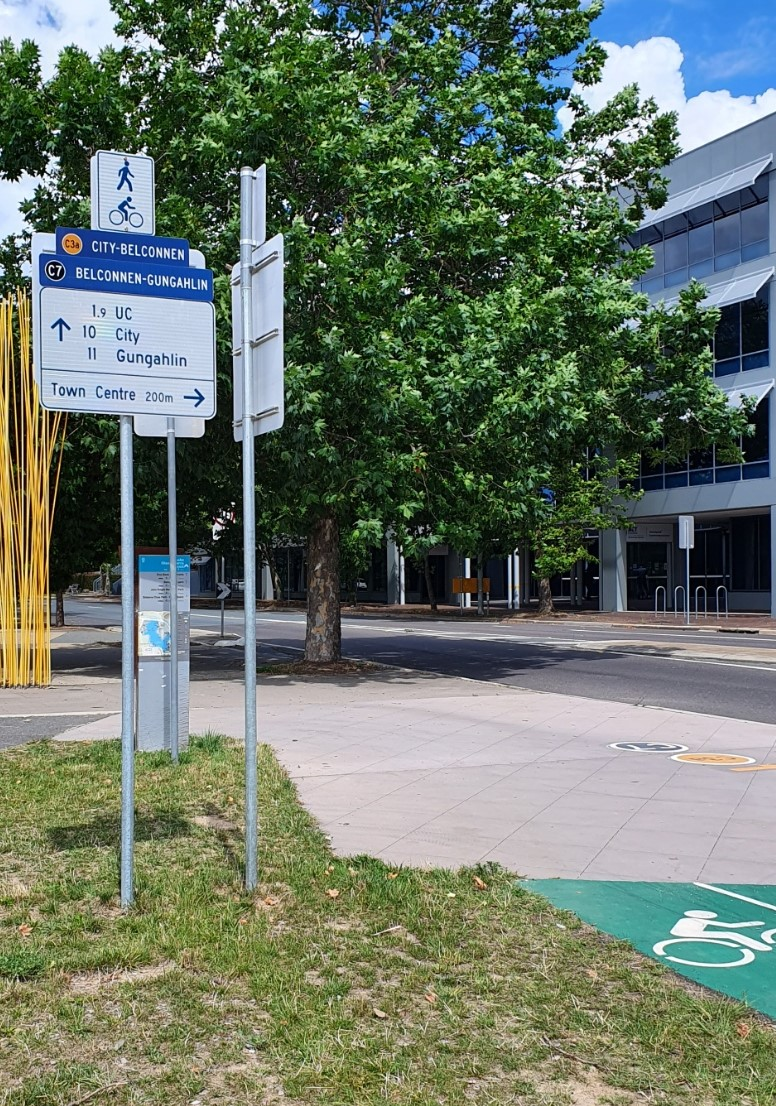
Wayfinding signage on the Belconnen Bikeway

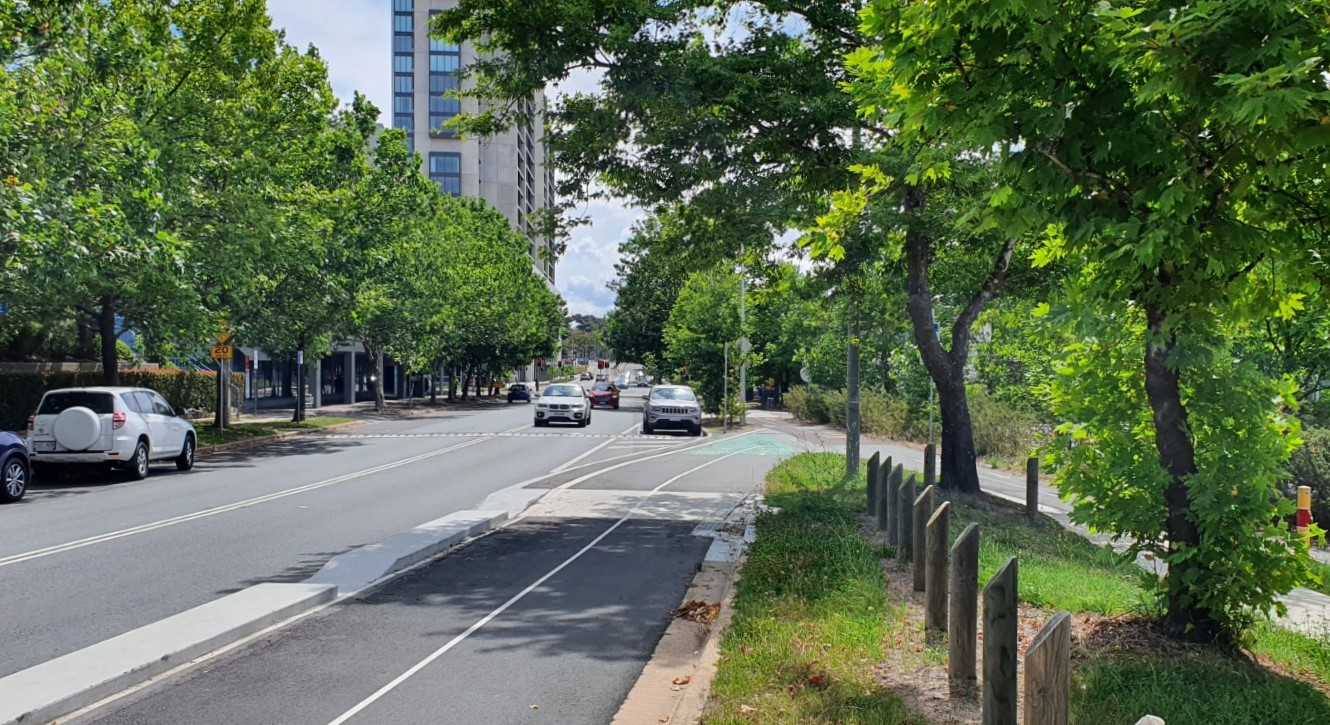
Segregated bike lane diverging from a shared path in the Belconnen Town Centre

Cycling in Canberra, the capital city of Australia, is a popular means of transportation, sporting and recreational pastime. Commuting in the city is supported by an extensive network of urban cycleways and on-street bicycle lanes. As a city established in the 20th century, Canberra's development was heavily influenced by the automobile for much of its history. The popularity of cycling in the city has increased dramatically in the 21st century with growing awareness of environmental issues, government policy supporting active transport and investment in cycling infrastructure. This has led to the development of a strong cycling culture.

A relatively small city, Canberra has some of the highest rates of active transport in the country. Australian Bicycle Council research released in 2014 showed that more people in Canberra cycled than in any other Australian city or state, against a slight decline in the national participation rate, with 47% of residents reporting they had cycled at least once during the year. In 2019, Austroads data suggested as many as 93,700 residents cycled in a typical week, with 183,300 riding at least once per year. 57% of Canberra households owned at least one bicycle. Amongst regular cyclists, the main reasons for cycling were commuting to work or travelling for study, while those who rode less frequently were more likely to do so for recreation. The number of male cyclists in the city is significantly higher than females, although the participation rates for both are still higher than the national average.

As the location of the headquarters of the Australian Institute of Sport, many professional and elite-level cyclists live in Canberra, or travel to the city for training. The Australian Capital Territory and surrounding region is a popular destination for both on and off-road cycling, with the city hosting a number of national and international competitions across a variety of cycling disciplines. The Trek Bicycle Corporation's Australian headquarters is located in the Canberra suburb of Fyshwick, taking advantage of the cycle-friendly infrastructure and varied terrain offered by the many mountain biking trails throughout the Territory.

== History ==
=== 20th century ===
Cycling has been a popular recreational pastime in the Canberra region since before the city's foundation in 1913. The Queanbeyan Cycling Club was established in 1899 (located just across the present-day border with New South Wales). Additional cycling clubs were formed in Canberra and Kingston during the 1920s. By March 1927, the Canberra Cycling Club alone had over 90 members - at that time the population was just 6000.

During the 1960s, transport network planning in Canberra was based around private vehicles as the primary mode. A network of dedicated cycle paths was first proposed by the National Capital Development Commission (NCDC) in the early 1970s. A 1973 NCDC news feature discussed the benefits of building such a network to supplement the pedestrian paths and equestrian trails linking the suburbs, although considered the costs to be quite high given that there were very few cyclists in the city at that time. It was estimated that 25% of high school students rode bikes to school, while fewer than 3% of university students did the same. From a survey of 363 workers in the employment hub of Phillip in the Woden Valley district, only 1 indicated they cycled to work. The first cycle path, considered a pilot for an extended commuter network was opened from Dickson to the city along a route parallel to Sullivan's creek. The path was officially opened by Minister for Urban and Regional Development Tom Uren, while the occasion was celebrated with a race between local media personalities. Today, the Sullivans Creek shared path remains the busiest commuter cycling route in Canberra.

Despite the low number of bicycle commuters, cycling was gaining popularity in the Territory. Although there were some sporting facilities operated by cycling clubs, including a velodrome that opened in Narrabundah in 1972, there was little public investment to address the needs of local cyclists. In 1974, a mass ride involving more than 50 bikes was organised by Howard Rawson and Bill Crowle. The ride from Belconnen to the city via Belconnen Way and Macarthur Avenue received significant media attention, drawing attention to the lack of infrastructure that forced cyclists to ride on main roads. Further protest rides would lead to the formation of cycling advocacy group Pedal Power ACT in 1975.

In its 1975 Annual Report the National Capital Development Commission published a photograph, apparently approving, of a demonstration of cyclists rallying in the city centre to obtain better cycle facilities. However in a private Commission internal newsletter it published a cartoon mocking cyclists, depicting them as pogo-stick riders.

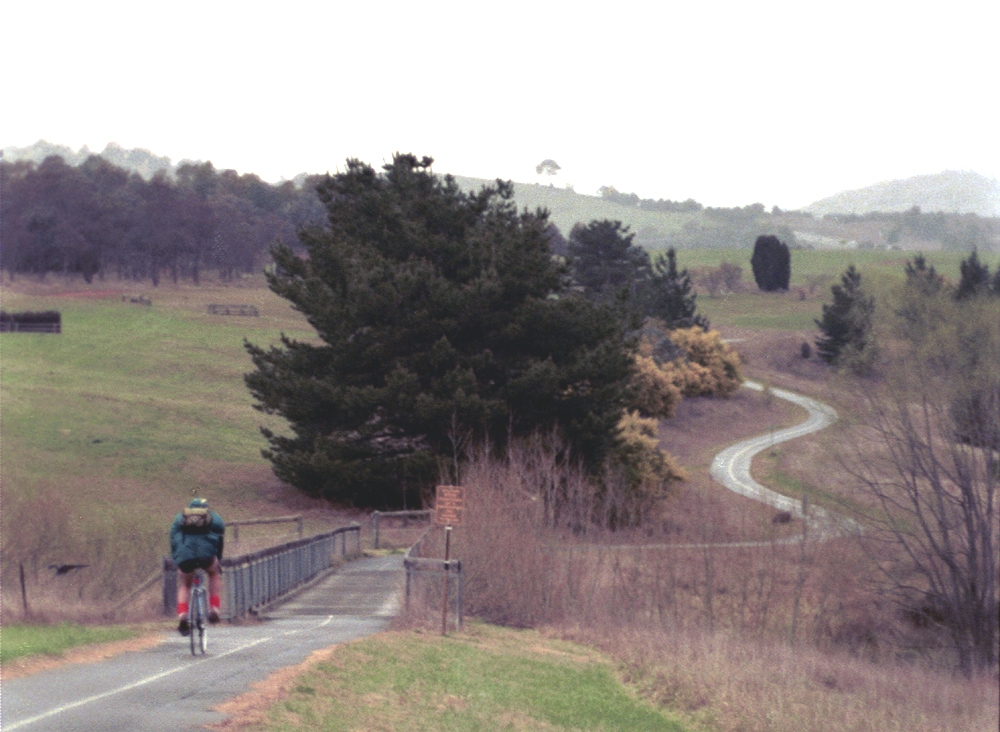
A cyclist on one of Canberra's many commuter bike paths near Weston in 1996

Census data in 1981 showed that the number of commuters cycling to work in Canberra had increased from just 0.9% of all trips to 2.1% in the five years since 1976, coinciding with the extension of the NCDC's cycle path network. Yet modelling during this period did not consider commuter cycling when determining future transport policy. Planning continued to favour private cars and the growth in bicycle commuters had stagnated by the mid-1980s. This situation remained largely unchanged until the ACT achieved self-government in 1989, as well as a renewed interest in cycling as a sport during the 1990s.

Between the 1970s and 1990s, the district of Tuggeranong was the first in the ACT to be developed with a cycling network incorporated into the design of new neighbourhoods, now a feature of all new Canberra suburbs.

In 1990, the Australian Institute of Sport established its Men's Road Cycling program in Canberra under coach Heiko Salzwedel. The Women's program was added two years later in 1992. A Canberra-based mountain biking program established at the same time was later dropped. In 1993, the ACT Cycling Federation (now Cycling ACT, merged into AusCycling) split from the NSW Cycling Federation as a separate entity governing bicycle racing in Canberra.

The first Big Canberra Bike Ride was held in 1999. This non-competitive, mass participation event has since become an annual charity ride, encouraging Canberrans of all ages and abilities to meet at the Albert Hall before cycling different scenic routes around the city.

=== 21st century ===
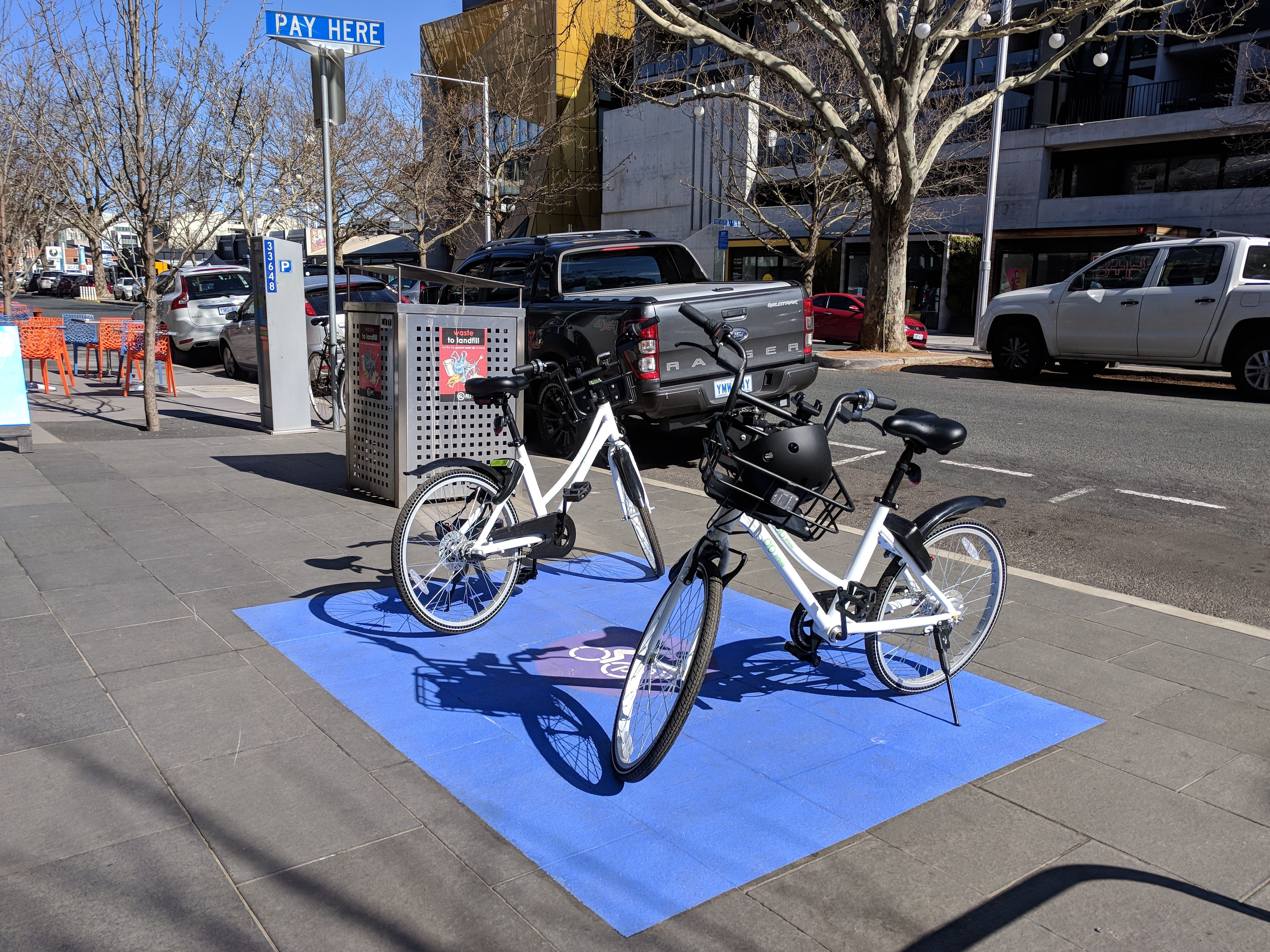
Dockless Airbike parking area in Braddon

Significant investment in new cycling infrastructure during the 2000–10s and Canberra's growing reputation as a cycling destination was credited with noticeably increasing non-competitive, social participation in events organised by the Canberra Cycling Club by the mid-2010s.

In 2017, the ACT Environment, Planning and Sustainable Development Directorate proposed a variation to the Planning and Development Act 2007 to incentivise property developers to incorporate end-of-trip facilities such as secure bicycle parking, showers and lockers, in new and renovated buildings to encourage uptake of active transport options.

Sydney based bike share company Airbike expanded into Canberra in 2018, despite concerns that it would lead to bikes being dumped around the city and in Lake Burley Griffin.

In 2020, the ACT became the second jurisdiction after Western Australia to implement the Crime Stoppers Bikelinc platform, a database that allows owners to register details of their bicycles to assist police in tracking and returning stolen bikes. ACT Policing reported a 25% increase in bicycle theft across Canberra between 2017 and 2020, yet only a small number of recovered bikes were able to be returned to their owners

Also in 2020, City Renewal Authority began installing public bike repair stations in areas with high bicycle traffic in an effort to encourage cycling as a preferred mode of transport. These stations include an air compressor for inflating tyres, common tools such as allen keys and spanners and QR codes linking to information on bicycle maintenance and how to use the equipment.

== Cycling culture ==
Canberra is renowned as a cycling destination both in Australia and abroad. The cultural influence of cycling on the city is represented in the local arts community, through public installations and special events such as an exclusive Australian screening of Dutch documentary Why We Cycle at the National Film & Sound Archive in 2018

A key campaign to promote Canberra internationally and drive growth the tourism sector is the promotion of cycling events and tours within the city and surrounding region. A number of businesses operating in Canberra currently provide small group bicycle tours.

Bentspoke Brewing Co, a local boutique brewery have adopted a cycling theme, both in the name of their beverages (e.g. Crankshaft, Sprocket and Fixie) and bicycle inspired decor for their brew pub in the suburb of Braddon. The company is a major sponsor of local cycling events, including the 2017 Kowalski Classic mountain bike race on the Sparrow Hill trails in Kowen Forest. The 2021 ACT BMX Jam staged a round at the Bentspoke cannery in the industrial suburb of Mitchell, while Bentspoke's Braddon brewpub is the starting location for the Monaro Cloudride 1000.

The Canberra Bicycle Museum previously operated within the Tradesman's Union club in the suburb of Dickson until closing in 2009. The majority of museum's extensive collection of over 1000 rare and historic bicycles were sold to the public and collectors.

Built to celebrate the city's 100th anniversary in 2013, the Centenary Trail is a signposted 145 km (90 mi) loop consisting of sealed shared paths, fire trails, equestrian trails and public roads that is designed to allow cyclists and hikers to explore the city's heritage, natural environments and native wildlife. The trail, which skirts Canberra's urban fringe, quickly earned a positive reputation in the cycling press and is a popular day trip for local and visiting off-road cyclists.

== Commuter cycling network ==
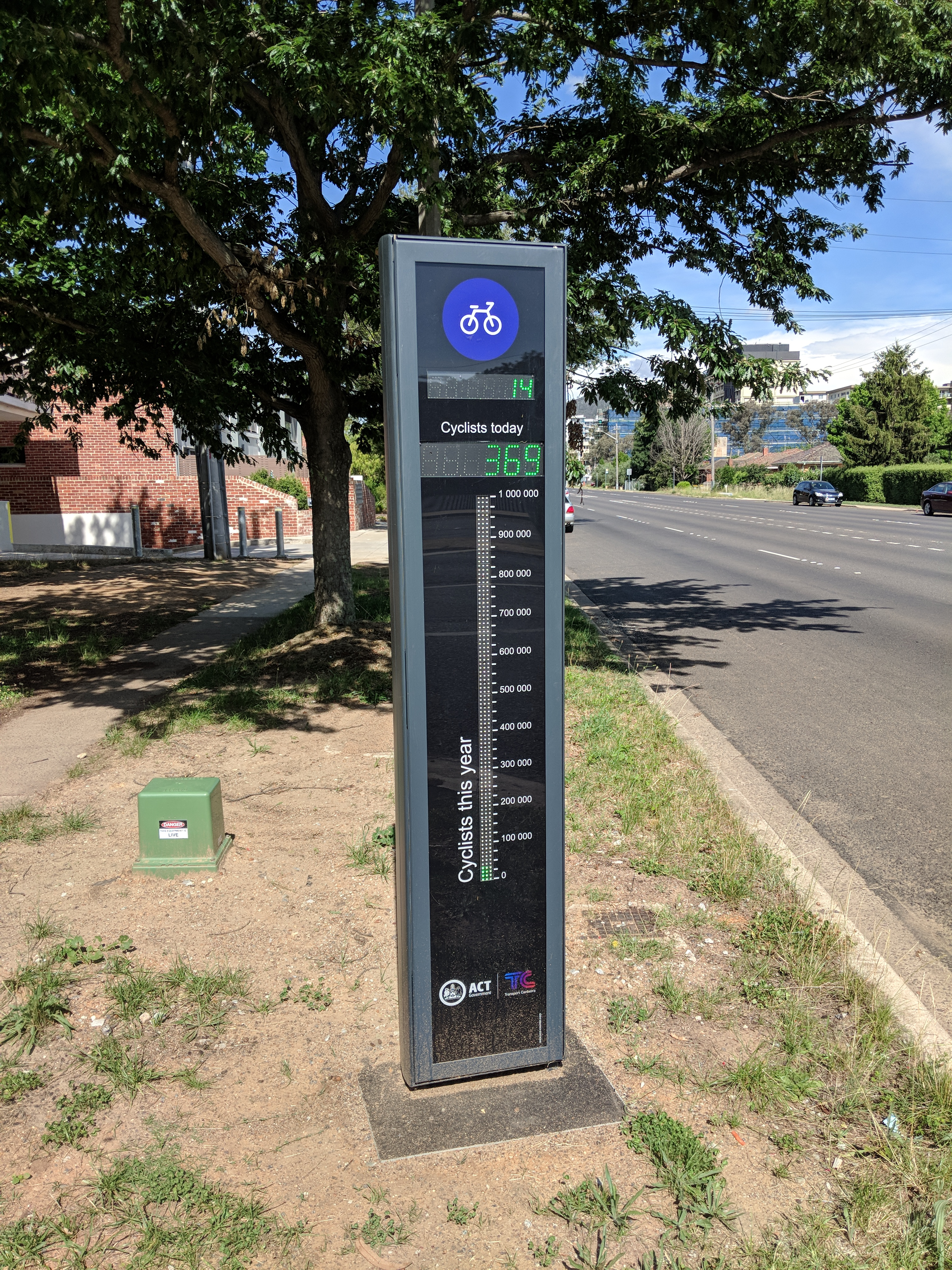
"Bicycle barometer" used for counting bicycle traffic on the Sullivans Creek cycling path

Canberra's network of cycling routes uses both shared paths (including some with grade separation) and on-road cycle lanes. In 2021, American cycling advocacy group PeopleForBikes ranked Canberra 34th out of 770 cities for the quality of its cycling networks – the highest ranking for any Australian city, ahead of Alice Springs and Melbourne. On some streets within the Civic precinct, as well on the Belconnen Bikeway, cycle routes are segregated from motor vehicle traffic. There are ten signposted routes linking the major town centres and other points of interest:

Route	Destination	Notes
C1	City to Gungahlin	Continues to Taylor
C2	City to Queanbeyan
C3a	City to Belconnen (via Belconnen Bikeway)	Continues to Charnwood
C3b	City to Belconnen (via Town Centre Bypass)	Continues to Charnwood
C4	City to Tuggeranong via Woden	Continues to Conder
C5	Belconnen to Tuggeranong via Weston Creek
C6	Australian National University to Dickson
C7	Belconnen to Gungahlin	Continues to Forde
C8	City Loop
C9	Gungahlin to Canberra Airport	Continues to Taylor
LBG	Lake Burley Griffin Loop

== Cycling as a sport ==
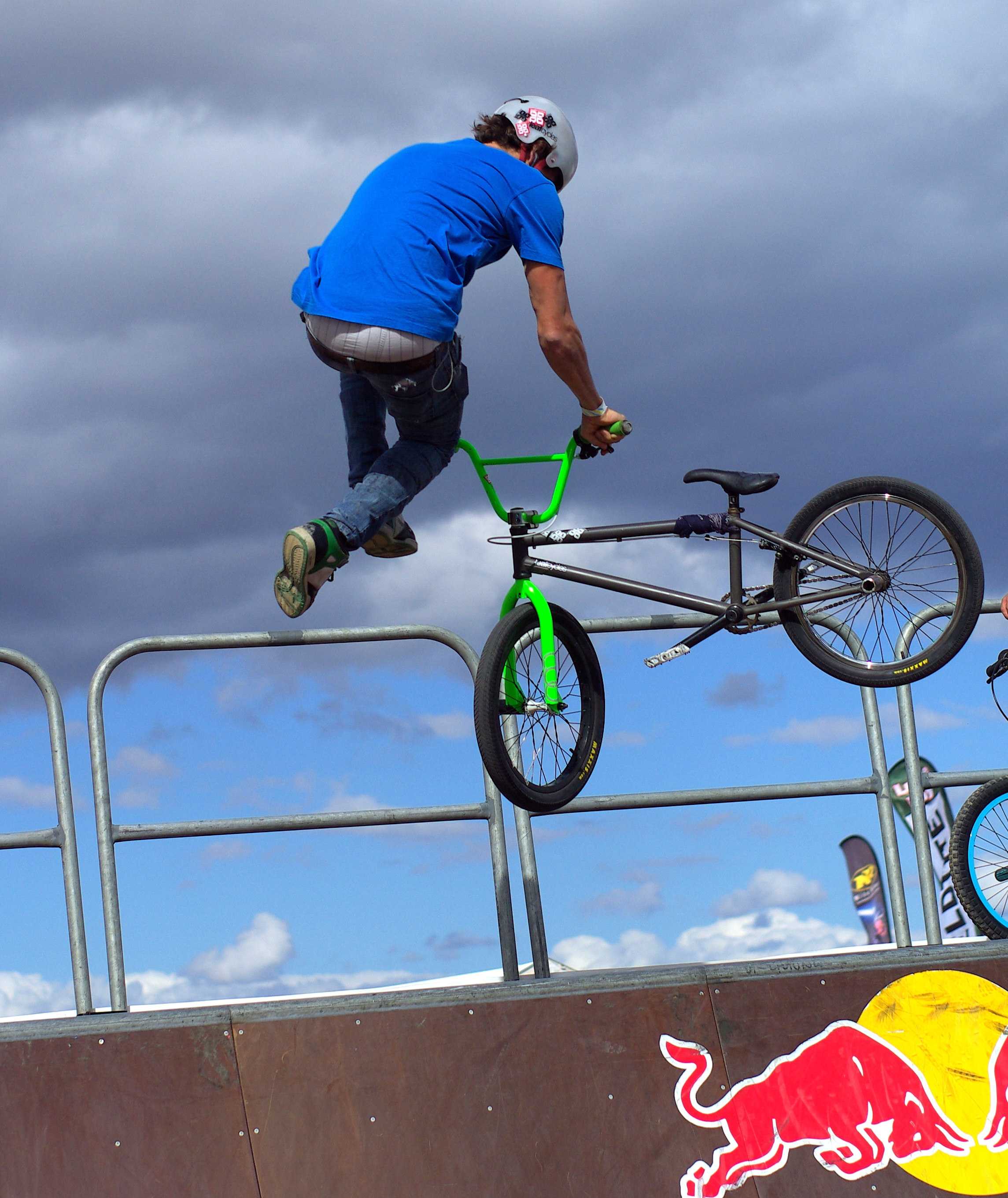
Joel Dodd from the Leaf Cycles Australia team performs a tailwhip at World MTB championships in Canberra, 2009

Canberra well represented in terms of competitive and professional cycling. In 2009, the city hosted the UCI Mountain Bike World Championships at Stromlo Forest Park, while the Australian Institute of Sport in the suburb of Bruce maintains a road cycling training program for competitors at elite level.

Notable competitive cyclists from Canberra include two-time Commonwealth Games women's road race medallist Chloe Hosking, Commonwealth Games and Olympic medallist Michael Rogers, Team Sky road racer Mathew Hayman, and Orica–AIS rider Jessie MacLean. Others who have trained and competed in Canberra include 1992 Olympic Road Race Gold Medallist Kathy Watt, Olympian and successful international coach Gary Sutton and dual 1998 Commonwealth Games gold medallist Anna Wilson.

The mobile training app Today's Plan was developed in Canberra during 2015, attracting local investors and support from the ACT Government. The platform supports cyclists to train remotely, while monitored by coaches and teammates. This app was adopted by several UCI WorldTeams, including Team Sky, Bora–Hansgrohe and Team Bahrain Victorious.

=== Events and competitions ===
Canberra hosts a variety of annual events and competitions including:

BMX

- AusCycling BMX Territory Championships – A state-level racing competition held at the Canberra BMX Club track
- ACT BMX Jam – A freestyle competition held at various locations around Canberra

Hillclimbs

- Giro d'Canberra – a 130 km (81 mi) charity road race, including a 2,500 m (8,200 ft) hillclimb.
- Fitz's Challenge – A challenging hillclimb race in the Brindabella Range.
- Five Peaks Challenge – A charity ride involving a series of short hillclimbs up hills within the urban area.

Off Road Events

- The Stromlo Classic – A UCI and AusCycling sanctioned competition held annually at the Stromlo Forest Park hosted by the Canberra Offroad Cycling Club
- Monaro Cloudride 1000 and Cloudride Prologue 500 – a 1,000 km (620 mi) bikepacking event taking in Canberra and the alpine terrain of the adjacent Monaro region and Snowy Mountains. The shorter 500 km (310 mi) prologue event is a testing and preparation event, also suitable for riders of a lower fitness level.
- AMB100 Marathon – Has been held at Stomlo Forest Park and Kowen Forest trails.

Road Races

- Canberra Tour – a two-day, multi-stage event hosted by the Canberra Cycling Club
- Tour de Femme – Australia's largest women's-only cycle race
- ACT Criterium Championships – held on the Stephen Hodge Criterium Cycling Circuit

Track Events

- ACT Track Championships – local competition held by the Canberra Cycling Club

=== Venues ===
==== Stromlo Forest Park ====
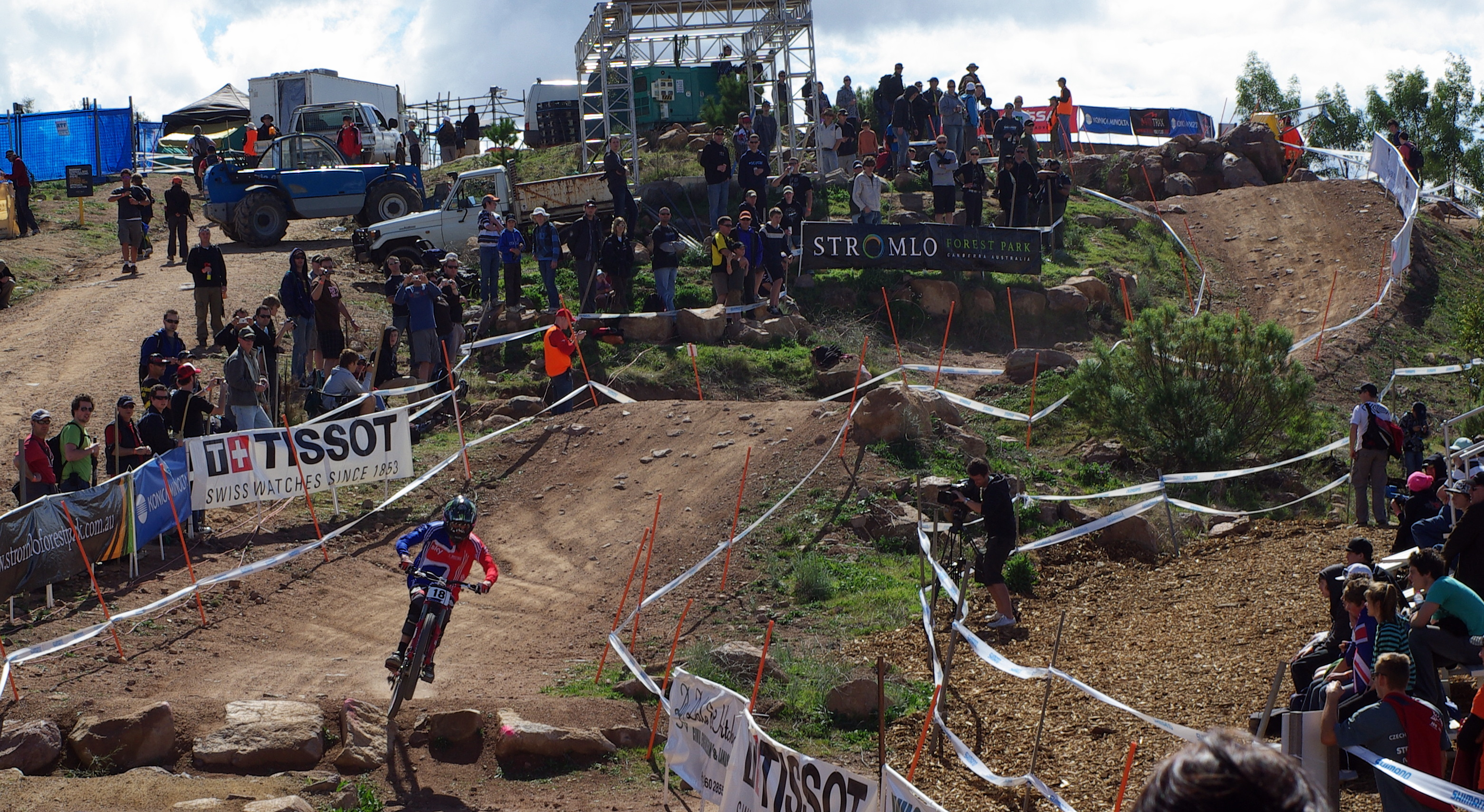
Stromlo Forest Park is a major venue for downhill mountain biking

Stromlo Forest Park is a major mountain biking venue located just outside of Canberra. It was the venue for the 2008 UCI Mountain Bike World Cup (Round 6) and hosted the 2009 UCI Mountain Bike & Trials World Championships, as well as national competitions including Round 2 of the Fox Superflow enduro series in 2019.

The park has 50 km (31 mi) of maintained trails, built to International Mountain Bicycling Association difficulty rating criteria and ranging from easy to extremely difficult. There is a training area consisting of a 4 km (2.5 mi) course with progressive increases in difficulty and alternative paths around obstacles along its length. A shuttle bus also operates on weekends to carry riders from the car park to the trailheads for the downhill and jumps courses. At the base of the mountain, there is a pump track and BMX jumps. Other facilities at Stromlo include four-cross and trials courses, as well as guest amenities including a cafe and bike shop.

The Stephen Hodge Criterium Cycling Circuit is a 1,200 m (3,900 ft) criterium venue with multiple configurations, located within Stromlo Forest Park. The circuit, which hosts international competitions, is also open to the public at no cost when not in competitive use. The setting of the track in bushland has led to incidents where crits have been interrupted by kangaroos.

==== Sparrow Hill ====
Sparrow Hill, in the Kowen district east of Canberra is another popular mountain biking location, mainly used for local competitions by the Canberra Off-Road Cycling club. These trails opened as an alternative to Stromlo Forest Park, after it was destroyed in the 2003 Canberra bushfires, offering four cross-country loop courses of various lengths and difficulties. Other popular recreational off-road cycling trails can be found at Majura Pines and Tuggeranong Pines on Canberra's outskirts. It was the venue for the now defunct Kowalski Classic off-road race and the AMB100 Marathon, which relocated here from Stromlo Forest Park in 2020 and ran as an asynchoronous race due to COVID-19.

==== Narrabundah Velodrome ====
The Narrabundah Velodrome (locally known as the "Bundahdome") hosts track cycling club meets and competitions. Originally built in 1972, the facility was not suitable for interstate competitions due to the very steep bank angles of the curves and harsh transitions. The outdoor velodrome was closed in April 2013 due to concerns about the condition of this facility and despite uncertainty about its future, was reopened following remediation and re-surfacing works in time to host the 2014 ACT Track Championships. In addition to Territory Championship events, the Capital Region Masters Cycling Club hold regular race meets at the velodrome.

==== BMX ====
There are a number of BMX tracks throughout the suburbs, including the Canberra BMX Club in Melba, the Tuggeranong BMX track in Kambah and at Yerrabi Pond District Park in Gungahlin. Both the Canberra BMX Club and Canberra Off Road Cyclists club stage events at these facilities throughout the year.

== Cycling rules and regulations ==
Unlike New South Wales and Victoria, cyclists in the Australian Capital Territory are permitted to ride on standard footpaths. Cyclists are also not required to dismount at pedestrian crossings. While helmets are required, there are some exemptions, including for religious headgear. With the use of dashcams becoming more widespread, cycling advocacy groups have lobbied for the ACT Government to enact harsher penalties for negligent driving that injures vulnerable road users.

In general, when riding on public roads, cyclists have the same legal rights and obligations as other road users, although there are some road rules that are specifically designed to protect cyclists and other vulnerable road users. Drivers of motor vehicles are required to leave at least 1 meter of lateral spacing when passing cyclists on roads with a speed limit of 60 km/h or below. Where the speed limit is over 60 km/h, this distance increases to 1.5 meters. Cyclists are permitted to use roads as an alternative to dedicated cycle paths, but must only ride in marked cycle lanes where these are provided and must give way to vehicles signalling a left turn. Riding two-abreast is permitted at all times, however it is encouraged that cyclists move to single file to let traffic pass and exercise commonsense based on traffic conditions. Front and rear lights are required for on road cycling at night and in poor visibility.

== Public transport ==
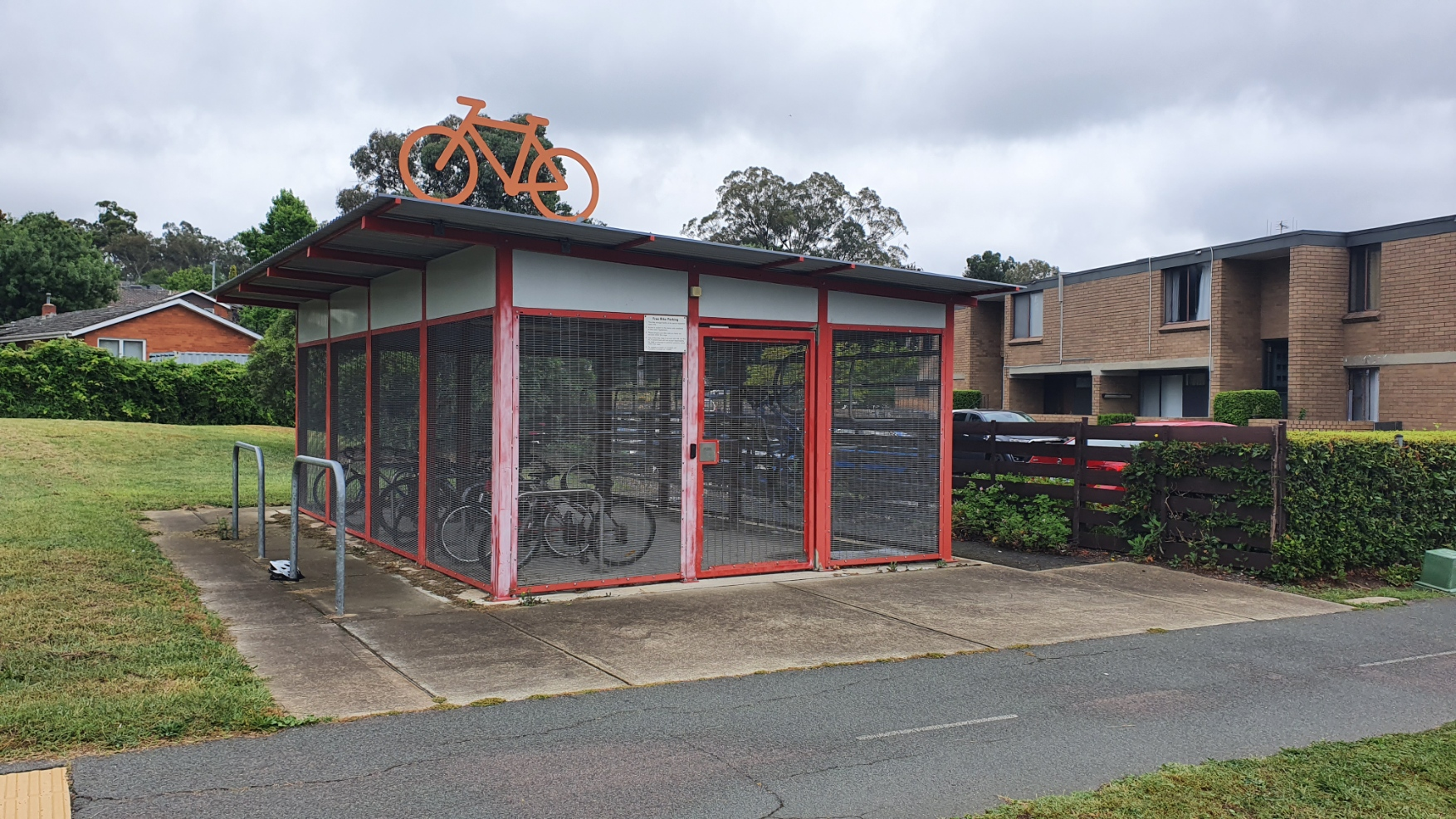
Secure bicycle cage for commuters at a bus stop in the Woden Valley district

The Canberra light rail network was designed to integrate with cycling and other forms of active transport. All light rail vehicles have bicycle racks on board. Outdoor Bike racks are also installed at all stations, as well as some bus stops. No locks are provided, and use of these racks is at passengers' own risk. A secure, covered bicycle cage is available at the Nullarbor Avenue light rail station. Under the "Bike and Ride" initiative, Transport Canberra maintains additional bike cages key bus stops and interchanges across the network that can be accessed on request using a valid MyWay card. Most ACTION busses have bicycle carriers installed on the front of the vehicle for up to two bicycles (it is the passenger's responsibility to securely attach and remove bicycles when boarding or alighting). Carriage of bicycles is included in the fare for both bus and tram services.

== Bicycle organisations and groups ==
- Pedal Power ACT – the largest cycling organisation and advocacy group in Canberra. Formed in 1975.
- Canberra Cycling Club – Canberra's oldest cycling club, formed in 1926. The club is an affiliate of AusCycling and hosts regular road and track events, including the Canberra Tour and a winter road racing series.
- Canberra Off Road Cyclists (CORC) – Australia's largest mountain bike club, and a MTBA foundation club formed in 1988.
- Capital Region Masters Cycling Club – formerly the ACT Veterans Cycling Club, formed in 1993, catering to cyclists aged over 30. The club runs regular road, track and criterium events.
- Vikings Cycling Club ACT – a club based in Canberra's southern suburbs that hosts social and competitive events for cyclists of all ages and abilities, particularly focussing on increased participation by women, junior cyclists and those with a disability.

== See also ==
- Belconnen Bikeway
- Cycling in Australia
