= Turner, Australian Capital Territory =

Suburb of Canberra, Australia

Turner
- Suburb
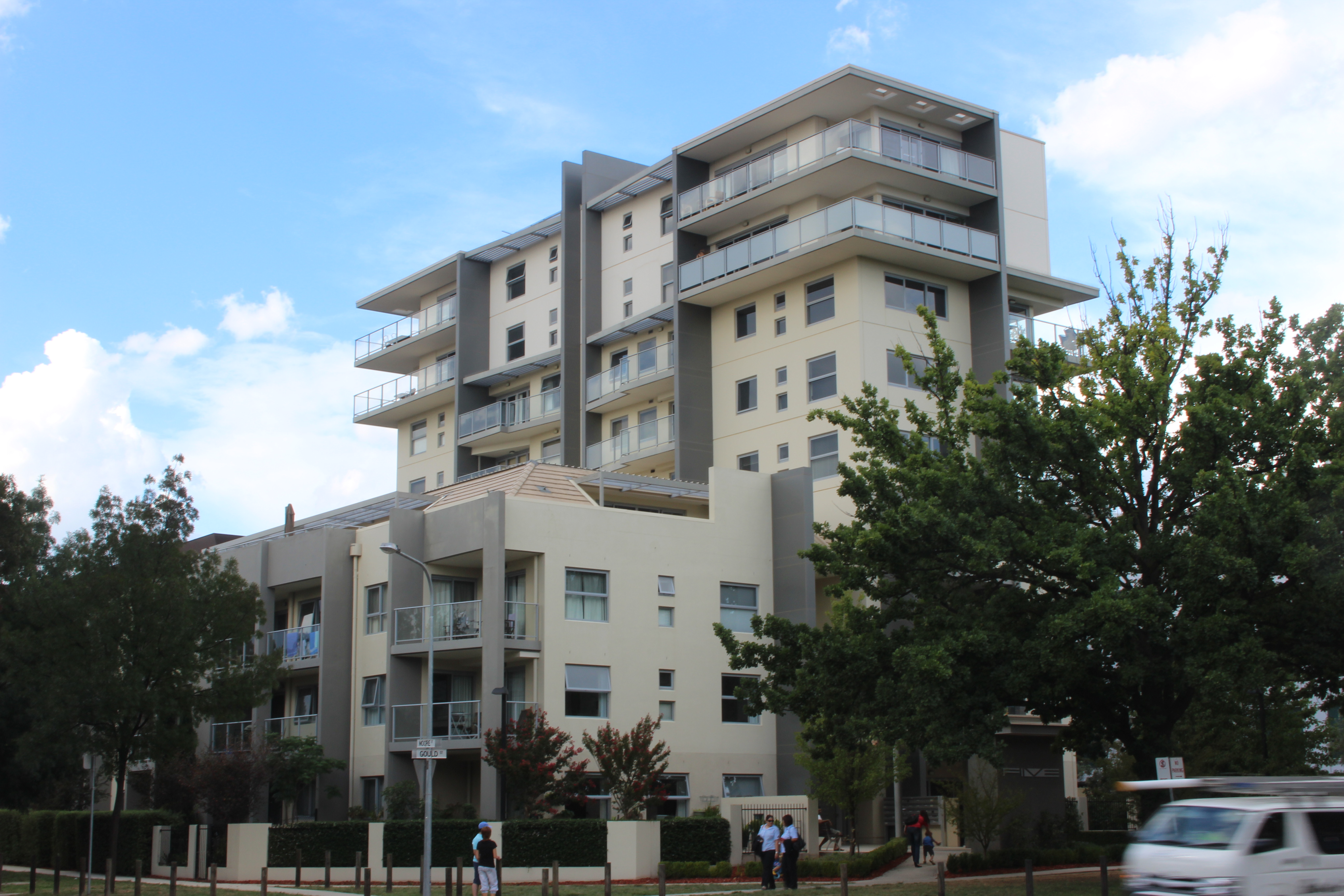
- Apartments on Gould Street

- Coordinates: 35°16′07″S 149°07′27″E
- Country: Australia
- State: Australian Capital Territory
- City: Canberra
- District: North Canberra
- Location: 3 km (1.9 mi) NNW of Canberra CBD; 17 km (11 mi) WNW of Queanbeyan; 88 km (55 mi) SW of Goulburn; 285 km (177 mi) SW of Sydney
- Established: 1928

Government
  - Territory electorate: Kurrajong
  - Federal division: Canberra

Area
  - Total: 1.5 km^{2} (0.58 sq mi)
- Elevation: 572 m (1,877 ft)

Population
  - Total: 4,470 (2021 census)
  - Density: 2,980/km^{2} (7,720/sq mi)
- Postcode: 2612
Suburbs around Turner
O'Connor	Lyneham	Dickson
Acton	Turner	Braddon
Acton	City	Braddon

Turner is a suburb in the Australian city of Canberra, close to Canberra City and the Australian National University (located in the suburb of Acton).

Turner is named after Sir George Turner, a Federalist, legislator and one of the founders of the Australian Constitution. He was the 18th Premier of Victoria, and later Federal Treasurer under prime ministers Barton, Deakin and Reid. Streets in Turner are mostly named after writers, legislators and pioneers.

== Demographics ==
In the 2021 census, the population of Turner was 4,470, including 56 (1.3%) Indigenous persons and 2,911 (65.1%) Australian-born persons. Only 12.5% of dwellings were separate houses (compared to the Australian average of 72.3%), while 13.8% were semi-detached, row or terrace houses (Australian average: 12.6%) and 73.2% were flats, units or apartments (Australian average: 14.2%). 45.1% of the population were professionals, compared to the Australian average of 24.0%. Notably 25.1% worked in central government administration, compared to the Australian average of 1.1%, although the ACT-wide average is 17.1%. Turner is favoured by students and young adults with 48.1% of its population in the 20- to 34-year-old age group (compared to the Australian average of 20.5%). The suburb has few children under 15: 7.7%, compared to 18.2% Australia-wide. 38.5% of the dwellings are occupied by single person households, compared to the Australian average of 25.6%. 59.9% of the population had no religion, while 12.3% were Catholic, 4.7% not stated, 4.6% Anglican and 3.1% Hindu.

== Design ==
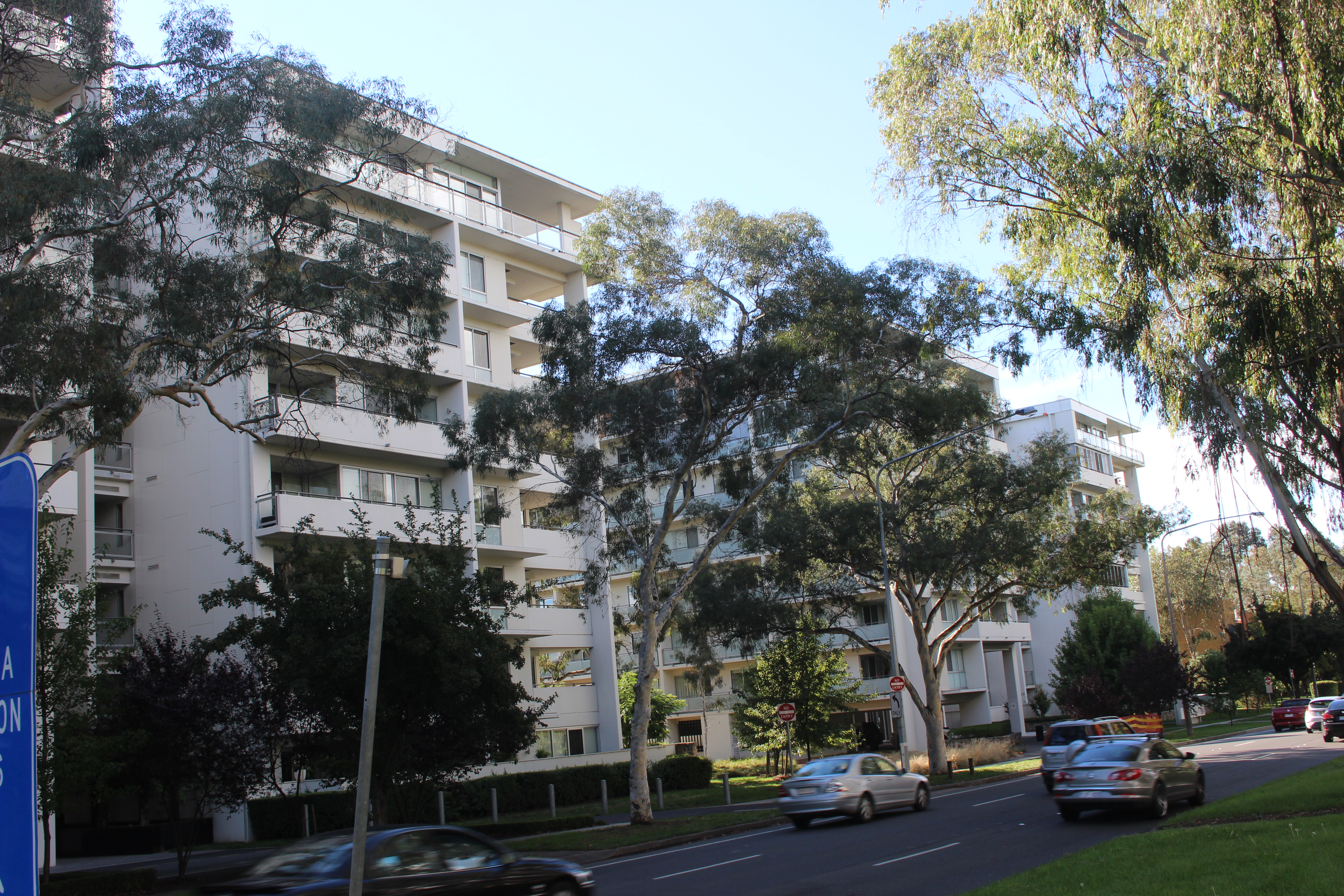
Apartments on Northbourne Avenue

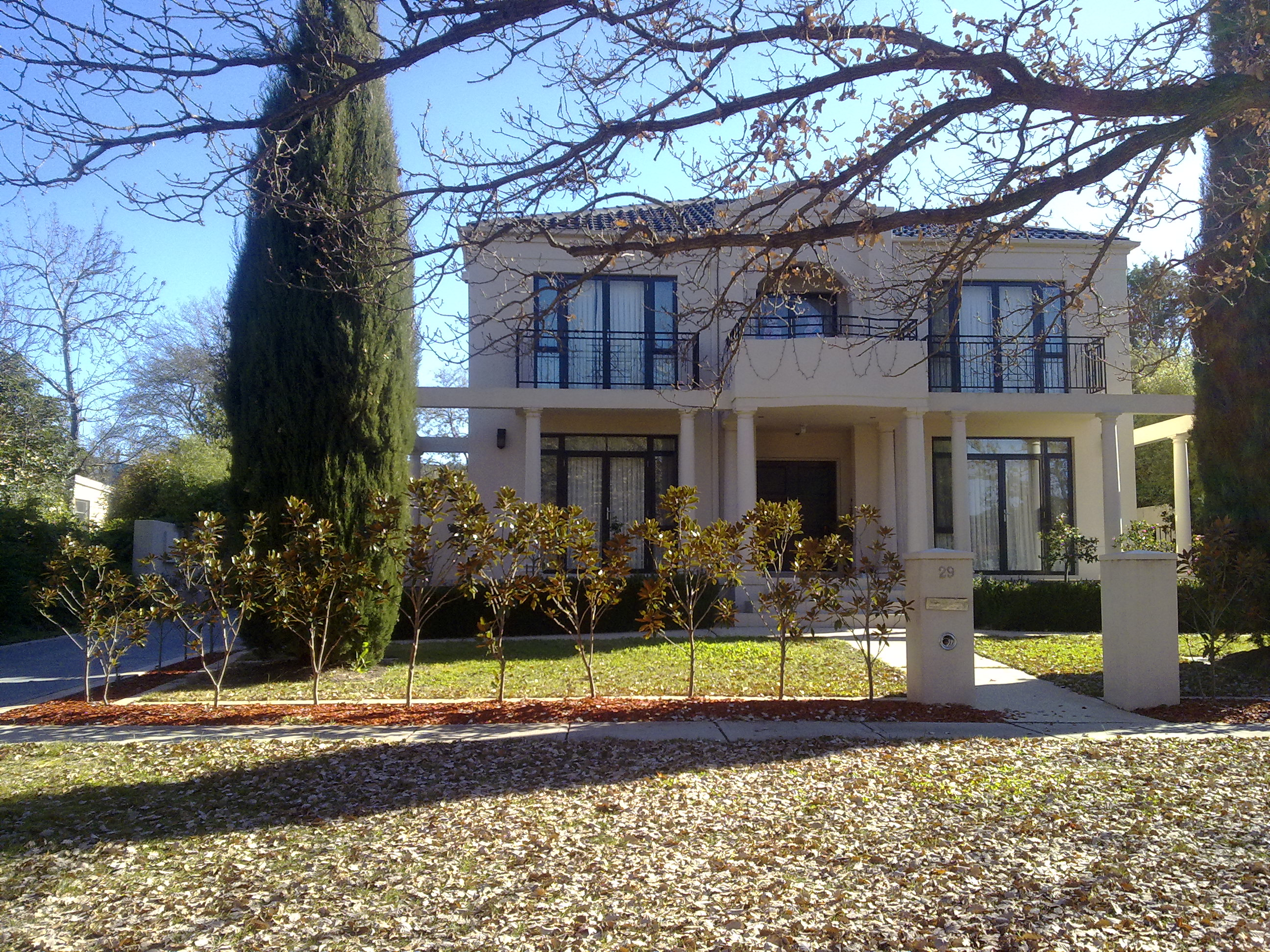
A recently constructed double storied home in southern Turner

Turner was developed in the 1940s and 1950s. The suburb is an example of garden city design with wide nature strips and generously proportioned roads.

Turner, though a small suburb, can be divided into three logical areas:

- The south east area which is bounded by Northbourne Avenue, Barry Drive, Watson Street (Turner Parkland) and Masson Street (Haig Park). This area was first developed in the 1940s and originally consisted of detached dwellings. Very few of these houses remain after early twenty-first century redevelopment, the low-density housing having been replaced by medium-density unit blocks.
- The western part which is bounded by Barry Drive, David Street and McCaughey Street consists mainly of detached dwellings.
- The northern part of the suburb which is bounded by Northbourne Avenue, David Street, McCaughey Street and Greenway Street consists of a mixture of detached dwellings, town houses and flats.

David Street which forms Turner's northern boundary is designed to line up with Black Mountain in one direction and Mount Majura in the other direction.

Original block sizes were generous in Turner, ranging from around 800 m^{2} to 1400 m^{2}, with some even reaching 1600 m^{2}. 900–1000 m^{2} is typical. In the postwar period when resources were scarce, disproportionately small houses were built on these large blocks that are now inner city. This has made Turner blocks well suited for redevelopment, whether it be for units, townhouses, dual occupancies or occasional luxury houses. It was quite usual with the original buildings to have tiny three bedroom and even two bedroom houses on the blocks with floor areas of around 85 m^{2} – 110 m^{2}. These houses were not only small but typically had tiny windows and were poorly positioned on the block for solar access – an important consideration in Canberra's cold climate. Houses were typically positioned for aesthetic effect with various ideas like inner-corner semi-detached (Hackett Gardens), facing the corner (Macleay Street) or symmetrical arrangements between the houses (Holder Street).

Few houses remain in their original unextended state. Floor plans of the original government designed and built houses can be obtained from the local planning authorities. Many houses have been replaced by multi-story unit developments. The scale of redevelopment post-2000 has been significant—the population in the suburb has grown from 1,852 people in 2001 to 3,010 in 2006 and 3,595 in 2011.

A number of artifacts of the original design of Turner can still be seen. Firstly, as is typical for Canberra, powerlines are behind the houses so as not to interfere with street trees. Street lamps are low and designed for pedestrians. Several different designs of lamp were installed originally, and examples of each can be still be seen. Some streets have footpaths with the house numbers imprinted on the concrete and red fire hydrants can be seen in some areas. Because the suburb's construction was interrupted by the war, various ideas can be seen in the layout of footpaths. For example, in the southern areas, footpaths cut off the diagonal of the block. McKay Gardens has service lanes, uncharacteristic both of the suburb and the Canberra region.

Many of the single houses between Sullivans Creek and Northbourne Avenue have been replaced by two and three storey flats in recent years as a result of being zoned in the Inner North Precinct. Land adjoining Northbourne Avenue (except Havelock House) is now zoned to permit redevelopment with 25 metre (about 8 storeys) high flats or 32 metres (about 11 storeys) at the corners of Macarthur Avenue with Northbourne Avenue. Low-rise offices are permitted in a small area in the southeast of the suburb around McKay Gardens.

== Suburb amenities ==
Turner has a combined Special-Education and Mainstream Public school situated between David, Hartley and Condamine Streets, with a combined Pre-school. Child-care centres in the suburb include:

- Christopher Robin's Children's Garden (Watson Street)
- Sage Education and Childcare (Moore Street)
- Treehouse in the Park (Ormond Street)

Turner has several churches:

- a Baptist Church (Condamine Street),
- a Ukrainian Orthodox Church (McKay Gardens),
- a Seventh-day Adventist Church (MacLeay Street),
- a Lutheran Church (Watson Street)
- a Friends Meeting House (Quakers Church) (Corner of Bent and Condamine Streets)
- a Korean Full Gospel church meeting at the Baptist church.

It also has a tennis club (in Condamine Street) and lawn bowls club (in McCaughey Street) and several ethnic clubs, a French association (the Alliance Française) (in McCaughey Street) and Polish club (in David Street) and Croatian club (in McCaughey Street). There was a police youth club on Watson Street (relocated to West Belconnen in late 2006 due to costly maintenance issues with the building).

Turner is within walking distance of the CBD and the Australian National University. The suburb adjoins the local O'Connor shops.

== Open space ==
Turner has a high proportion of parks and open space. This is due to a number of factors:

- It contains half of Haig Park – a large park of pine trees originally built as a barrier to reduce dust from affecting the city, when Canberra was still mostly a sheep station.
- It contains a flood/drainage reserve associated with Sullivans Creek which makes up a large portion of parkland.
- It contains several public sports ovals.
- It contains Turner primary school which has a generous oval and open space.
- It contains a Tennis club attached to Haig Park.

== Politics ==
2025 federal election
Labor	45.81%
Greens	30.99%
Liberal	10.35%
Independent	9.58%
2024 ACT election
Labor	37.5%
Greens	23.5%
Liberal	15.9%
Independents for Canberra	14.3%

Turner is located within the federal electorate of Canberra and it is represented by Alicia Payne for the Labor Party. In the ACT Legislative Assembly, Turner is part of the electorate of Kurrajong, which elects five members on the basis of proportional representation, two Labor, one Green, one Liberal and one Independent. Polling place statistics are shown to the right for the Turner polling place at Turner School in the 2025 federal and 2020 ACT elections.

== Geology ==
Calcareous shales from the Canberra Formation are overlain by Quaternary alluvium. This rock is the limestone of the original title of Canberra "Limestone Plains".

Several fault lines pass through Turner including the inactive Acton Fault.
