= Haig Park =

Park in Canberra, Australia

Coordinates: 35.269729°S 149.130471°E

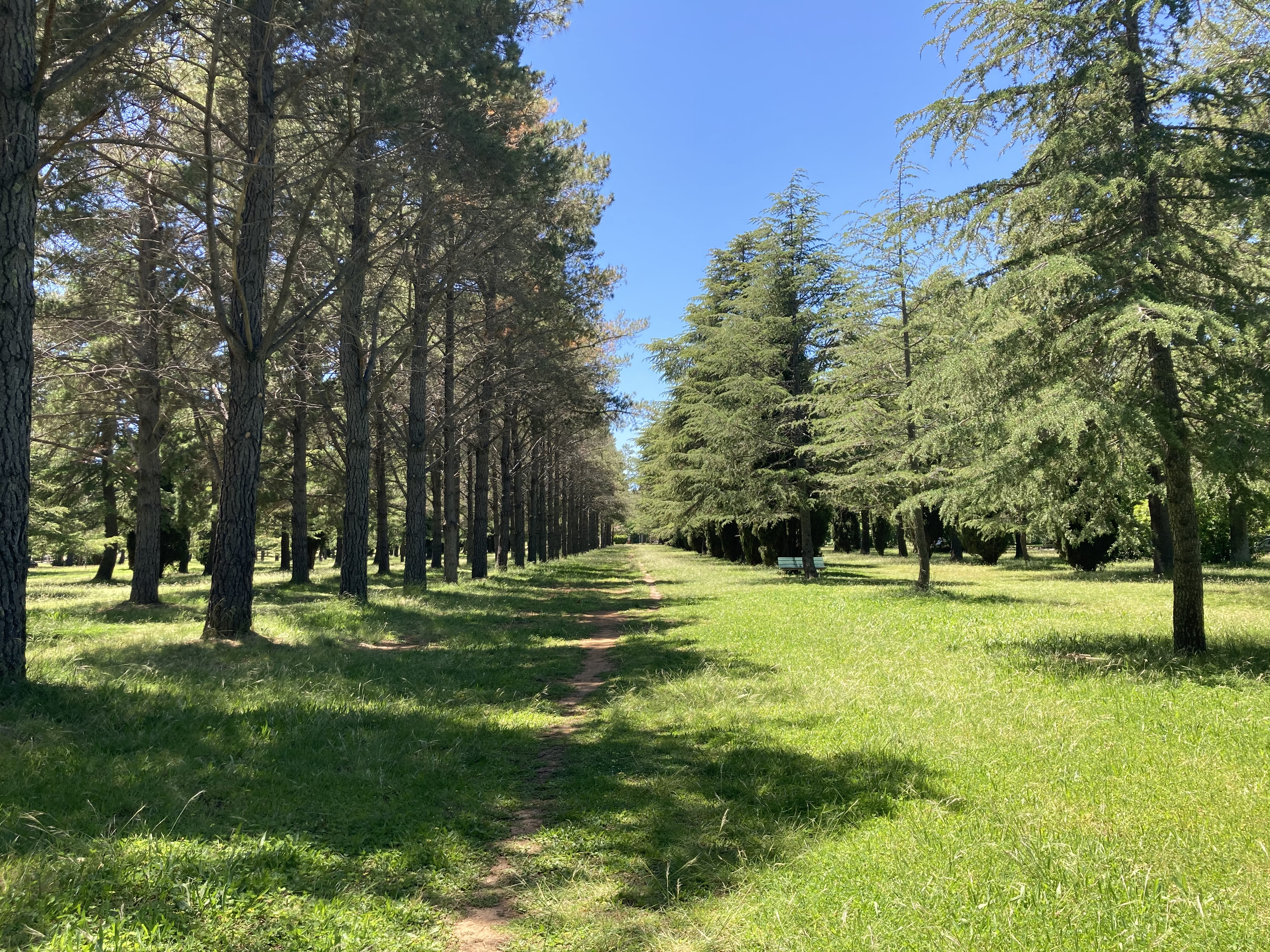
Part of the eastern section of Haig Park

Haig Park is a park in the suburbs of Braddon and Turner in Canberra, Australia. It lies on either side of Northbourne Avenue.

The park is named to honour Earl Haig, the Commander-in-Chief of the British Expeditionary Forces during the First World War, spans the distance between Mount Ainslie and Black Mountain. The park comprises fourteen rows of trees planted to form a windbreak and shelterbelt. The majority of planting was in 1921, when Canberra's first Superintendent, Parks and Gardens, Charles Weston, planted over 7000 trees, predominantly exotic.

According to the ACT Territory and Municipal Services Directorate, the park was designated a public park in 1987 and it has been classified by the National Trust. The park is also listed on the ACT Heritage register.

In 2018 the ACT City Renewal Authority released a long-term plan for the park: the Haig Park Place Plan.
