= Tom McKenna =

Tom McKenna may refer to:

- Tom McKenna (footballer, born 1891) (1891–1974), Irish footballer
- Tom McKenna (footballer, born 1919) (1919–2008), Scottish footballer
- Tom McKenna (town planner) (1925–1977), Australian planner, instrumental to the development of Adelaide and Canberra
- Tom McKenna, a character in the comic A History of Violence

== See also ==
- Thomas McKenna
