= Callam Offices =

Office complex in Canberra, Australia

- The Callam Offices in 2026

General information
- Architectural style: Late Twentieth-Century Structuralist
- Location: Phillip, Australian Capital Territory, Australia
- Coordinates: 35°20′35″S 149°05′21″E
- Construction started: 1977
- Completed: 1981
- Cost: A$9 million (1981); A$44.4 million (2025, adjusted for inflation)
- Client: National Capital Development Commission

Technical details
- Floor count: 3

Design and construction
- Architect: John Andrews
- Structural engineer: Ove Arup & Partners

The Callam Offices are an office complex in Canberra, Australia, designed by Australian architect John Andrews and known for its distinct late twentieth-century structuralist architectural style. The complex is located in the Woden Town Centre in the suburb of Phillip and was designed for the National Capital Development Commission (NCDC). The complex was initially planned to be a "megastructure" consisting of 26 suspended office "pods"; however, only three such units were realised. The offices were constructed between 1977 and 1981 and are one of several office complexes commissioned by the NCDC in the 1960s and '70s. Upon completion, the offices initially served as the Woden TAFE College and have since hosted a variety of clients including departments of the ACT Government.

== Overview ==
Andrews’ design firm, John Andrews International, was commissioned by the NCDC after the 1971 Canberra Flood which claimed the lives of 7 people and injured a further 15 people. In response, design work began in 1973 on the Woden Government Offices or East Woden Offices, an expansive complex consisting of 26 suspended or "floating" office pods for the accommodation of government offices. The complex was to be suspended over the Yarralumla Creek floodplain. Construction was set to begin in 1975, however that year the project was cancelled after the federal government cut funding. Following this, the project was partially revived as the NCDC commissioned three of the office pods to accommodate the Woden TAFE College, and this construction took place between 1977 and 1981 as the Callam Offices, costing A$9 million.

Andrews also designed the Cameron Offices in Belconnen, which alongside the original Callam Offices design concept were two products of the NCDC’s commissioning of a number of modular "mega-structure" complexes in Canberra - the other projects including the Edmund Barton Building, the (now demolished) McLachlan Offices, and the Benjamin Offices (also demolished). These complexes were built with the intention of being government office buildings and each exemplify combinations of international, structuralist, and brutalist design.

The complex has hosted various government and community occupants, but has been empty since its last tenants left in mid-2025.

== Structure ==
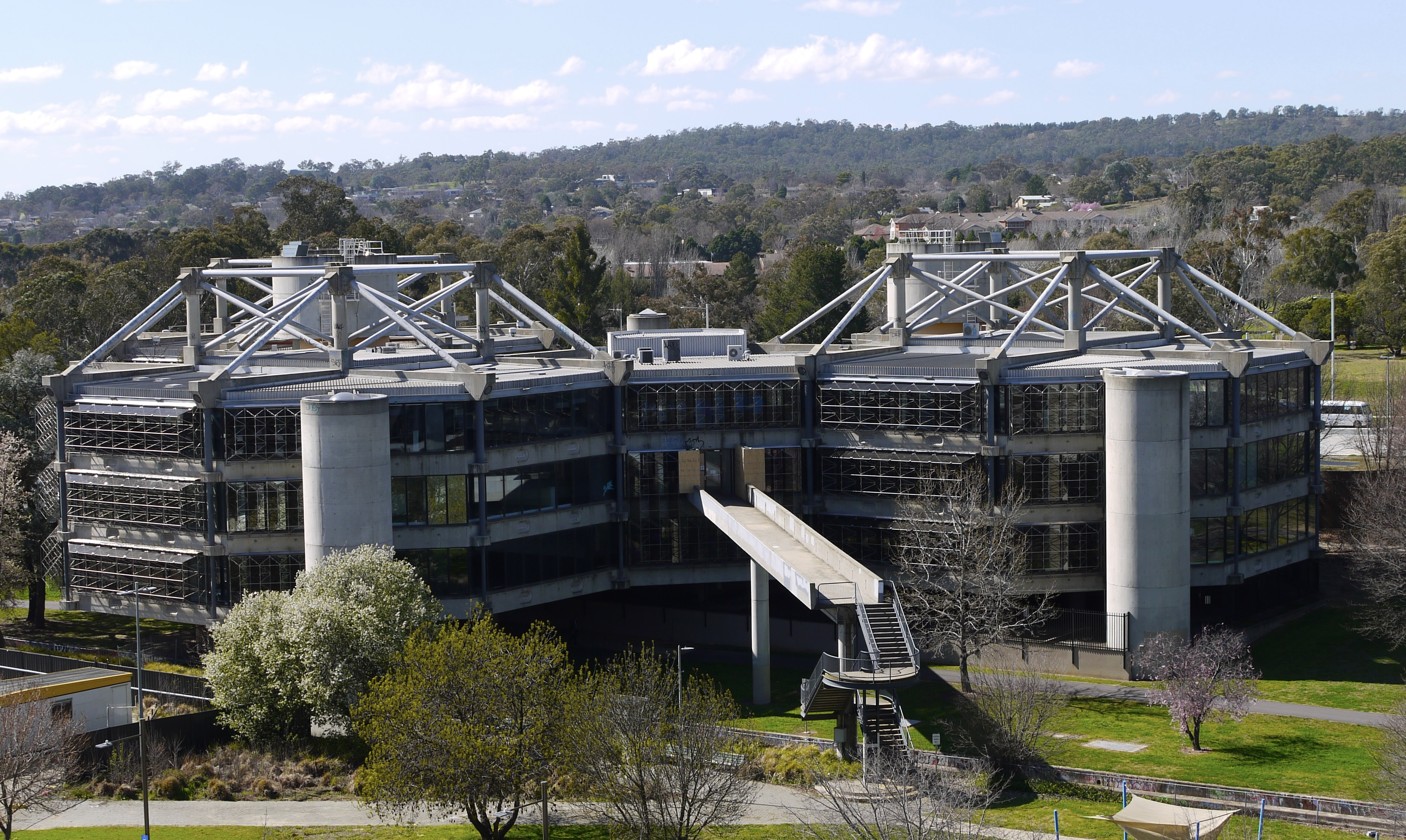
The complex in September 2026

The Callam Offices exist as a modular system of structural elements, including office pods, service towers, and a central transition structure, among other elements.

The three office pods are connected to accompanying structures, as described in a heritage listing document by the Australian Institute of Architects:

The complex as constructed includes one transition space; one central circular lift and stair well tower; three circular service towers; two circular concrete fire-stair towers; one open link lobby; one mid-level open walkway either side of the central lift and stair tower, and two enclosed elevated links either side of the central lift and stair tower.

The structural system of the complex is architecturally and technically unique, and has been described as Australia's first and only known example of an office building's entire perimeter structure being supported by suspension cables. This system is made up of several elements typical of the structuralist style, including compression masts, cable stay structures of triangular form supporting roofs and floors, a reinforced-concrete support structure, and enclosed anchor points of post-tensioned cables.

== Legacy ==
Design elements and concepts used by Andrews for the Callam Offices were reintroduced in later projects of his. His design for 3400 International Drive (Intelsat Headquarters) in Washington, D.C. can be considered a derivation of the Callam Offices plan, as it also involves "pods" with similar size and octagonal geometry, as well as circulation towers and walkways.

Environmental systems and considerations, as well as an octagonal pod concept were also carried into Andrews' design of the Octagon office complex in Parramatta, New South Wales.

The Callam Offices were added to the Australian Institute of Architects Register of Significant Twentieth Century Architecture in 2005, and to the statutory ACT Heritage Register in 2008, affording it legal protection.

== Gallery ==
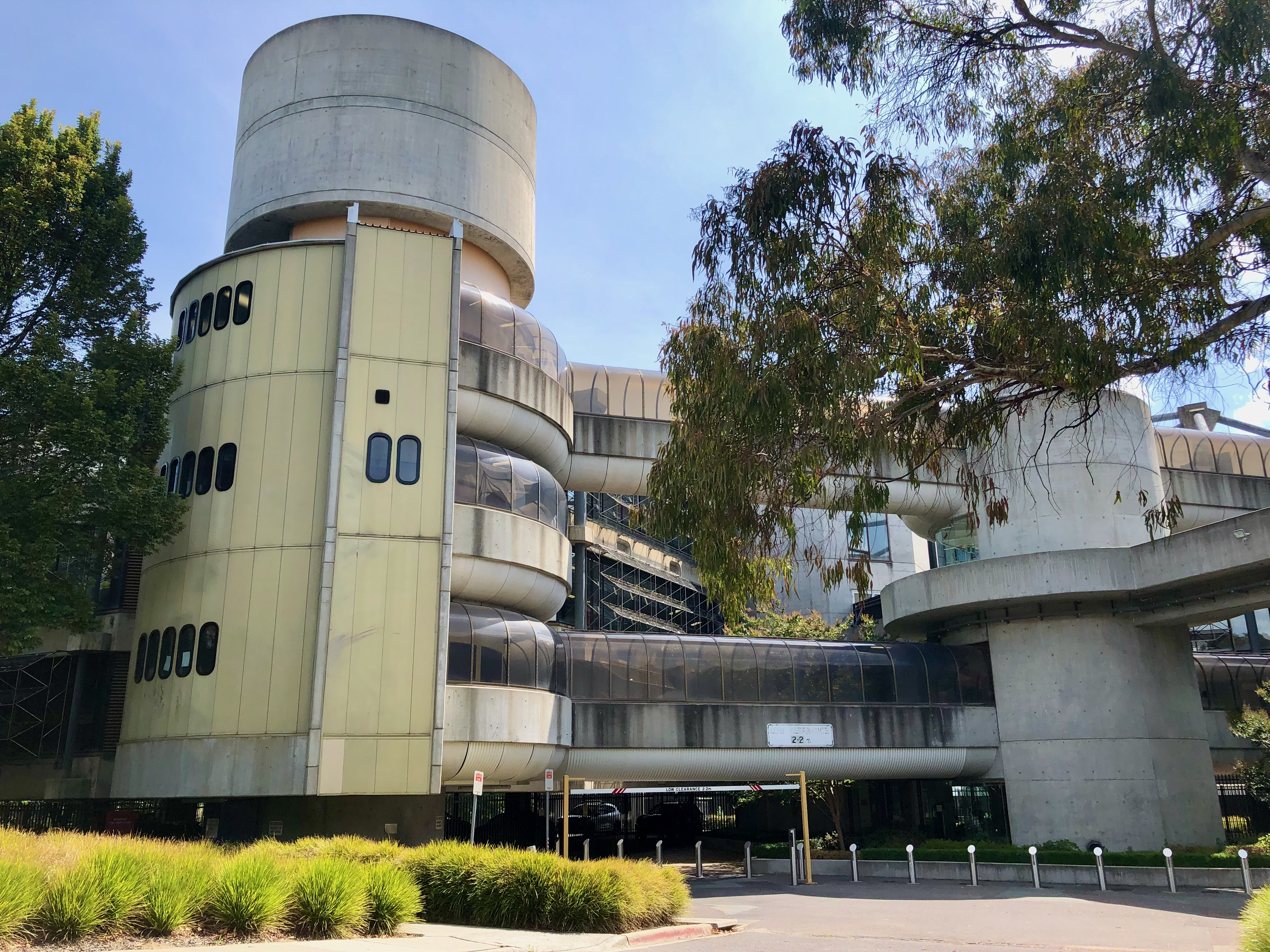
The view from the carpark adjacent to Easty street

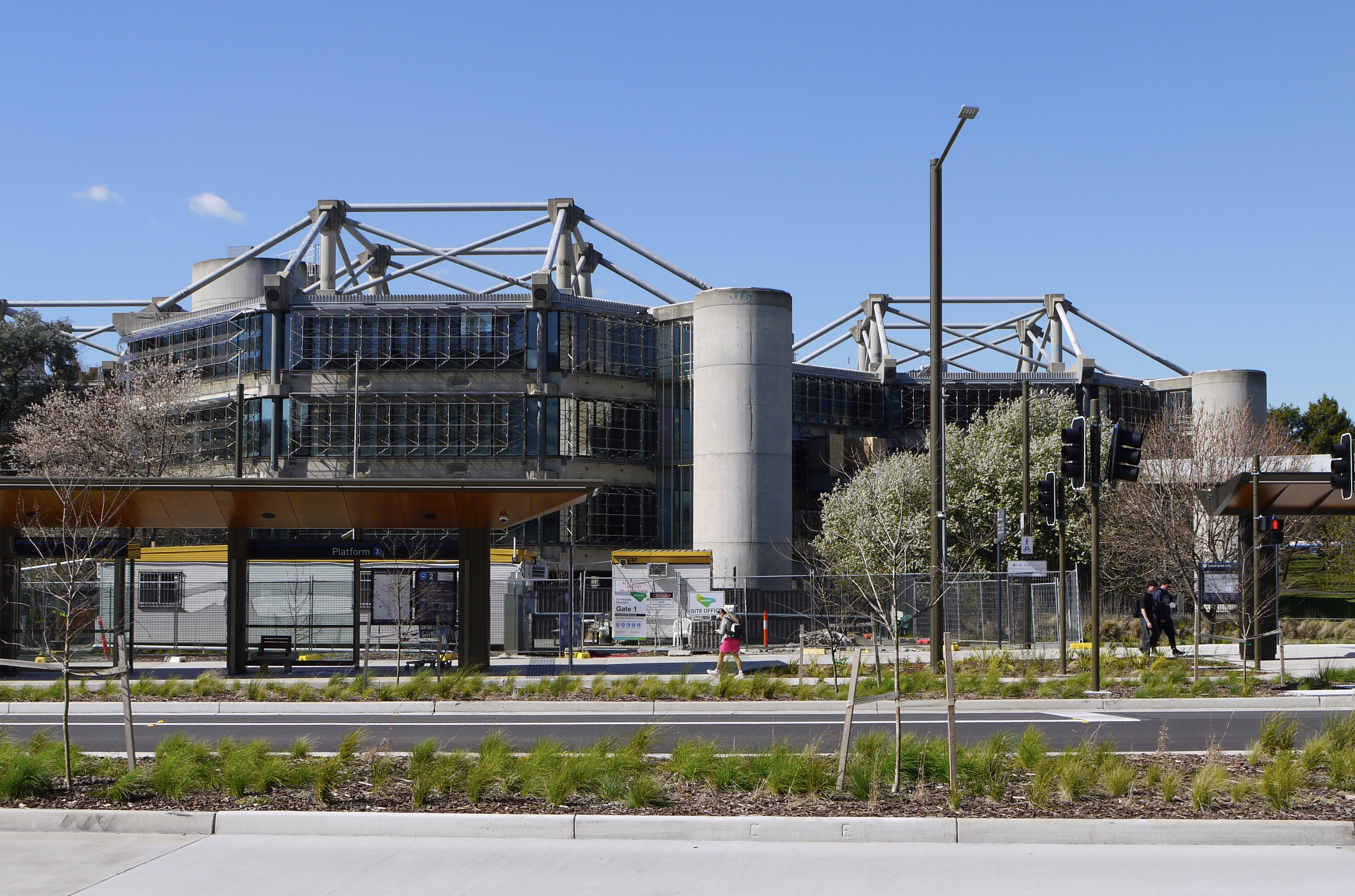
The complex behind the Woden Interchange

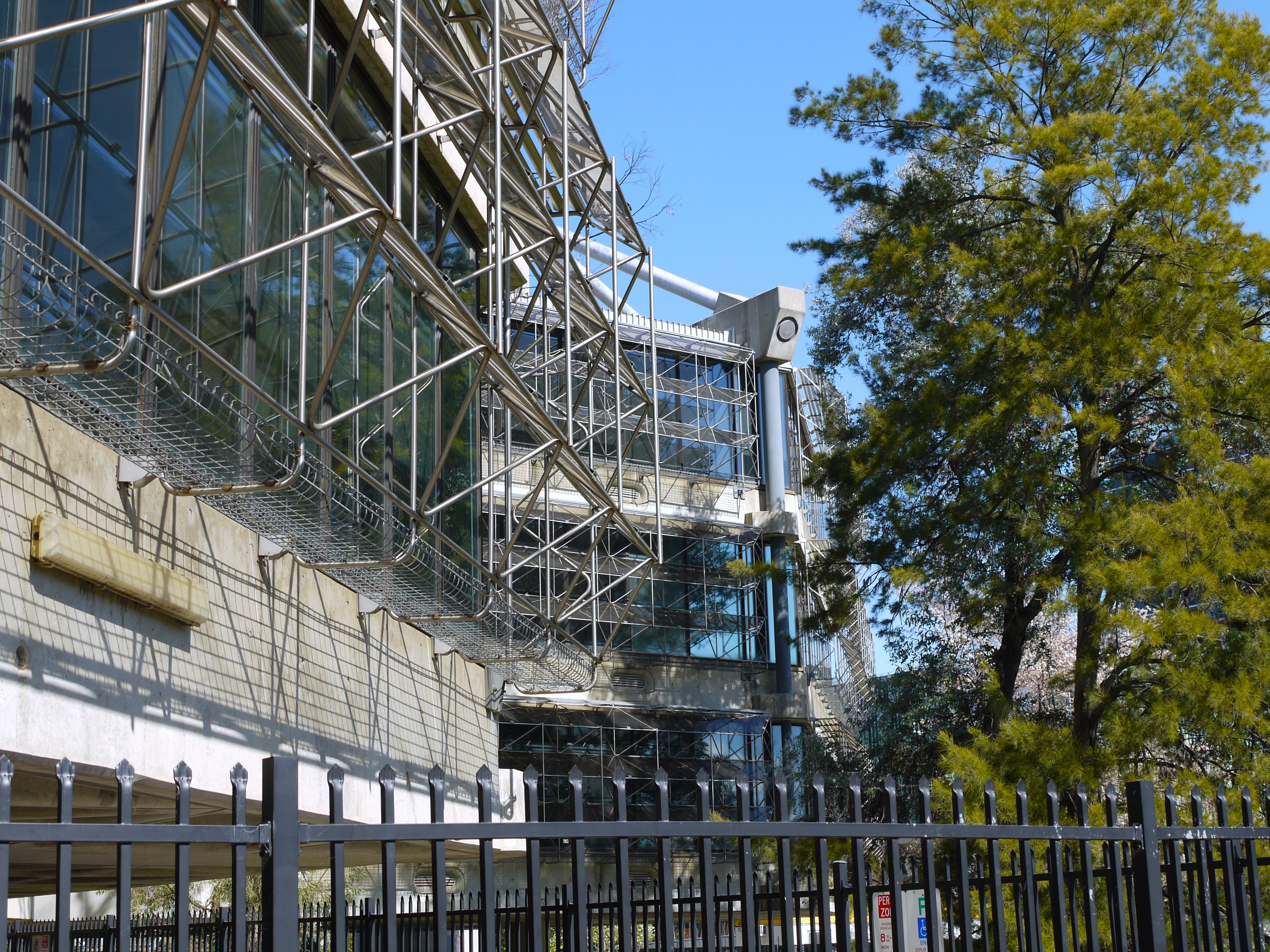
The north-east face of the complex

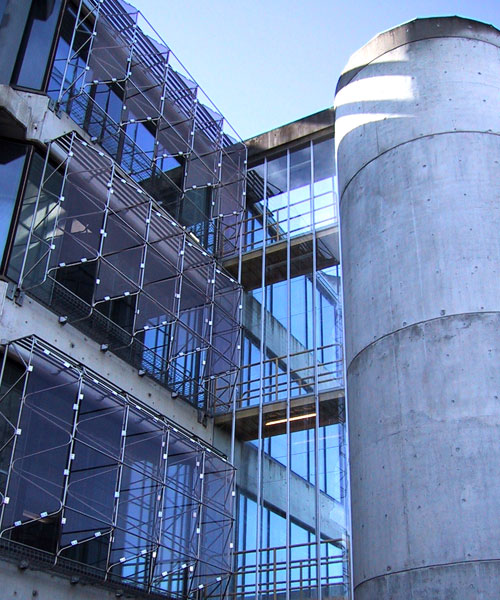
A fire-stair tower

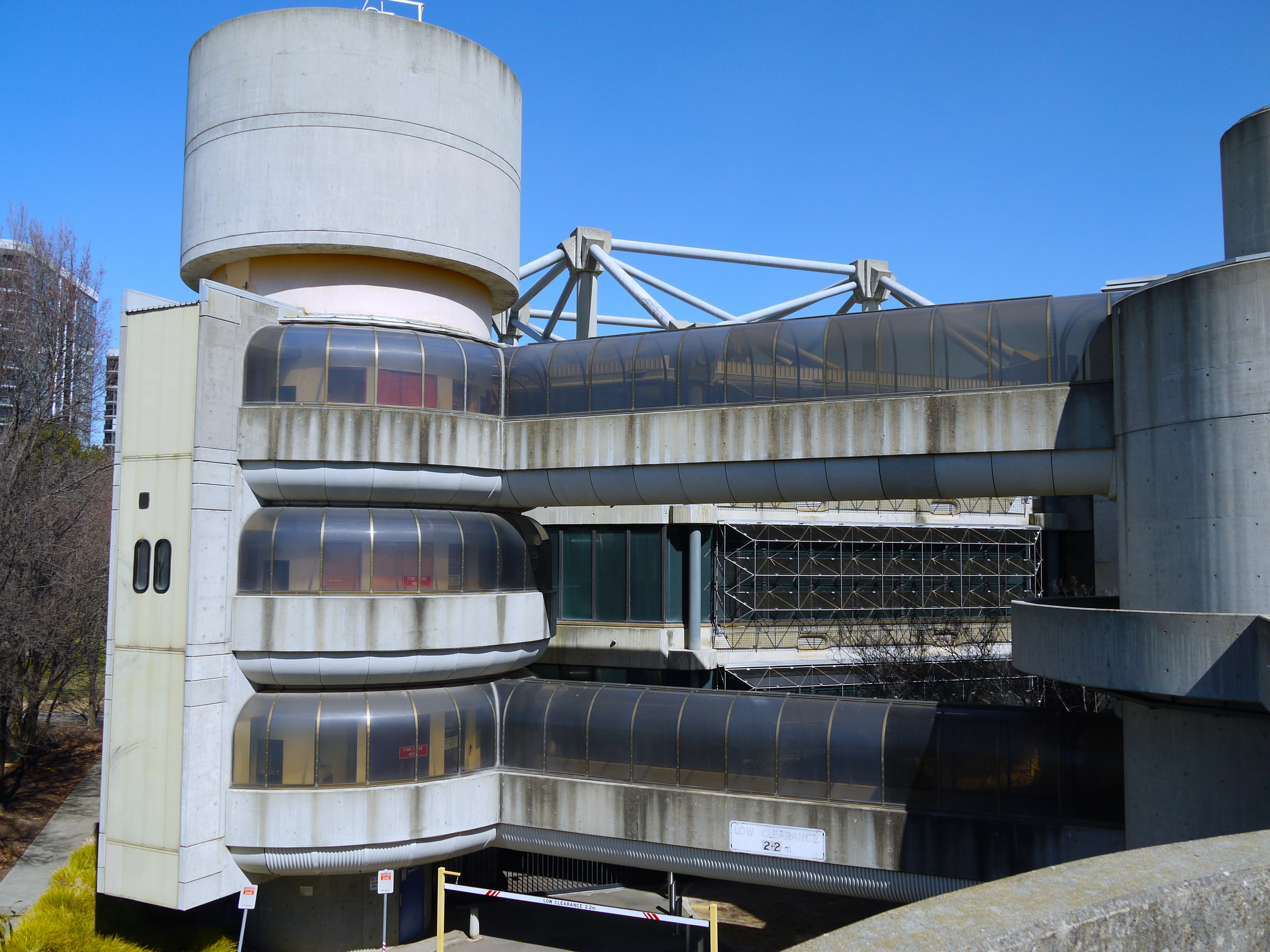
A service tower and two of its links

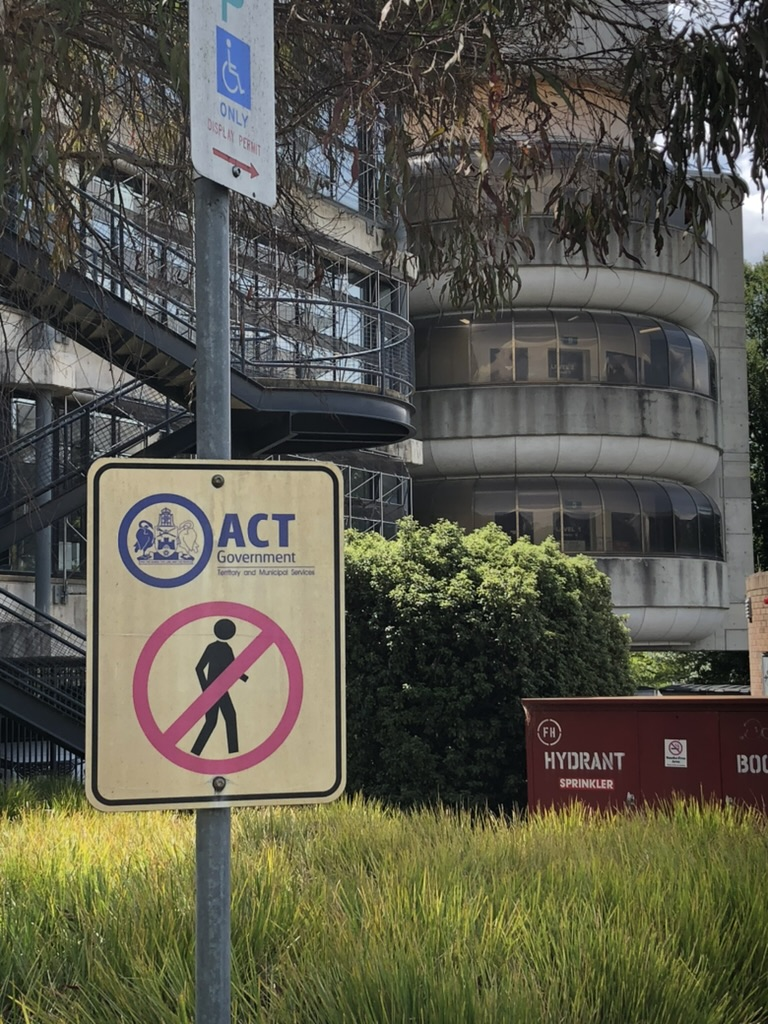
A service tower viewed from the carpark

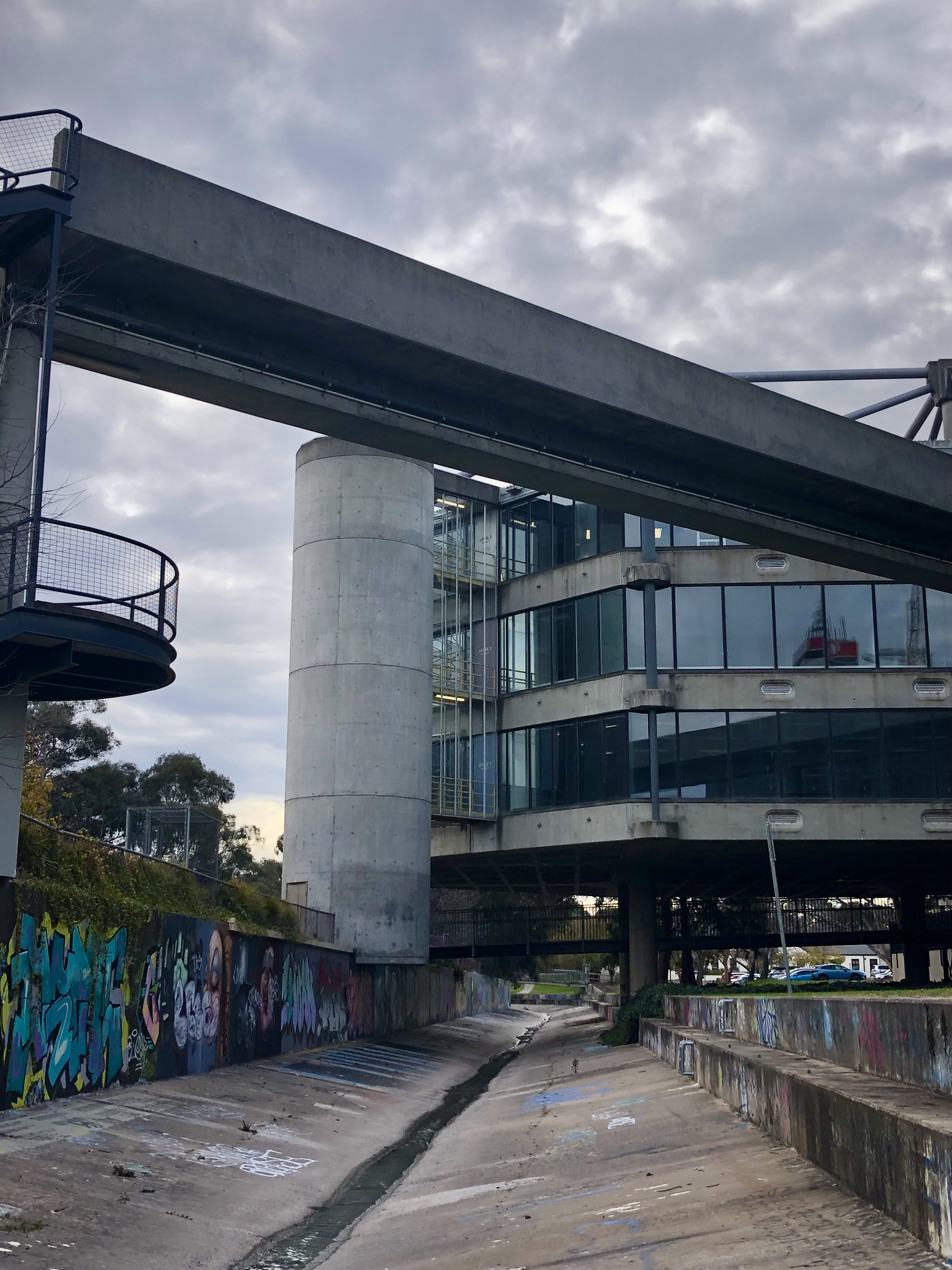
An office pod, fire-stair tower, and elevated walkway over Yarralumla Creek

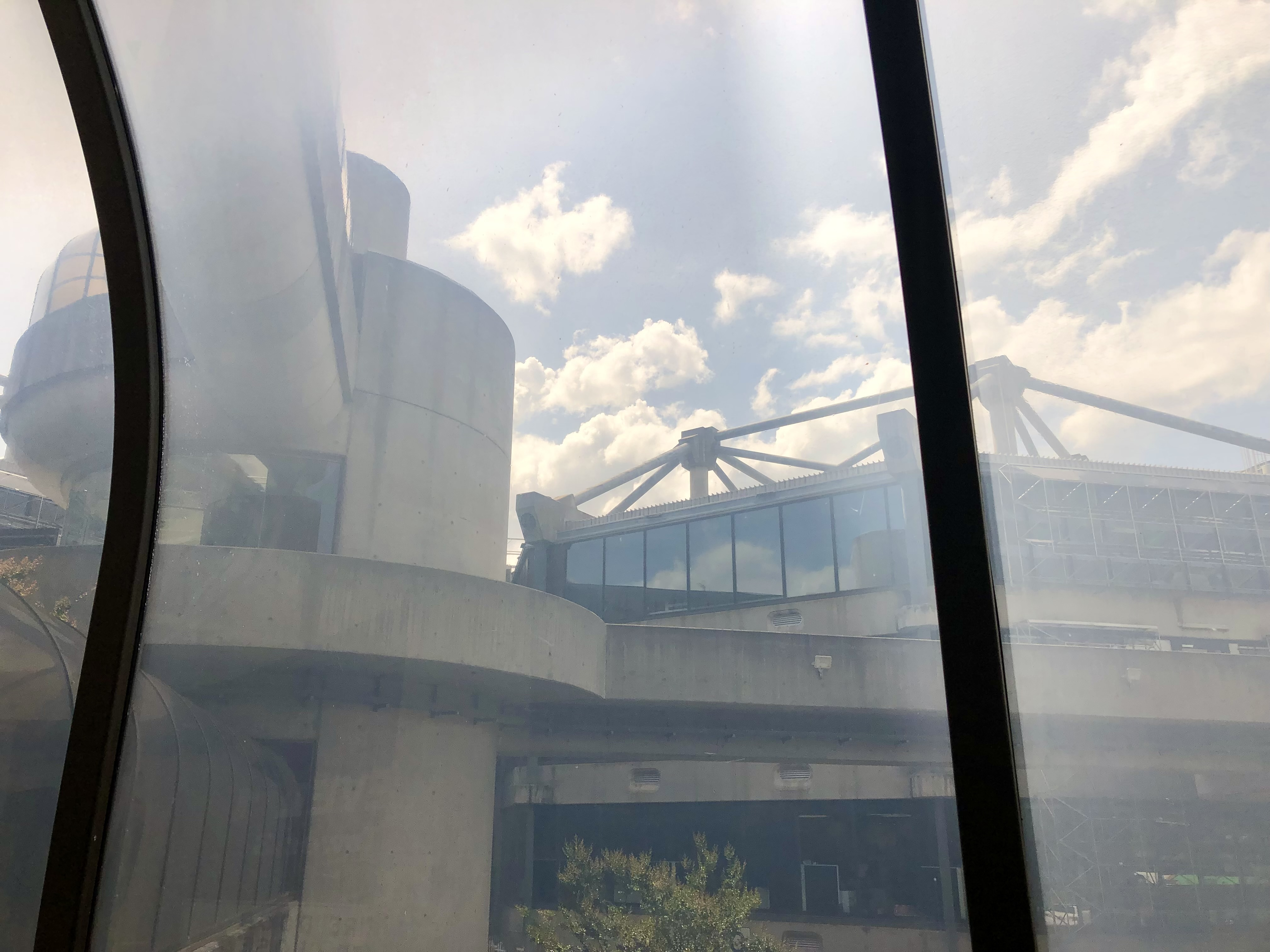
An internal view from the first floor in a service tower
