= List of ordinances of the Australian Capital Territory from 1988 =

This is a list of ordinances enacted by the Governor-General of Australia for the Australian Capital Territory for the year 1988.

== 1988 ==
Short title, or popular name	Citation	Notified
Long title
Canberra Institute of the Arts Ordinance 1988 (Note: This is a reserved law and cannot be amended or repealed by the Legislative Assembly of the Australian Capital Territory.) (repealed)	No. 1 of 1988	5 February 1988
An Ordinance to establish an Institute of Arts in the Australian Capital Territory. (Repealed by Australian National University Act 1991 (No. 131 (Cth)))
Schools Authority (Amendment) Ordinance 1988 or the Schools Authority (Amendment) Act 1988 (repealed)	No. 2 of 1988	10 February 1988
An Ordinance to amend the Schools Authority Ordinance 1976. (Note: Schools Authority Ordinance 1976 (No. 59)) (Repealed by Statute Law Amendment Act 2000 (No. 80))
Parole (Amendment) Ordinance 1988 or the Parole (Amendment) Act 1988 (repealed)	No. 3 of 1988	4 March 1988
An Ordinance to amend the Parole Ordinance 1976. (Note: Parole Ordinance 1976 (No. 29)) (Repealed by Statute Law Amendment Act 2000 (No. 80))
Adoption of Children (Amendment) Ordinance 1988 or the Adoption of Children (Amendment) Act 1988 (repealed)	No. 4 of 1988	9 March 1988
An Ordinance to amend the Adoption of Children Ordinance 1965. (Note: Adoption of Children Ordinance 1965 (No. 15)) (Repealed by Adoption Act 1993 (No. 20))
Agents (Amendment) Ordinance 1988 or the Agents (Amendment) Act 1988 (repealed)	No. 5 of 1988	9 March 1988
An Ordinance to amend the Agents Ordinance 1968. (Note: Agents Ordinance 1968 (No. 26)) (Repealed by Statute Law Amendment Act 2000 (No. 80))
Taxation (Administration) (Amendment) Ordinance 1988 or the Taxation (Administration) (Amendment) Act 1988 (repealed)	No. 6 of 1988	9 March 1988
An Ordinance to amend the Taxation (Administration) Ordinance 1987. (Note: Taxation (Administration) Ordinance 1987 (No. 41)) (Repealed by Taxation Administration (Consequential and Transitional Provisions) Act 1999 (No. 5))
Air Pollution (Amendment) Ordinance 1988 or the Air Pollution (Amendment) Act 1988 (repealed)	No. 7 of 1988	9 March 1988
An Ordinance to amend the Air Pollution Ordinance 1984. (Note: Air Pollution Ordinance 1984 (No. 59)) (Repealed by Environment Protection (Consequential Provisions) Act 1997 (No. 93))
Water Pollution (Amendment) Ordinance 1988 or the Water Pollution (Amendment) Act 1988 (repealed)	No. 8 of 1988	9 March 1988
An Ordinance to amend the Water Pollution Ordinance 1984. (Note: Water Pollution Ordinance 1984 (No. 65)) (Repealed by Environment Protection (Consequential Provisions) Act 1997 (No. 93))
Motor Traffic (Amendment) Ordinance 1988 or the Motor Traffic (Amendment) Act 1988 (repealed)	No. 9 of 1988	9 March 1988
An Ordinance to amend the Motor Traffic Ordinance 1936. (Note: Motor Traffic Ordinance 1936 (No. 45)) (Repealed by Road Transport Legislation Amendment Act 1999 (No. 79))
Motor Traffic (Amendment) Ordinance (No. 2) 1988 or the Motor Traffic (Amendment) Act (No. 2) 1988 (repealed)	No. 10 of 1988	9 March 1988
An Ordinance to amend the Motor Traffic Ordinance 1936. (Repealed by Road Transport Legislation Amendment Act 1999 (No. 79))
Motor Traffic (Amendment) Ordinance (No. 3) 1988 or the Motor Traffic (Amendment) Act (No. 3) 1988 (repealed)	No. 11 of 1988	9 March 1988
An Ordinance to amend the Motor Traffic Ordinance 1936. (Repealed by Road Transport Legislation Amendment Act 1999 (No. 79))
Motor Omnibus Services (Amendment) Ordinance 1988 or the Motor Omnibus Services (Amendment) Act 1988 (repealed)	No. 12 of 1988	9 March 1988
An Ordinance to amend the Motor Omnibus Services Ordinance 1955. (Note: Motor Omnibus Services Ordinance 1955 (No. 12)) (Repealed by Road Transport Legislation Amendment Act 2001 (No. 27))
Plumbers, Drainers and Gasfitters Board (Amendment) Ordinance 1988 or the Plumbers, Drainers and Gasfitters Board (Amendment) Act 1988 (repealed)	No. 13 of 1988	23 March 1988
An Ordinance to amend the Plumbers, Drainers and Gasfitters Board Ordinance 1982. (Note: Plumbers, Drainers and Gasfitters Board Ordinance 1982 (No. 74)) (Repealed by Statute Law Amendment Act 2000 (No. 80))
Classification of Publications (Amendment) Ordinance 1988 (repealed)	No. 14 of 1988	23 March 1988
An Ordinance to amend the Classification of Publications Ordinance 1983. (Note: Classification of Publications Ordinance 1983 (No. 59)) (Repealed by Classification (Publications, Films and Computer Games) Act 1995 (No. 7 (Cth)))
Motor Traffic (Amendment) Ordinance (No. 4) 1988 or the Motor Traffic (Amendment) Act (No. 4) 1988 (repealed)	No. 15 of 1988	14 April 1988
An Ordinance to amend the Motor Traffic Ordinance 1936. (Repealed by Road Transport Legislation Amendment Act 1999 (No. 79))
Motor Traffic (Amendment) Ordinance (No. 5) 1988 or the Motor Traffic (Amendment) Act (No. 5) 1988 (repealed)	No. 16 of 1988	14 April 1988
An Ordinance to amend the Motor Traffic Ordinance 1936. (Repealed by Road Transport Legislation Amendment Act 1999 (No. 79))
Administrative Arrangements (Consequential Amendments) Ordinance 1988 or the Administrative Arrangements (Consequential Amendments) Act 1988 (repealed)	No. 17 of 1988	22 April 1988
An Ordinance to amend certain Ordinances of the Territory in consequence of revised administrative arrangements. (Repealed by Statute Law Amendment Act 2000 (No. 80))
Children's Services (Amendment) Ordinance 1988 or the Children's Services (Amendment) Act 1988 (repealed)	No. 18 of 1988	22 April 1988
An Ordinance to amend the Children's Services Ordinance 1986. (Note: Children's Services Ordinance 1986 (No. 13)) (Repealed by Children and Young People (Consequential Amendments) Act 1999 (No. 64))
Meat (Amendment) Ordinance 1988 or the Meat (Amendment) Act 1988 (repealed)	No. 19 of 1988	4 May 1988
An Ordinance to amend the Meat Ordinance 1931. (Note: Meat Ordinance 1931 (No. 13)) (Repealed by Statute Law Amendment Act 2000 (No. 80))
Motor Traffic (Amendment) Ordinance (No. 6) 1988 or the Motor Traffic (Amendment) Act (No. 6) 1988 (repealed)	No. 20 of 1988	4 May 1988
An Ordinance to amend the Motor Traffic Ordinance 1936. (Repealed by Road Transport Legislation Amendment Act 1999 (No. 79))
Financial Institutions Duty (Amendment) Ordinance 1988 or the Financial Institutions Duty (Amendment) Act 1988 (repealed)	No. 21 of 1988	4 May 1988
An Ordinance to amend the Financial Institutions Duty Ordinance 1987. (Note: Financial Institutions Duty Ordinance 1987 (No. 43)) (Repealed by Statute Law Amendment Act 2000 (No. 80))
Long Service Leave (Building and Construction Industry) (Amendment) Ordinance 1988 or the Long Service Leave (Building and Construction Industry) (Amendment) Act 1988 (repealed)	No. 22 of 1988	18 May 1988
An Ordinance to amend the Long Service Leave (Building and Construction Industry) Ordinance 1981. (Note: Long Service Leave (Building and Construction Industry) Ordinance 1981 (No. 23)) (Repealed by Statute Law Amendment Act 2000 (No. 80))
Stock Diseases (Amendment) Ordinance 1988 or the Stock Diseases (Amendment) Act 1988 (repealed)	No. 23 of 1988	18 May 1988
An Ordinance to amend the Stock Diseases Ordinance 1933. (Note: Stock Diseases Ordinance 1933 (No. 23)) (Repealed by Animal Diseases Act 1993 (No. 61))
Foreign Judgments (Reciprocal Enforcement) (Amendment) Ordinance 1988 or the Foreign Judgments (Reciprocal Enforcement) (Amendment) Act 1988 (repealed)	No. 24 of 1988	8 June 1988
An Ordinance to amend the Foreign Judgments (Reciprocal Enforcement) Ordinance 1954. (Note: Foreign Judgments (Reciprocal Enforcement) Ordinance 1954 (No. 11)) (Repealed by Statute Law Revision Act 1994 (No. 26))
Gaming Machine (Amendment) Ordinance 1988 or the Gaming Machine (Amendment) Act 1988 (repealed)	No. 25 of 1988	30 June 1988
An Ordinance to amend the Gaming Machine Ordinance 1987. (Note: Gaming Machine Ordinance 1987 (No. 34)) (Repealed by Statute Law Amendment Act 2000 (No. 80))
Gaming Machine (Amendment) Ordinance (No. 2) 1988 or the Gaming Machine (Amendment) Act (No. 2) 1988 (repealed)	No. 26 of 1988	30 June 1988
An Ordinance to amend the Gaming Machine Ordinance 1987. (Repealed by Statute Law Amendment Act 2000 (No. 80))
Liquor (Amendment) Ordinance 1988 or the Liquor (Amendment) Act 1988 (repealed)	No. 27 of 1988	30 June 1988
An Ordinance to amend the Liquor Ordinance 1975. (Note: Liquor Ordinance 1975 (No. 19)) (Repealed by Statute Law Amendment Act 2000 (No. 80))
Community and Health Service (Amendment) Ordinance 1988 or the Community and Health Service (Amendment) Act 1988 (repealed)	No. 28 of 1988	30 June 1988
An Ordinance to amend the Health Authority Ordinance 1985. (Note: Health Authority Ordinance 1985 (No. 69)) (Repealed by Statute Law Revision (Miscellaneous Provisions) Act 1993 (No. 1))
Community and Health Service (Consequential Provisions) Ordinance 1988 or the Community and Health Service (Consequential Provisions) Act 1988 (repealed)	No. 29 of 1988	30 June 1988
An Ordinance to make certain amendments consequent upon the making of the Community and Health Service (Amendment) Ordinance 1988. (Note: Community and Health Service (Amendment) Ordinance 1988 (No. 28)) (Repealed by Statute Law Revision (Miscellaneous Provisions) Act 1993 (No. 1))
Electricity and Water Ordinance 1988 or the Electricity and Water Act 1988 (repealed)	No. 30 of 1988	30 June 1988
An Ordinance to establish an Electricity and Water Authority for the Australian Capital Territory and for related purposes. (Repealed by Utilities Act 2000 (No. 65))
Electricity and Water (Consequential Amendments) Ordinance 1988 or the Electricity and Water (Consequential Amendments) Act 1988 (repealed)	No. 31 of 1988	30 June 1988
An Ordinance to amend certain Ordinances of the Territory in consequence of the Electricity and Water Ordinance 1988. (Note: Electricity and Water Ordinance 1988 (No. 30)) (Repealed by Statute Law Amendment Act 2000 (No. 80))
Payroll Tax (Amendment) Ordinance 1988 or the Payroll Tax (Amendment) Act 1988 (repealed)	No. 32 of 1988	30 June 1988
An Ordinance to amend the Payroll Tax Ordinance 1987. (Note: Payroll Tax Ordinance 1987 (No. 40)) (Repealed by Statute Law Amendment Act 2000 (No. 80))
Taxation (Administration) (Amendment) Ordinance (No. 2) 1988 or the Taxation (Administration) (Amendment) Act (No. 2) 1988 (repealed)	No. 33 of 1988	30 June 1988
An Ordinance to amend the Taxation (Administration) Ordinance 1987. (Repealed by Taxation Administration (Consequential and Transitional Provisions) Act 1999 (No. 5))
Administration and Probate (Amendment) Ordinance 1988 or the Administration and Probate (Amendment) Act 1988 (repealed)	No. 34 of 1988	6 July 1988
An Ordinance to amend the Administration and Probate Ordinance 1929. (Note: Administration and Probate Ordinance 1929 (No. 18)) (Repealed by Statute Law Amendment Act 2000 (No. 80))
Classification of Publications (Amendment) Ordinance (No. 2) 1988 (repealed)	No. 35 of 1988	6 July 1988
An Ordinance to amend the Classification of Publications Ordinance 1983 and for other purposes. (Repealed by Classification (Publications, Films and Computer Games) Act 1995 (No. 7 (Cth)))
Interpretation (Amendment) Ordinance 1988 or the Interpretation (Amendment) Act 1988 (repealed)	No. 36 of 1988	6 July 1988
An Ordinance to amend the Interpretation Ordinance 1967. (Note: Interpretation Ordinance 1967 (No. 48)) (Repealed by Statute Law Amendment Act 2000 (No. 80))
Business Franchise (Tobacco and Petroleum Products) (Amendment) Ordinance 1988 or the Business Franchise (Tobacco and Petroleum Products) (Amendment) Act 1988 (repealed)	No. 37 of 1988	13 July 1988
An Ordinance to amend the Business Franchise (Tobacco and Petroleum Products) Ordinance 1984. (Note: Business Franchise (Tobacco and Petroleum Products) Ordinance 1984 (No. 38)) (Repealed by Tobacco Amendment Act 2000 (No. 16))
Canberra Institute of the Arts (Amendment) Ordinance 1988 (repealed)	No. 38 of 1988	13 July 1988
An Ordinance to amend the Canberra Institute of the Arts Ordinance 1988. (Note: Canberra Institute of the Arts Ordinance 1988 (No. 1)) (Repealed by Australian National University Act 1991 (No. 131 (Cth))
Parole (Amendment) Ordinance (No. 2) 1988 or the Parole (Amendment) Act (No. 2) 1988 (repealed)	No. 39 of 1988	13 July 1988
An Ordinance to amend the Parole Ordinance 1976. (Repealed by Statute Law Amendment Act 2000 (No. 80))
Co-operative Societies (Amendment) Ordinance 1988 or the Co-operative Societies (Amendment) Act 1988 (repealed)	No. 40 of 1988	13 July 1988
An Ordinance to amend the Co-operative Societies Ordinance 1939. (Note: Co-operative Societies Ordinance 1939 (No. 9)) (Repealed by Statute Law Amendment Act 2000 (No. 80))
Legal Aid (Amendment) Ordinance 1988 or the Legal Aid (Amendment) Act 1988 (repealed)	No. 41 of 1988	20 July 1988
An Ordinance to amend the Legal Aid Ordinance 1977. (Note: Legal Aid Ordinance 1977 (No. 31)) (Repealed by Statute Law Amendment Act 2000 (No. 80))
Prevention of Cruelty to Animals (Amendment) Ordinance 1988 or the Prevention of Cruelty to Animals (Amendment) Act 1988 (repealed)	No. 42 of 1988	20 July 1988
An Ordinance to amend the Prevention of Cruelty to Animals Ordinance 1959. (Note: Prevention of Cruelty to Animals Ordinance 1959 (No. 16)) (Repealed by Animal Welfare Act 1992 (No. 45))
Canberra Theatre Trust (Amendment) Ordinance 1988 or the Canberra Theatre Trust (Amendment) Act 1988 (repealed)	No. 43 of 1988	20 July 1988
An Ordinance to amend the Canberra Theatre Trust Ordinance 1965. (Note: Canberra Theatre Trust Ordinance 1965 (No. 7)) (Repealed by Cultural Facilities Corporation Act 1997 (No. 48))
Crimes (Amendment) Ordinance 1988 or the Crimes (Amendment) Act 1988 (repealed)	No. 44 of 1988	27 July 1988
An Ordinance to amend the Crimes Act, 1900 (Note: Crimes Act 1900 (No. 40 (NSW))) of the State of New South Wales in its application to the Territory. (Repealed by Statute Law Amendment Act 2000 (No. 80))
Magistrates Court (Amendment) Ordinance 1988 or the Magistrates Court (Amendment) Act 1988 (repealed)	No. 45 of 1988	27 July 1988
An Ordinance to amend the Magistrates Court Ordinance 1930. (Note: Magistrates Court Ordinance 1930 (No. 21)) (Repealed by Statute Law Amendment Act 2000 (No. 80))
Co-operative Societies (Amendment) Ordinance (No. 2) 1988 or the Co-operative Societies (Amendment) Act (No. 2) 1988 (repealed)	No. 46 of 1988	3 August 1988
An Ordinance to amend the Co-operative Societies Ordinance 1939. (Repealed by Statute Law Amendment Act 2000 (No. 80))
Agents (Amendment) Ordinance (No. 2) 1988 or the Agents (Amendment) Act (No. 2) 1988 (repealed)	No. 47 of 1988	3 August 1988
An Ordinance to amend the Agents Ordinance 1968. (Repealed by Statute Law Amendment Act 2000 (No. 80))
Education (Amendment) Ordinance 1988 or the Education (Amendment) Act 1988 (repealed)	No. 48 of 1988	3 August 1988
An Ordinance to amend the Education Ordinance 1937. (Note: Education Ordinance 1937 (No. 25)) (Repealed by Statute Law Amendment Act 2000 (No. 80))
Long Service Leave (Building and Construction Industry) (Amendment) Ordinance (No. 2) 1988 or the Long Service Leave (Building and Construction Industry) (Amendment) Act (No. 2) 1988 (repealed)	No. 49 of 1988	3 August 1988
An Ordinance to amend the Long Service Leave (Building and Construction Industry) Ordinance 1981. (Repealed by Statute Law Amendment Act 2000 (No. 80))
Remuneration (Amendment) Ordinance 1988 (repealed)	No. 50 of 1988	3 August 1988
An Ordinance to amend the Remuneration Ordinance 1976. (Note: Remuneration Ordinance 1976 (No. 62)) (Repealed by Remuneration (Repeal) Ordinance 1989 (No. 49))
Remand Centres (Amendment) Ordinance 1988 or the Remand Centres (Amendment) Act 1988 (repealed)	No. 51 of 1988	10 August 1988
An Ordinance to amend the Remand Centres Ordinance 1976. (Note: Remand Centres Ordinance 1976 (No. 48)) (Repealed by Statute Law Amendment Act 2000 (No. 80))
Legal Practitioners (Amendment) Ordinance 1988 or the Legal Practitioners (Amendment) Act 1988 (repealed)	No. 52 of 1988	10 August 1988
An Ordinance to amend the Legal Practitioners Ordinance 1970. (Note: Legal Practitioners Ordinance 1970 (No. 43)) (Repealed by Statute Law Amendment Act 2000 (No. 80))
Taxation (Administration) (Amendment) Ordinance (No. 3) 1988 or the Taxation (Administration) (Amendment) Act (No. 3) 1988 (repealed)	No. 53 of 1988	7 September 1988
An Ordinance to amend the Taxation (Administration) Ordinance 1987. (Repealed by Taxation Administration (Consequential and Transitional Provisions) Act 1999 (No. 5))
Taxation (Administration) (Amendment) Ordinance (No. 4) 1988 or the Taxation (Administration) (Amendment) Act (No. 4) 1988 (repealed)	No. 54 of 1988	7 September 1988
An Ordinance to amend the Taxation (Administration) Ordinance 1987. (Repealed by Taxation Administration (Consequential and Transitional Provisions) Act 1999 (No. 5))
Stamp Duties and Taxes (Amendment) Ordinance 1988 or the Stamp Duties and Taxes (Amendment) Act 1988 (repealed)	No. 55 of 1988	7 September 1988
An Ordinance to amend the Stamp Duties and Taxes Ordinance 1987. (Note: Stamp Duties and Taxes Ordinance 1987 (No. 39)) (Repealed by Duties (Consequential and Transitional Provisions) Act 1999 (No. 8))
Stamp Duties and Taxes (Amendment) Ordinance (No. 2) 1988 or the Stamp Duties and Taxes (Amendment) Act (No. 2) 1988 (repealed)	No. 56 of 1988	7 September 1988
An Ordinance to amend the Stamp Duties and Taxes Ordinance 1987. (Repealed by Duties (Consequential and Transitional Provisions) Act 1999 (No. 8))
Electricity and Water (Amendment) Ordinance 1988 or the Electricity and Water (Amendment) Act 1988 (repealed)	No. 57 of 1988	7 September 1988
An Ordinance to amend the Electricity and Water Ordinance 1988. (Note: Electricity and Water Ordinance 1988 (No. 30)) (Repealed by Statute Law Amendment Act 2000 (No. 80))
Architects (Amendment) Ordinance 1988 or the Architects (Amendment) Act 1988 (repealed)	No. 58 of 1988	7 September 1988
An Ordinance to amend the Architects Ordinance 1959. (Note: Architects Ordinance 1959 (No. 3)) (Repealed by Statute Law Amendment Act 2000 (No. 80))
Health Professions Boards (Procedures) (Amendment) Ordinance 1988 or the Health Professions Boards (Procedures) (Amendment) Act 1988 (repealed)	No. 59 of 1988	7 September 1988
An Ordinance to amend the Health Professions Boards (Procedures) Ordinance 1981. (Note: Health Professions Boards (Procedures) Ordinance 1981 (No. 46)) (Repealed by Statute Law Amendment Act 2000 (No. 80))
Health Professions Boards (Elections) (Amendment) Ordinance 1988 or the Health Professions Boards (Elections) (Amendment) Act 1988 (repealed)	No. 60 of 1988	7 September 1988
An Ordinance to amend the Health Professions Boards (Elections) Ordinance 1980. (Note: Health Professions Boards (Elections) Ordinance 1980 (No. 45)) (Repealed by Statute Law Amendment Act 2000 (No. 80))
Nurses Ordinance 1988 or the Nurses Act 1988 (repealed)	No. 61 of 1988	7 September 1988
An Ordinance to provide for the registration and enrolment of nurses, the supervision of nursing education and standards, and for related purposes. (Repealed by Health Professionals Act 2004 (A2004-38))
Nurses (Consequential Amendments) Ordinance 1988 or the Nurses (Consequential Amendments) Act 1988 (repealed)	No. 62 of 1988	7 September 1988
An Ordinance to amend certain Ordinances in consequence of the Nurses Ordinance 1988. (Note: Nurses Ordinance 1988 (No. 61)) (Repealed by Statute Law Amendment Act 2000 (No. 80))
Rates and Land Tax (Amendment) Ordinance 1988 or the Rates and Land Tax (Amendment) Act 1988 (repealed)	No. 63 of 1988	7 September 1988
An Ordinance to amend the Rates and Land Tax Ordinance 1926. (Note: Rates and Land Tax Ordinance 1926 (No. 6)) (Repealed by Statute Law Amendment Act 2000 (No. 80))
Long Service Leave (Building and Construction Industry) (Amendment) Ordinance (No. 3) 1988 or the Long Service Leave (Building and Construction Industry) (Amendment) Act (No. 3) 1988 (repealed)	No. 64 of 1988	21 September 1988
An Ordinance to amend the Long Service Leave (Building and Construction Industry) Ordinance 1981. (Repealed by Statute Law Amendment Act 2000 (No. 80))
Schools Authority (Amendment) Ordinance (No. 2) 1988 or the Schools Authority (Amendment) Act (No. 2) 1988 (repealed)	No. 65 of 1988	21 September 1988
An Ordinance to amend the Schools Authority Ordinance 1976. (Repealed by Statute Law Amendment Act 2000 (No. 80))
Housing Assistance (Amendment) Ordinance 1988 or the Housing Assistance (Amendment) Act 1988 (repealed)	No. 66 of 1988	21 September 1988
An Ordinance to amend the Housing Assistance Ordinance 1987. (Note: Housing Assistance Ordinance 1987 (No. 36)) (Repealed by Statute Law Amendment Act 2000 (No. 80))
Lakes (Amendment) Ordinance 1988 or the Lakes (Amendment) Act 1988 (repealed)	No. 67 of 1988	21 September 1988
An Ordinance to amend the Lakes Ordinance 1976. (Note: Lakes Ordinance 1976 (No. 65)) (Repealed by Statute Law Amendment Act 2000 (No. 80))
Traffic (Amendment) Ordinance 1988 or the Traffic (Amendment) Act 1988 (repealed)	No. 68 of 1988	21 September 1988
An Ordinance to amend the Traffic Ordinance 1937. (Note: Traffic Ordinance 1937 (No. 32)) (Repealed by Road Transport Legislation Amendment Act 1999 (No. 79))
Apprenticeship (Amendment) Ordinance 1988 or the Apprenticeship (Amendment) Act 1988 (repealed)	No. 69 of 1988	21 September 1988
An Ordinance to amend the Apprenticeship Ordinance 1936. (Note: Apprenticeship Ordinance 1936 (No. 11)) (Repealed by Vocational Training Act 1989 (No. 2))
Motor Traffic (Amendment) Ordinance (No. 7) 1988 or the Motor Traffic (Amendment) Act (No. 7) 1988 (repealed)	No. 70 of 1988	21 September 1988
An Ordinance to amend the Motor Traffic Ordinance 1936. (Repealed by Road Transport Legislation Amendment Act 1999 (No. 79))
Noise Control Ordinance 1988 or the Noise Control Act 1988 (repealed)	No. 71 of 1988	21 September 1988
An Ordinance to provide for the control of noise. (Repealed by Environment Protection (Consequential Provisions) Act 1997 (No. 93))
Casino Control Ordinance 1988 or the Casino Control Act 1988 (repealed)	No. 72 of 1988	23 September 1988
An Ordinance to provide for the establishment and control of a casino in the Territory. (Repealed by Casino Control Act 2006 (A2006-2))
Building (Amendment) Ordinance 1988 or the Building (Amendment) Act 1988 (repealed)	No. 73 of 1988	30 September 1988
An Ordinance to amend the Building Ordinance 1972. (Note: Building Ordinance 1972 (No. 26)) (Repealed by Statute Law Amendment Act 2000 (No. 80))
Long Service Leave (Building and Construction Industry) (Amendment) Ordinance (No. 4) 1988 or the Long Service Leave (Building and Construction Industry) (Amendment) Act (No. 4) 1988 (repealed)	No. 74 of 1988	19 October 1988
An Ordinance to amend the Long Service Leave (Building and Construction Industry) Ordinance 1981. (Repealed by Statute Law Amendment Act 2000 (No. 80))
Crimes (Amendment) Ordinance (No. 2) 1988 or the Crimes (Amendment) Act (No. 2) 1988 (repealed)	No. 75 of 1988	19 October 1988
An Ordinance to amend the Crimes Act, 1900 of the State of New South Wales in its application to the Territory. (Repealed by Statute Law Amendment Act 2000 (No. 80))
Credit (Amendment) Ordinance 1988 or the Credit (Amendment) Act 1988 (repealed)	No. 76 of 1988	9 November 1988
An Ordinance to amend the Credit Ordinance 1985. (Note: Credit Ordinance 1985 (No. 5)) (Repealed by Statute Law Amendment Act 2000 (No. 80))
Interpretation (Amendment) Ordinance (No. 2) 1988 or the Interpretation (Amendment) Act (No. 2) 1988 (repealed)	No. 77 of 1988	7 December 1988
An Ordinance to amend the Interpretation Ordinance 1967. (Repealed by Statute Law Amendment Act 2000 (No. 80))
Trustee (Amendment) Ordinance 1988 or the Trustee (Amendment) Act 1988 (repealed)	No. 78 of 1988	7 December 1988
An Ordinance to amend the Trustee Ordinance 1957. (Note: Trustee Ordinance 1957 (No. 14)) (Repealed by Statute Law Amendment Act 2000 (No. 80))
Stamp Duties and Taxes (Amendment) Ordinance (No. 3) 1988 or the Stamp Duties and Taxes (Amendment) Act (No. 3) 1988 (repealed)	No. 79 of 1988	14 December 1988
An Ordinance to amend the Stamp Duties and Taxes Ordinance 1987. (Repealed by Duties (Consequential and Transitional Provisions) Act 1999 (No. 8))
Building (Amendment) Ordinance (No. 2) 1988 or the Building (Amendment) Act (No. 2) 1988 (repealed)	No. 80 of 1988	9 December 1988
An Ordinance to amend the Building Ordinance 1972. (Repealed by Statute Law Amendment Act 2000 (No. 80))
Magistrates Court (Civil Jurisdiction) (Amendment) Ordinance 1988 or the Magistrates Court (Civil Jurisdiction) (Amendment) Act 1988 (repealed)	No. 81 of 1988	14 December 1988
An Ordinance to amend the Magistrates Court (Civil Jurisdiction) Ordinance 1982 (Note: Magistrates Court (Civil Jurisdiction) Ordinance 1982 (No. 54)) and for related purposes. (Repealed by Statute Law Amendment Act 2000 (No. 80))
A.C.T. Institute of Technical and Further Education (Amendment) Ordinance 1988 or the A.C.T. Institute of Technical and Further Education (Amendment) Act 1988 (repealed)	No. 82 of 1988	21 December 1988
An Ordinance to amend the A.C.T. Institute of Technical and Further Education Ordinance 1987. (Note: A.C.T. Institute of Technical and Further Education Ordinance 1987 (No. 71)) (Repealed by Statute Law Amendment Act 2000 (No. 80))
Public Baths and Public Bathing (Amendment) Ordinance 1988 or the Public Baths and Public Bathing (Amendment) Act 1988 (repealed)	No. 83 of 1988	19 December 1988
An Ordinance to amend the Public Baths and Public Bathing Ordinance 1956. (Note: Public Baths and Public Bathing Ordinance 1956 (No. 12)) (Repealed by Statute Law Amendment Act 2000 (No. 80))
Dog Control (Amendment) Ordinance 1988 or the Dog Control (Amendment) Act 1988 (repealed)	No. 84 of 1988	19 December 1988
An Ordinance to amend the Dog Control Ordinance 1975. (Note: Dog Control Ordinance 1975 (No. 18)) (Repealed by Domestic Animals Act 2000 (No. 86))
Dental Technicians and Dental Prosthetists Registration Ordinance 1988 or the Dental Technicians and Dental Prosthetists Registration Act 1988 (repealed)	No. 85 of 1988	21 December 1988
An Ordinance to provide for the registration of persons engaged in the performance of dental technical work or the provision of dental prosthetic services and for related purposes. (Repealed by Health Professionals Act 2004 (A2004-38))
Building (Amendment) Ordinance (No. 3) 1988 or the Building (Amendment) Act (No. 3) 1988 (repealed)	No. 86 of 1988	21 December 1988
An Ordinance to amend the Building Ordinance 1972. (Repealed by Statute Law Amendment Act 2000 (No. 80))
Building (Amendment) Ordinance (No. 4) 1988 or the Building (Amendment) Act (No. 4) 1988 (repealed)	No. 87 of 1988	21 December 1988
An Ordinance to amend the Building Ordinance 1972. (Repealed by Statute Law Amendment Act 2000 (No. 80))
Interim Territory Planning Ordinance 1988 or the Interim Territory Planning Act 1988 (repealed)	No. 88 of 1988	21 December 1988
An Ordinance to establish an Interim Territory Planning Authority and for related purposes. (Repealed by Land (Planning and Environment) (Consequential Provisions) Act 1991 (No. 118))
Criminal Injuries Compensation (Amendment) Ordinance 1988 or the Criminal Injuries Compensation (Amendment) Act 1988 (repealed)	No. 89 of 1988	21 December 1988
An Ordinance to amend the Criminal Injuries Compensation Ordinance 1983. (Note: Criminal Injuries Compensation Ordinance 1983 (No. 11)) (Repealed by Statute Law Amendment Act 2000 (No. 80))
Holidays (Amendment) Ordinance 1988 or the Holidays (Amendment) Act 1988 (repealed)	No. 90 of 1988	21 December 1988
An Ordinance to amend the Holidays Ordinance 1958. (Note: Holidays Ordinance 1958 (No. 19)) (Repealed by Statute Law Amendment Act 2000 (No. 80))
Dangerous Goods (Amendment) Ordinance 1988 or the Dangerous Goods (Amendment) Act 1988 (repealed)	No. 91 of 1988	21 December 1988
An Ordinance to amend the Dangerous Goods Ordinance 1984. (Note: Dangerous Goods Ordinance 1984 (No. 4)) (Repealed by Statute Law Amendment Act 2000 (No. 80))
Registration of Births, Deaths and Marriages (Amendment) Ordinance 1988 or the Registration of Births, Deaths and Marriages (Amendment) Act 1988 (repealed)	No. 92 of 1988	21 December 1988
An Ordinance to amend the Registration of Births, Deaths and Marriages Ordinance 1963. (Note: Registration of Births, Deaths and Marriages Ordinance 1963 (No. 17)) (Repealed by Births, Deaths and Marriages Registration Act 1997 (No. 112))
Birth (Equality of Status) Ordinance 1988 or the Birth (Equality of Status) Act 1988 (repealed)	No. 93 of 1988	21 December 1988
An Ordinance to remove the legal disabilities of persons born out of wedlock, to provide for declarations of parentage, and for related purposes. (Repealed by Parentage Act 2004 (A2004-1))
Imperial Acts (Repeal) Ordinance 1988 or the Imperial Acts (Repeal) Act 1988 or the Former UK Acts (Interpretation) Act 1988 (repealed)	No. 94 of 1988	21 December 1988
An Ordinance to repeal certain Acts of the United Kingdom as part of the law of the Territory and for related purposes. (Repealed by Statute Law Amendment Act 2002 (No. 2) (No. 49))
Public Health (Prohibited Drugs) (Amendment) Ordinance 1988 or the Public Health (Prohibited Drugs) (Amendment) Act 1988 (repealed)	No. 95 of 1988	20 December 1988
An Ordinance to amend the Public Health (Prohibited Drugs) Ordinance 1957. (Note: Public Health (Prohibited Drugs) Ordinance 1957 (No. 9)) (Repealed by Statute Law Amendment Act 2000 (No. 80))
Poisons and Narcotic Drugs (Amendment) Ordinance 1988	No. 96 of 1988	20 December 1988
An Ordinance to amend the Poisons and Narcotic Drugs Ordinance 1978. (Note: Poisons and Narcotic Drugs Ordinance 1978 (No. 38))

== Sources ==
- "legislation.act.gov.au".
