= Westfield Woden =

Coordinates: 35.3464°S 149.0868°E

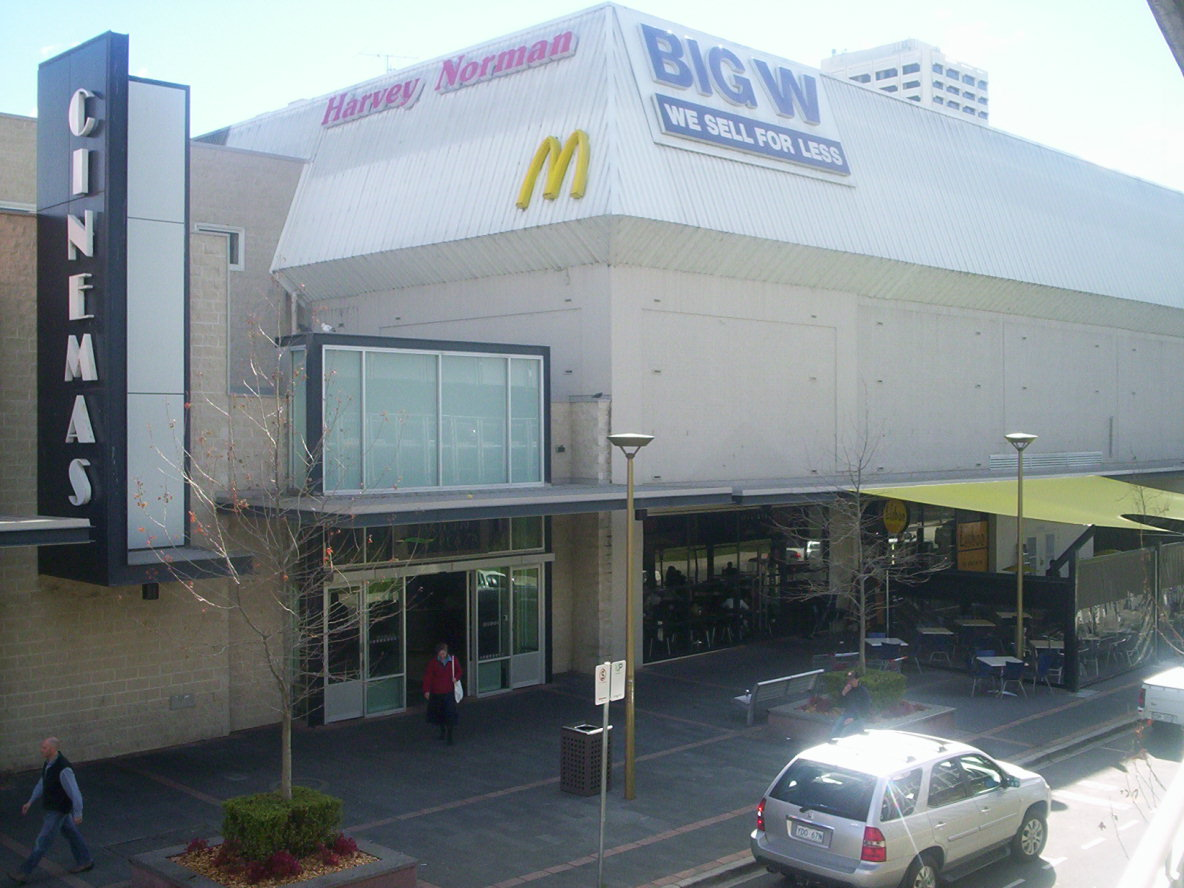
- Viewed from Callam Street multi-storey carpark opposite cinema in 2009.
- Opened: 18 September 1972
- Developer: Lendlease
- Manager: Scentre Group
- Owner: Scentre Group (50%); Perron Group (50%)
- Num. of stores: 266
- Num. of anchor tenants: 4
- Floor area: 62,000 m²
- Floors: 4
- Parking: ~1,500
- Website: www.westfield.com.au/woden

Westfield Woden, formerly Woden Plaza, is a large shopping centre in the Woden Town Centre of Phillip of Canberra, Australian Capital Territory. The centre comprises four anchor tenants – David Jones, Big W, Coles and Woolworths – and more than 250 other retail, leisure, and dining outlets.

== History ==
Woden Plaza was developed by Lendlease. It was opened on 18 September 1972 by Prime Minister William McMahon.

To begin with, the centre's only components were what now houses the Big W and David Jones areas, but, during the 1980s, expanded to include a medium-sized food court.

In 1996, the centre underwent a major redevelopment, adding on a new wing to the building called "The Fresh Food Market" (currently housing Coles and Woolworths) as well as a new Hoyts 8-screen cinema complex. GPT purchased the first, second, and third storeys of the Bonner House building, situated across from the back of the centre, and connect the areas together with a pedestrian bridge.

The Westfield Group purchased a 50% stake in the centre in July 2005, with the remaining 50% retained by GPT. It took over management of the centre from Lendlease on the same date. In December 2015 the Perron Group purchased GPT's shareholding.

In November 2026, David Jones announced that their store in the centre was one of 19 planned store closures after the 2026 holiday season, as a result of their entrance into administration.

== Transport ==
In December 1972 the Woden Interchange, located adjacent to the shopping centre, opened. It was used by ACTION and CDC Canberra bus services until being closed in January 2023 and will be rebuilt on a new site.
