= Woden Town Centre =

Coordinates: 35°20′46″S 149°05′10″E

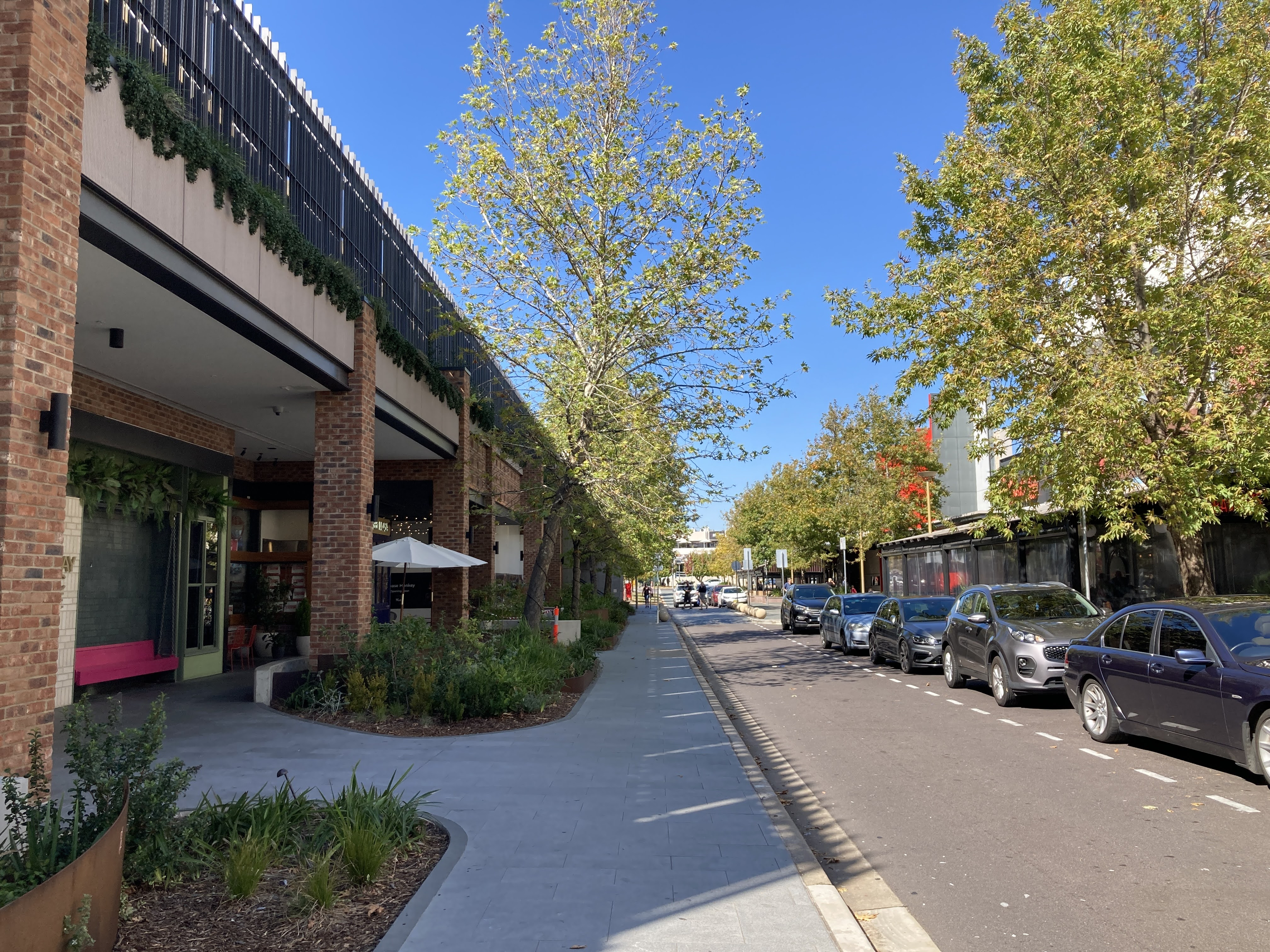
- Bradley Street in April 2021
- Country: Australia
- State: Australian Capital Territory
- City: Woden Valley
- District: Woden Valley
- Established: 1966

Government
  - Territory electorate: Murrumbidgee
  - Federal division: Canberra
- Postcode: 2606

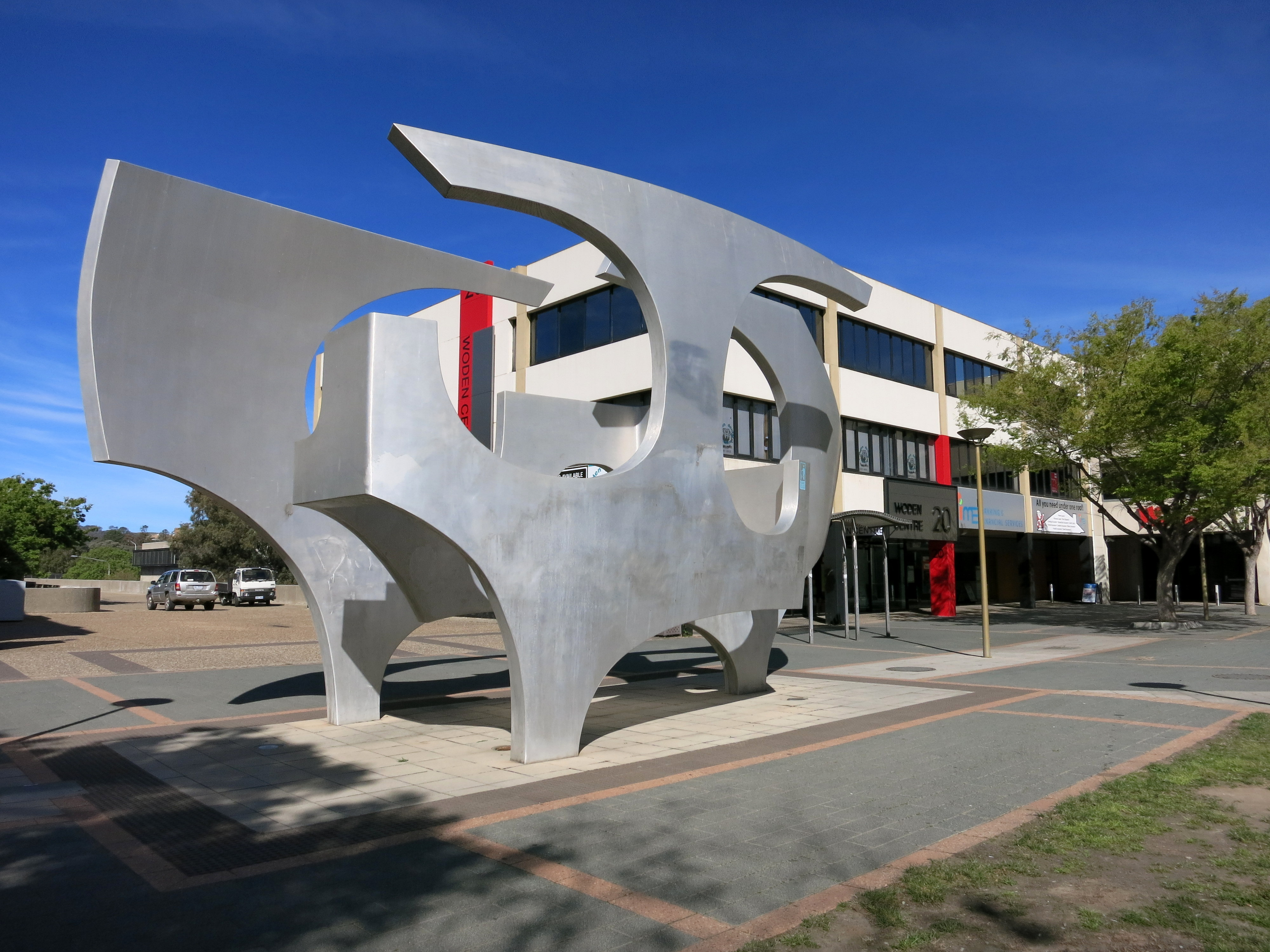
"Sculptured Form" by Margel Hinder (1970)

Woden Town Centre is the town centre of the district of Woden Valley in the Australian Capital Territory. It is located in the suburb of Phillip. The town centre has a variety of shops and amenities, including office blocks that house Australian departments, and shopping centres like Westfield Woden.

Like Phillip, the town centre was established in 1966 and the suburb it is located in was named after Arthur Phillip, who was the first Governor of New South Wales. In 1971, a flash flood caused the deaths of seven people, which occurred right near the Woden Town Centre. The centre is the location of the third tallest building in Canberra, the Lovett Tower (formerly known as the MLC Tower).

== History ==
The Woden Town Centre was established in 1966, following when Phillip was gazetted on 12 May 1966. Like Phillip, except for Swinger Hill, street names in the Woden Town Centre are associated with the First, Second and Third Fleets. Construction began around 1968, when the Fishburn and Sirius buildings, along with the Alexander and Albemarle Buildings were among the first buildings to be built at the centre. On 26 January 1971, a flash flood occurred near the Woden Town Centre, where 95 mm of rain fell in one hour and killed seven people. Woden Plaza was opened on 18 September 1972 by the Prime Minister of Australia, William McMahon.

=== Revitalisation ===
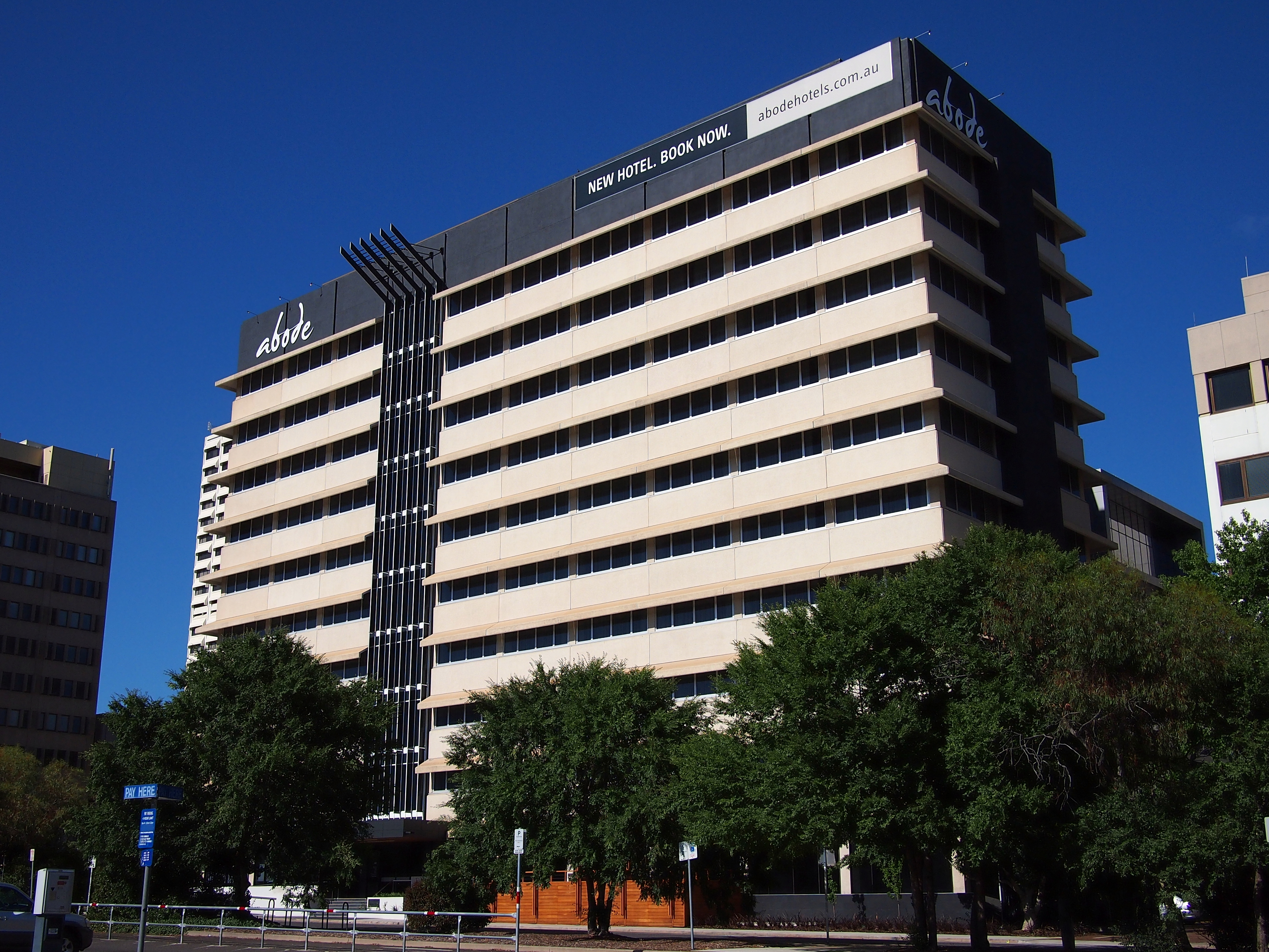
Juliana House, now refurbished as a new apartment hotel

Refurbishments for Scarborough House were considered in the 1990s, which were eventually done several years later. The existing Fishburn and Sirius Buildings were demolished in 2007–08 to make way for a new $67 million development housing some of the offices of the Department of Health & Aged Care. The old Penrhyn House located at 2-6 Bowes Street was sold for $14 million in June 2012. The building, purchased by the boutique property fund manager went through a revamp, treated with a $10 million upgrade, which is expected to bring back 900 public servants to the Woden Town Centre, due to its sustainable space of 12,622 metres square. In 2014, the Juliana House was reopened by Abode Hotels as a hotel, where the office tower, which once housed the Department of Health & Aged Care offices, was closed down and left vacant in 2010. The conversion of the building resulted in the withdrawal of 8,500 square metres of space from the ACT property market. The Alexander and Albemarle buildings were adaptively reused into boutique apartments in 2020.

In 2013, a new bus layover was proposed at the locations of Phillip Oval and the corner of Launceston and Callam Street. This is to improve the flow and efficiency of transportation in the town centre. "Block 13" mentioned in this plan is a desirable site for a new bus layover in the Woden Town Centre. This brings opportunity for the Phillip Oval, for future use and its increase of importance for second tier ground for Cricket and AFL.

An Estate Development Plan was approved for the Woden Town Centre in November 2013. The Woden Town Centre revamp is similar to what happened with the redevelopment at the Belconnen Town Centre, which the redevelopment there resulted in significant urban design improvements. A redevelopment on the Woden Interchange had been considered since 2004, where plans introduced Westfield Woden's development team and its co-owners proposals to upgrade. In 2014, work has been confirmed to begin as early as September, where the former police station next to the interchange is expected to be demolished to make way for new redevelopment. The redevelopment also includes demolishing the existing interchange in replacement for a new building. However, department store chain, Myer has stated they will not have an outlet located in Woden, resulting in some doubts of revitalisation. Woden Interchange closed in January 2023 and was demolished with a new Canberra Institute of Technology campus being built on the site. From 2023, a new bus interchange was built with provision for an extension of the light rail, reopening on 20 April 2026.

== Geology and location ==
The rocks underneath Phillip are from the Silurian period and are from 417 to 414 million years old. Deakin Volcanics green-grey purple coloured rhyodacite can be found in the west half and south east corner of Phillip. Deakin Volcanics purple and green tuff has been observed around Hindmarsh Drive.

The Woden Town Centre is located in Phillip which is in the district of the Woden Valley. The postcode is 2606. The Woden Town Centre neighbours the suburbs of Lyons from the north west, Chifley directly from the west and Pearce from south west, Curtin from north, Hughes from the north east, Garran directly from the east and O'Malley from south east, while Mawson borders from the south.

== Urban structure ==
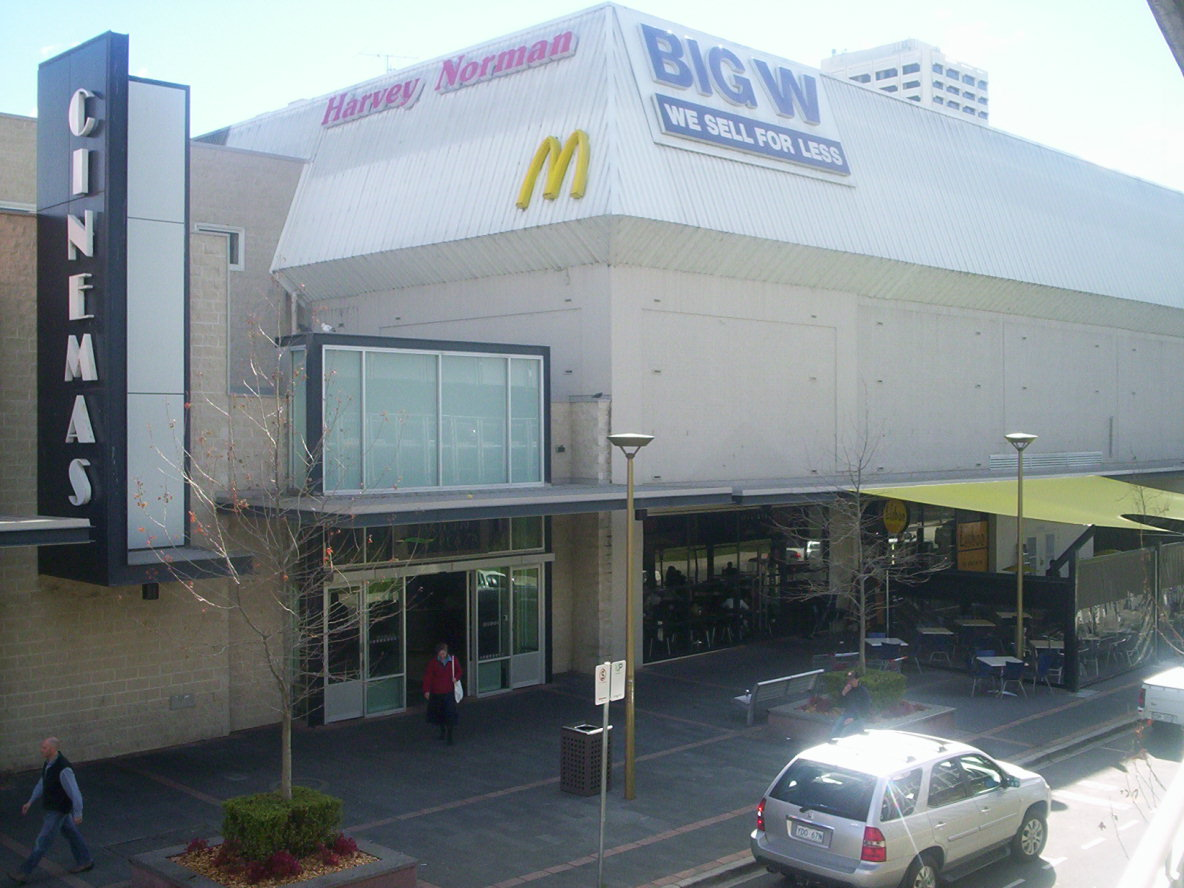
Westfield Woden from the southeast

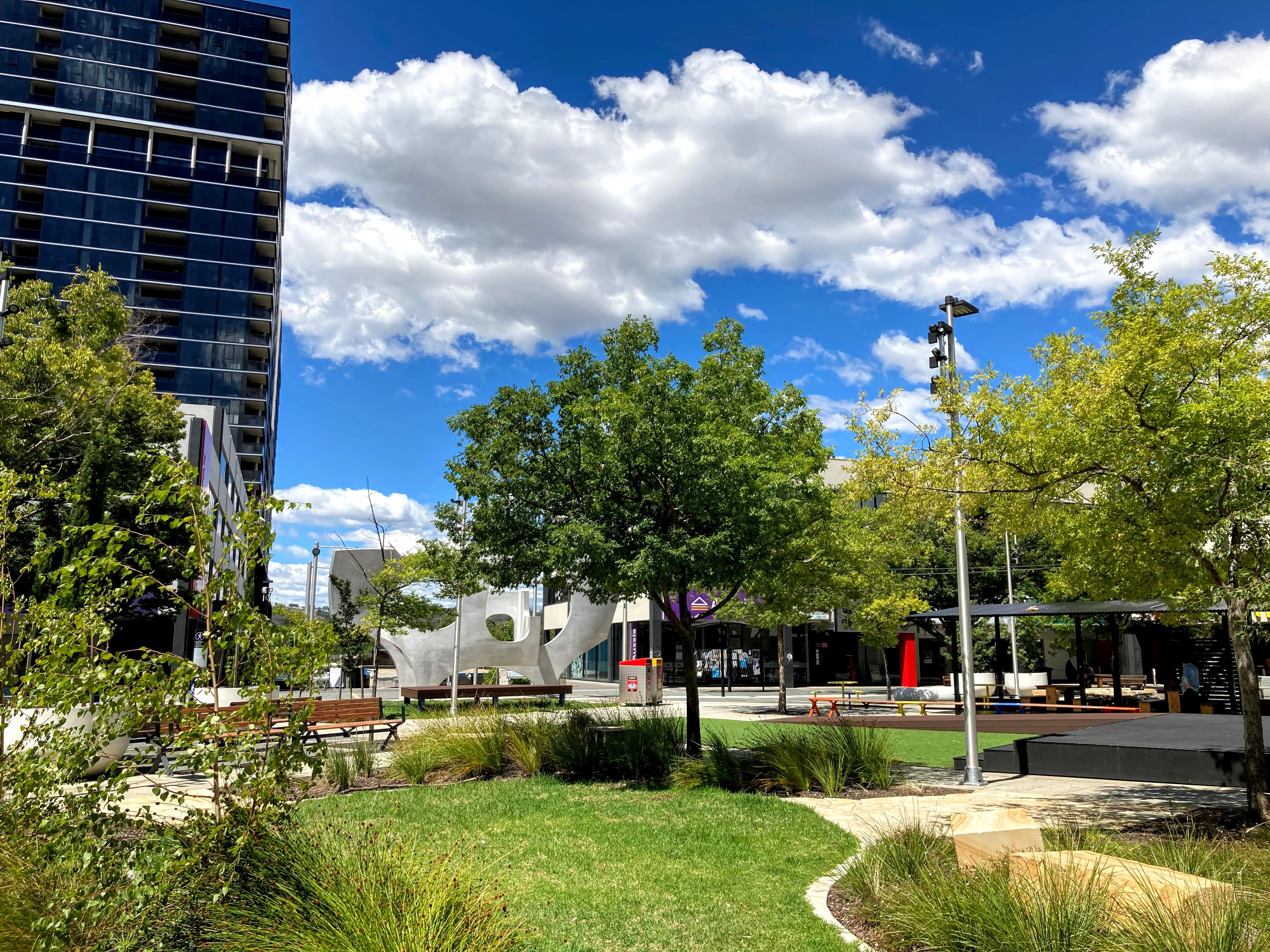
Woden Town Square in February 2021

The main shopping centre of Woden Town Centre is Westfield Woden, formerly called 'Woden Plaza' and 'Woden Shopping Square'. Westfield Woden includes major supermarkets (Woolworths and Coles), department stores such as David Jones and Big W, Hoyts cinemas and many other stores on several levels. Separate buildings house multi-storey car parks. Westfield Woden is intended to increase in size due to a redevelopment plan to improve the town centre.

The Woden Town Centre is home to Headquarters for the Department of Veterans' Affairs, the Clean Energy Regulator and IP Australia, located at the Discovery House, and the Department of Health, Disability and Ageing is located in the Sirius Building and Scarborough House building (of 14 stories), both are located on Furzer and Atlantic Street. A police station is located in the town centre, but moved from an older station next to the bus interchange, which was demolished in 2014.

The tallest commercial building in ACT, the 26 story 93 metre (305 ft) high Lovett Tower is located on Keltie Street. The tower was formerly known as the MLC Tower, but it was renamed in 2000 to honour the Lovett family. It was the tallest building in Canberra from its completion in 1973 until 2020. The tower is currently occupied by the Department of Veterans' Affairs, the Department of Climate Change, Energy, the Environment and Water and the Department of the Prime Minister and Cabinet. The Alexander and Albemarle Buildings once housed the Department of Health & Aged Care as its central office until its closure in 2010, where they were scheduled for demolition, but were instead redeveloped and reopened in 2020 as a mixed-use precinct.

The Woden Town Park is located across Callam street, although is infrequently used because of its location away from the major shopping areas. The Callam Offices formerly housed the Woden TAFE, and are suspended over the Yarralumla Creek, near the Woden Town Park. The Civil Aviation Safety Authority has its headquarters at the Aviation House, which is adjacent to the Sirius Building. The Juliana House now serves as an apartment of hotel, after four years of being vacant. As of 2014 the Bonner House in Neptune street headquarters the Indigenous Business Australia. The town centre has a postal office and a health centre. A Medibank branch is located in Woden. SkyPlaza is located in Woden, and is one of the tallest residential buildings in ACT, where it is 60 m (197 ft) in height, 20 floors, and was completed in 2005. The Woden Interchange provides transport for the area. The Phillip Ice Skating Centre was the home arena for the Canberra Knights, until 2014.

=== Education ===
Just outside the Woden Town Centre is the Phillip campus of the Canberra College, a secondary school catering to years 11 and 12 (16 – 18 years old). The town centre also has a local library which is located on Corinna Street.

== Gallery ==
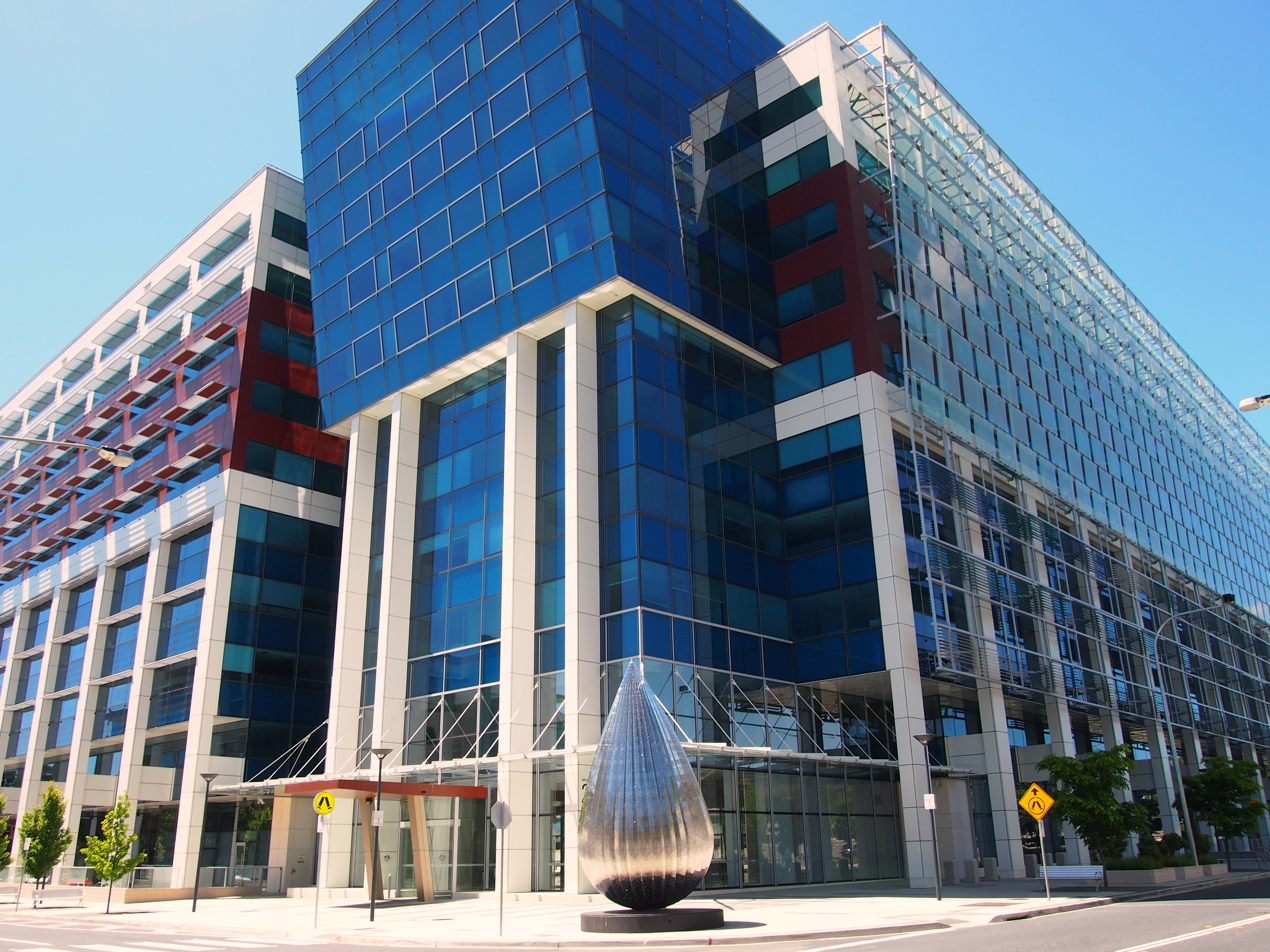
The Sirius Building, which houses part of the Department of Health

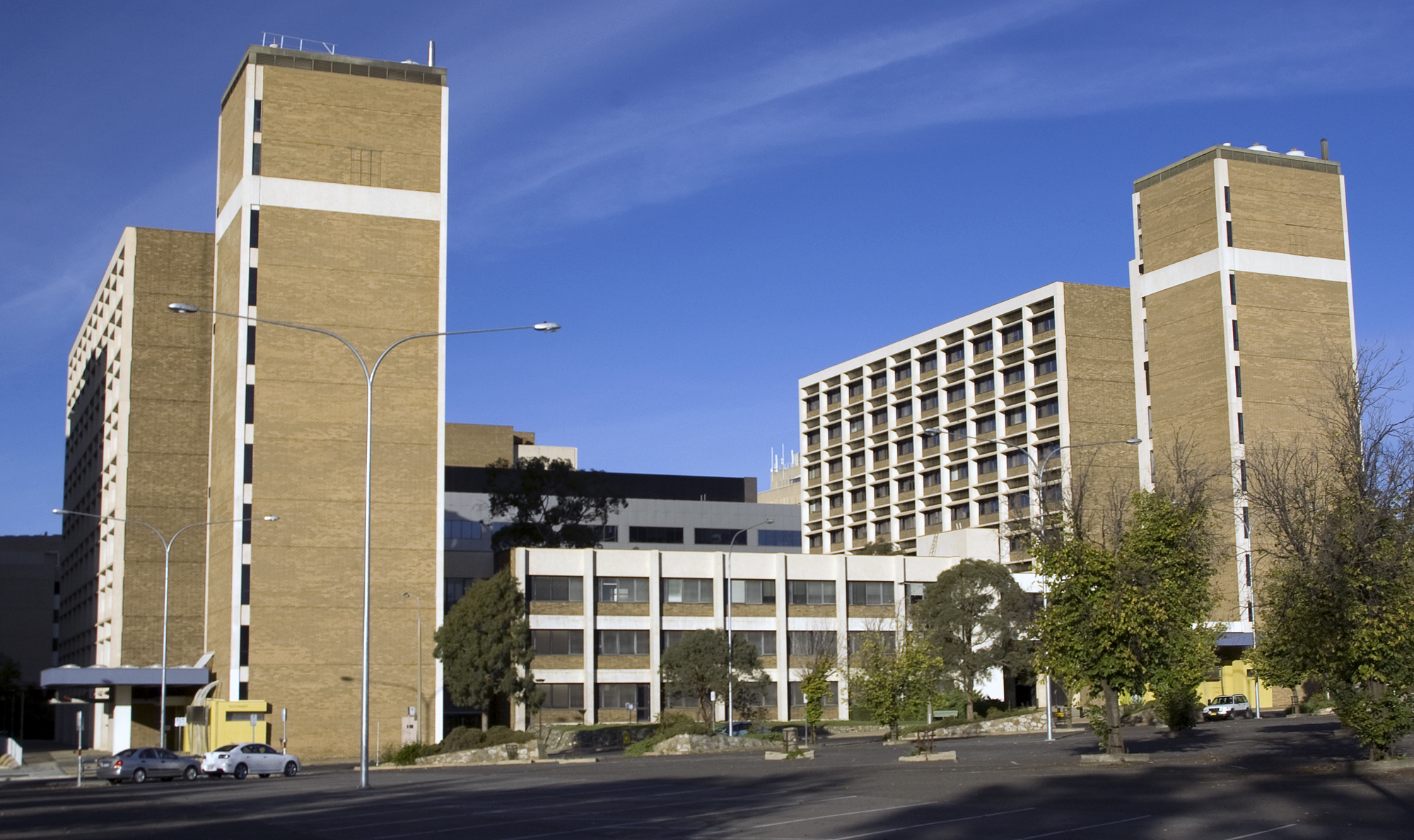
Alexander and Albemarle Buildings in 2010

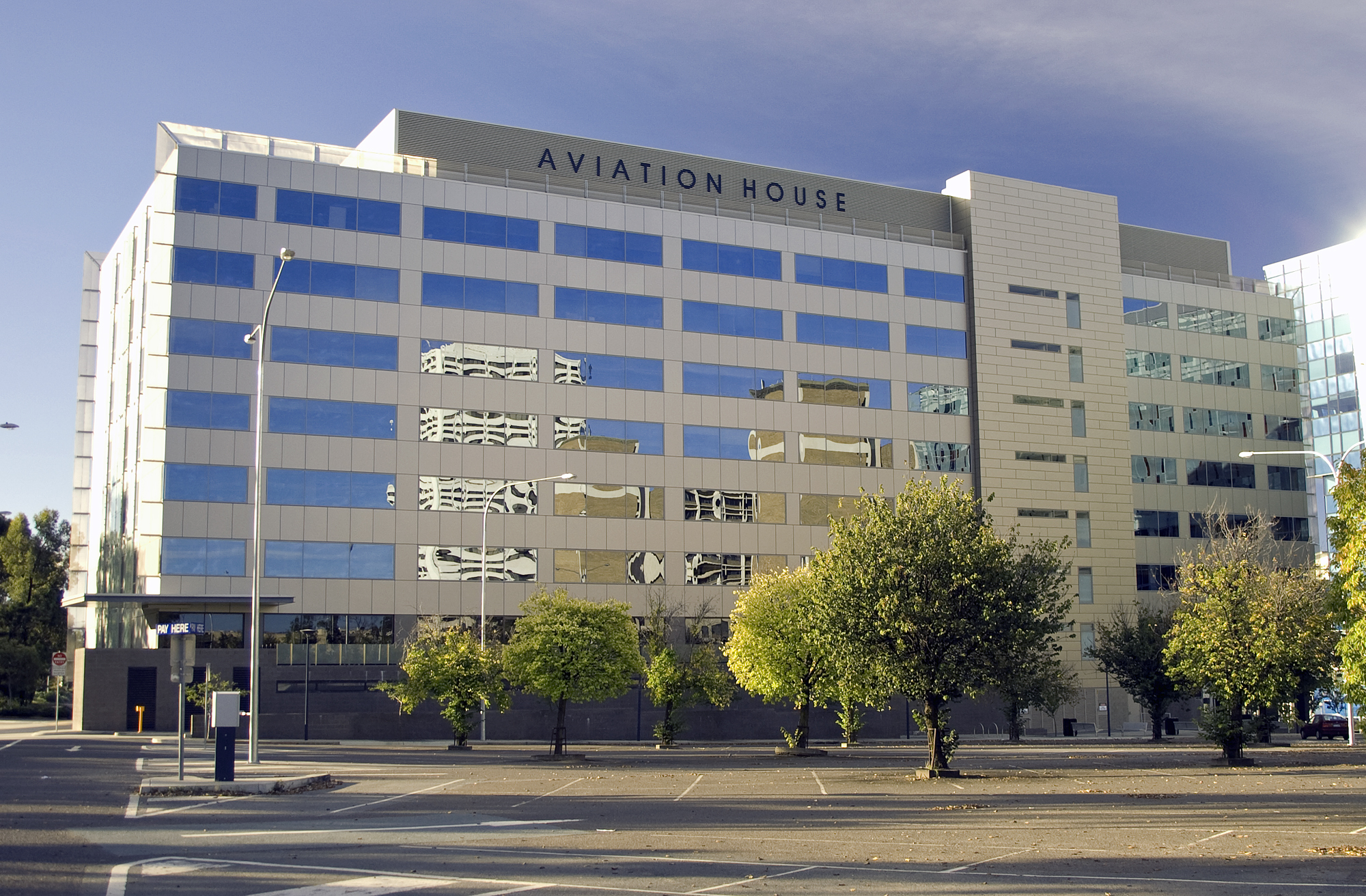
Aviation House in Woden

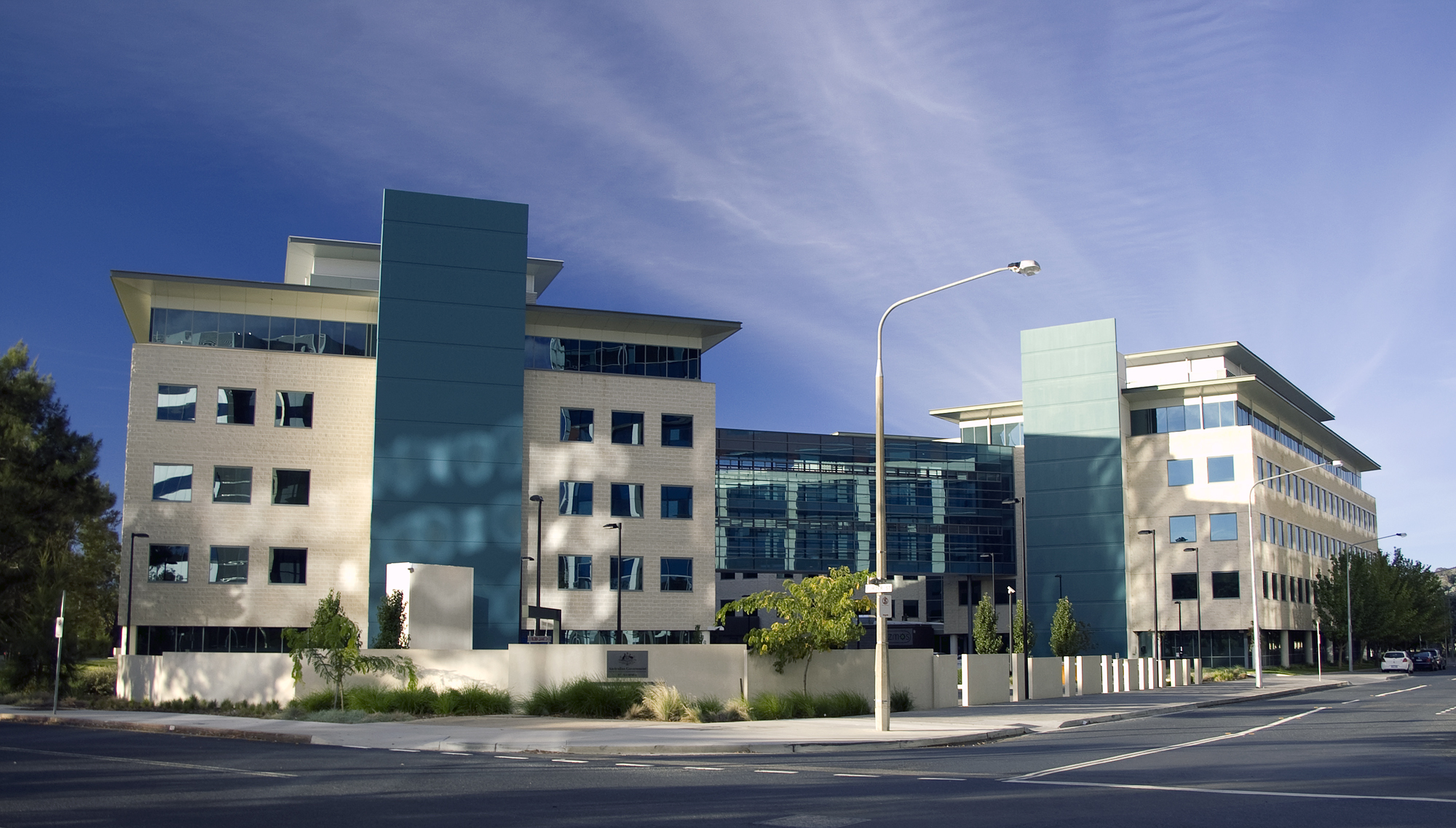
Discovery House in Woden

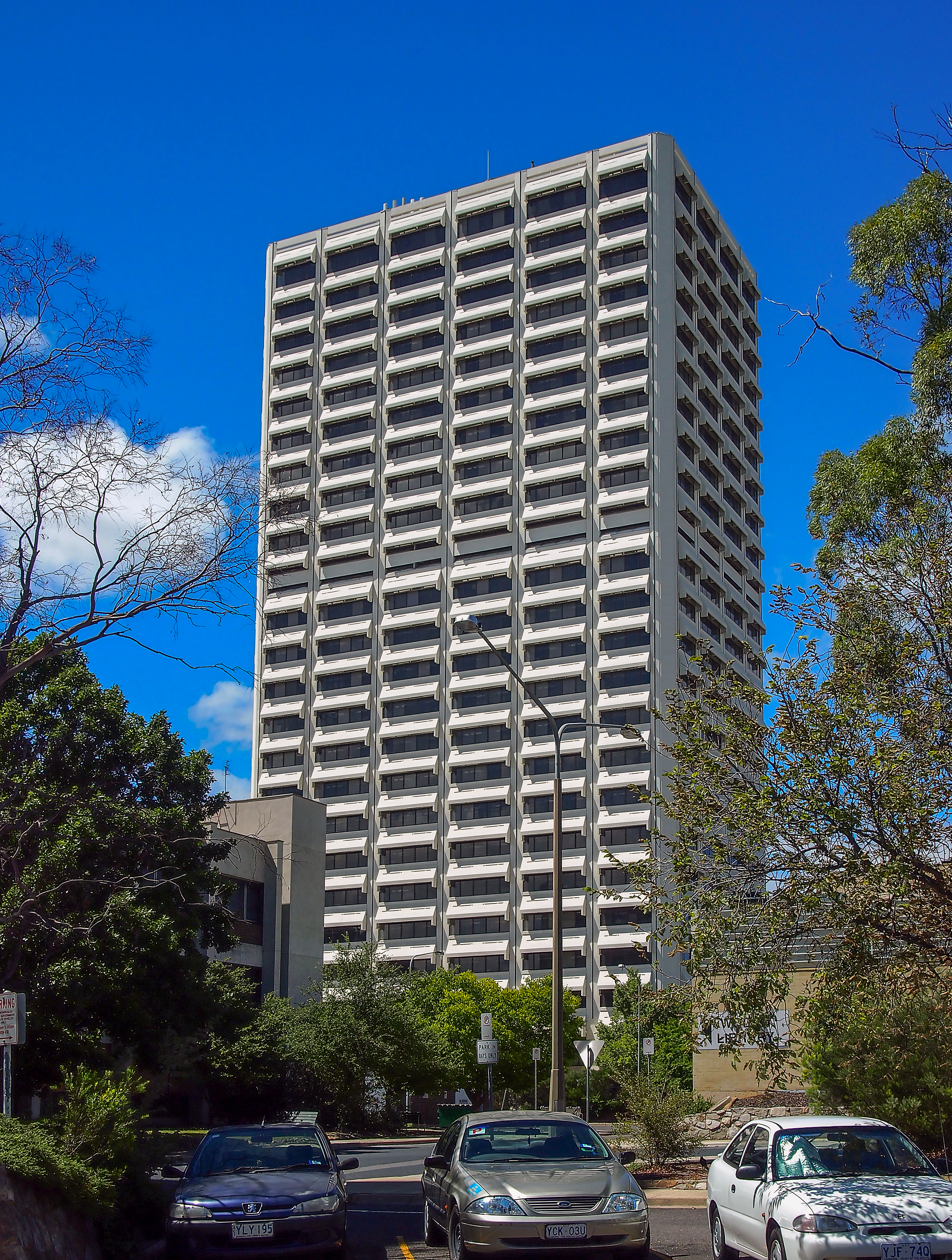
Lovett Tower, the third tallest building in ACT

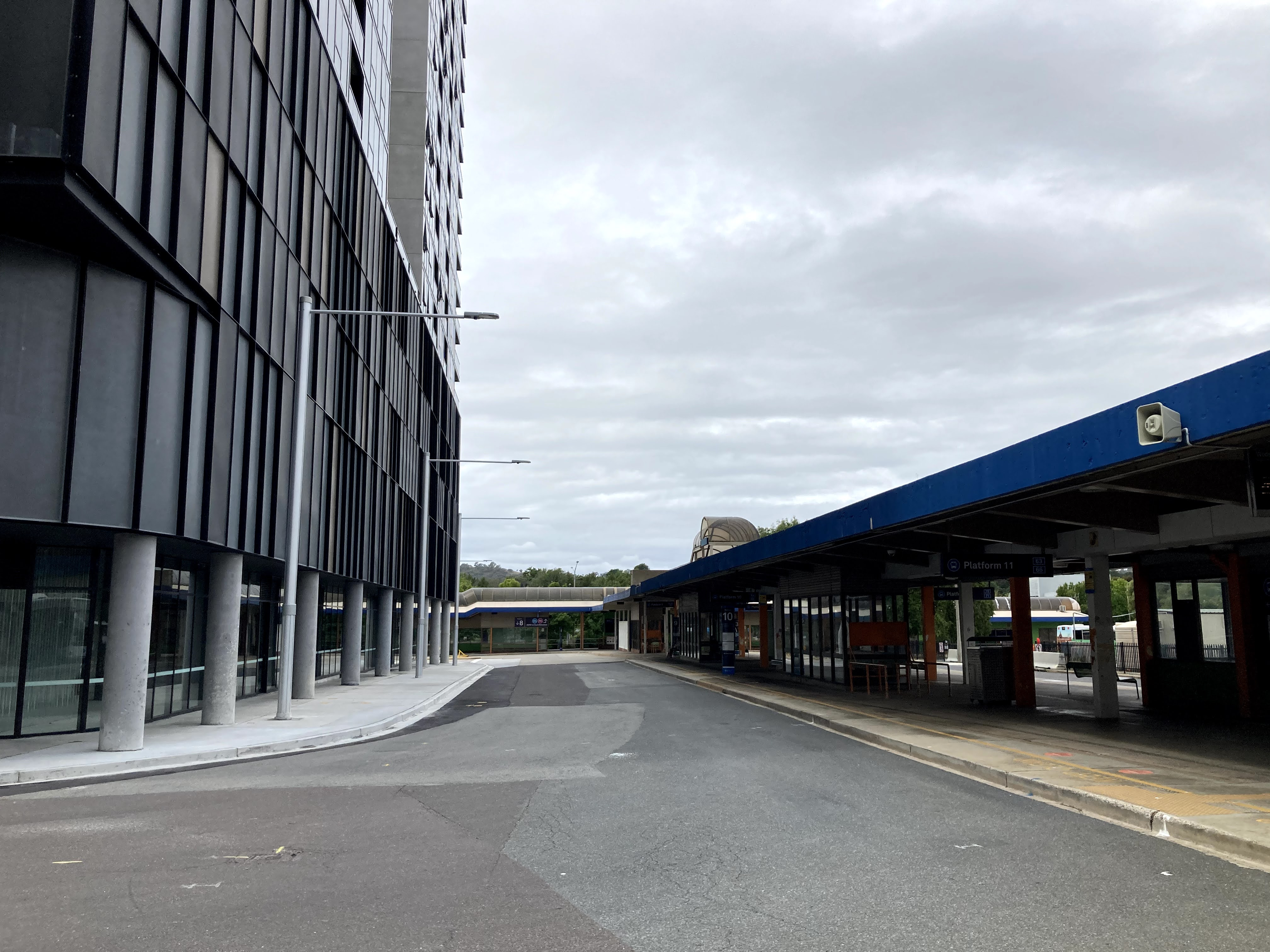
Woden Interchange in March 2021

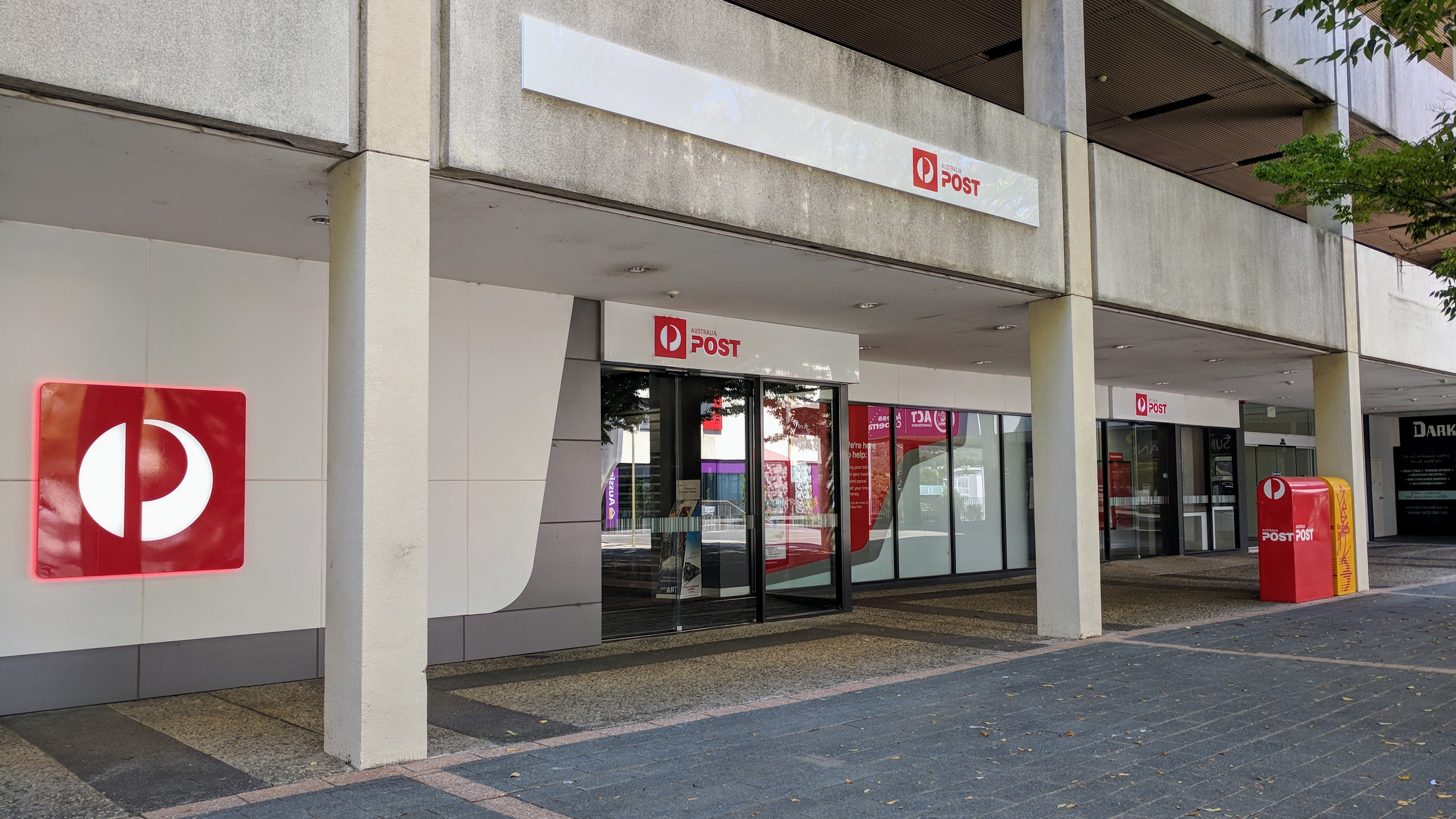
Post office

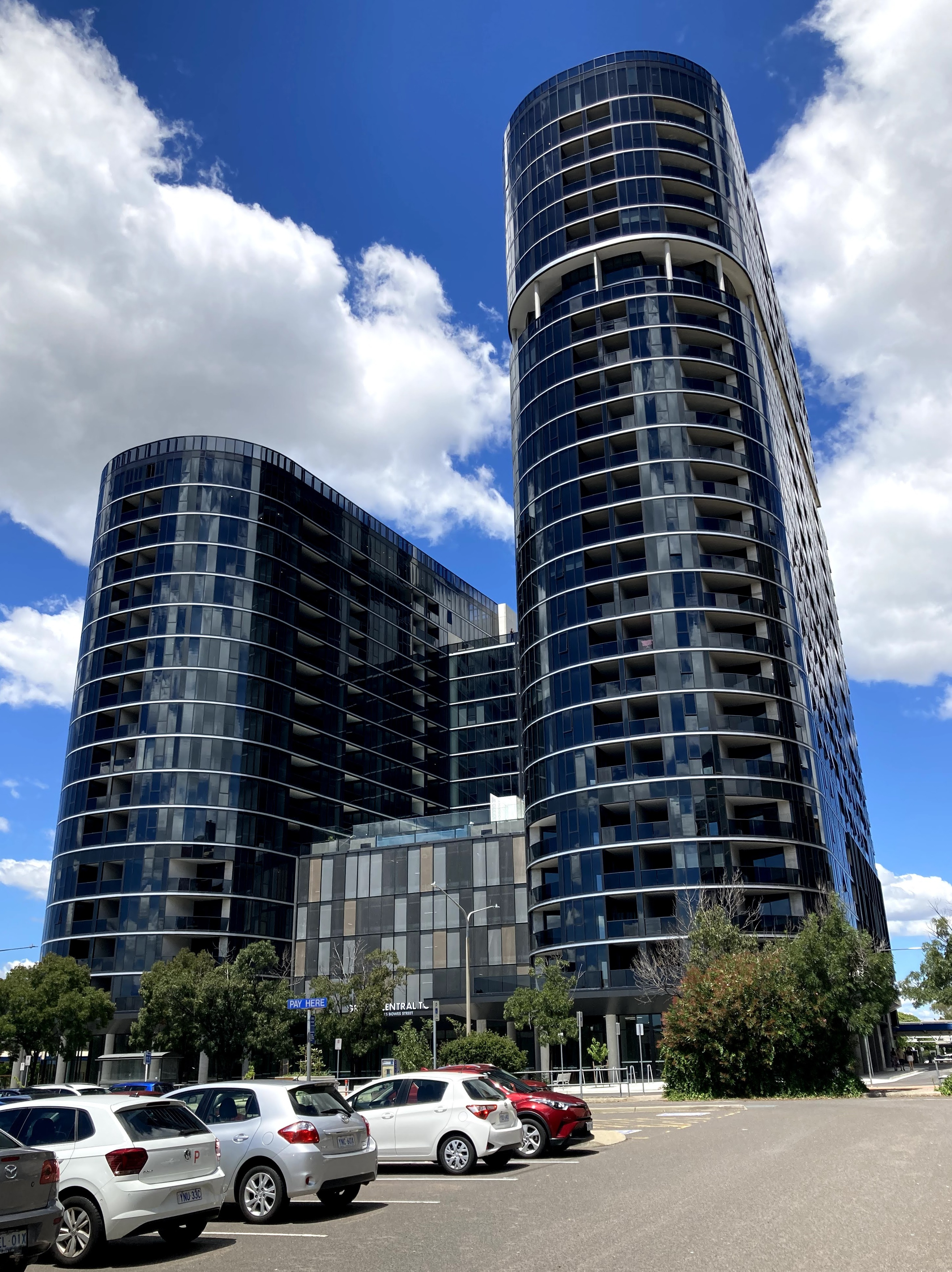
Grand Central Towers in February 2021

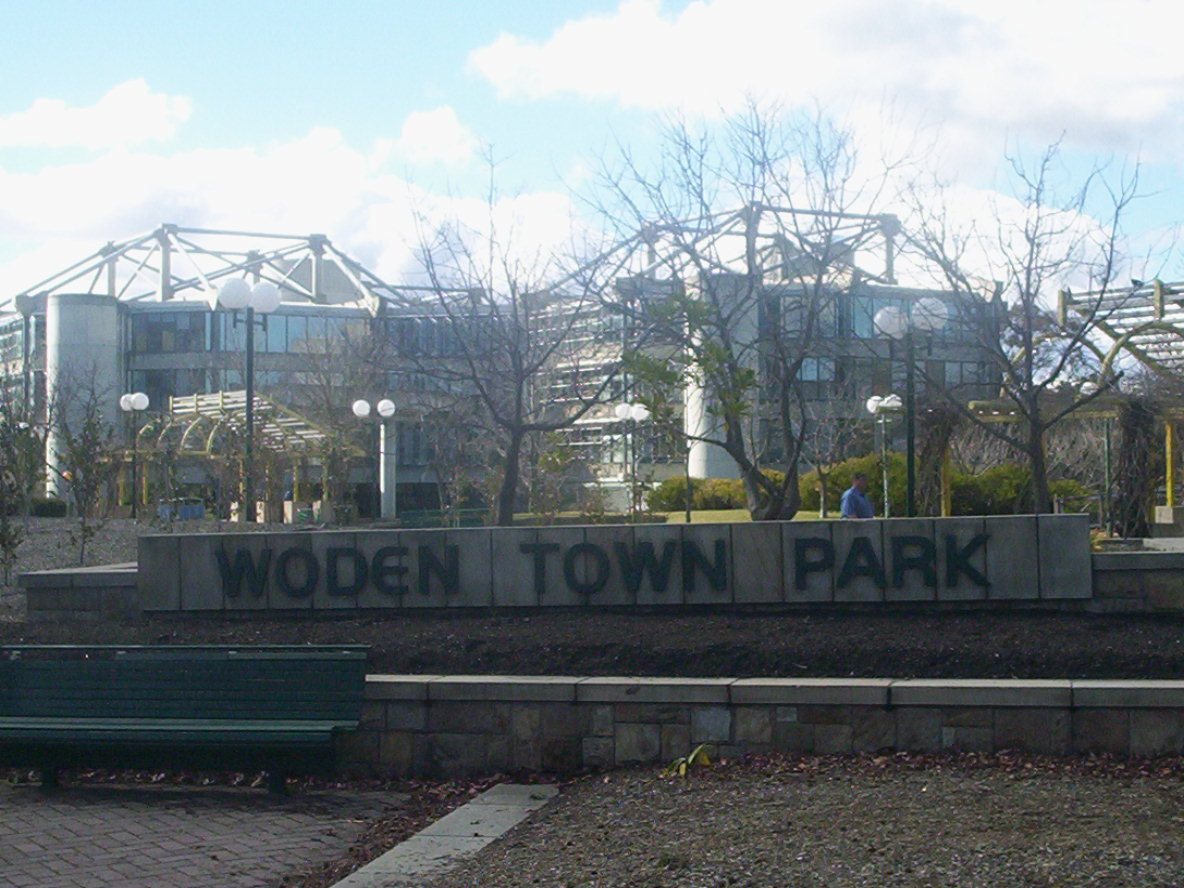
Woden Town Park in 2005, Callam Offices visible

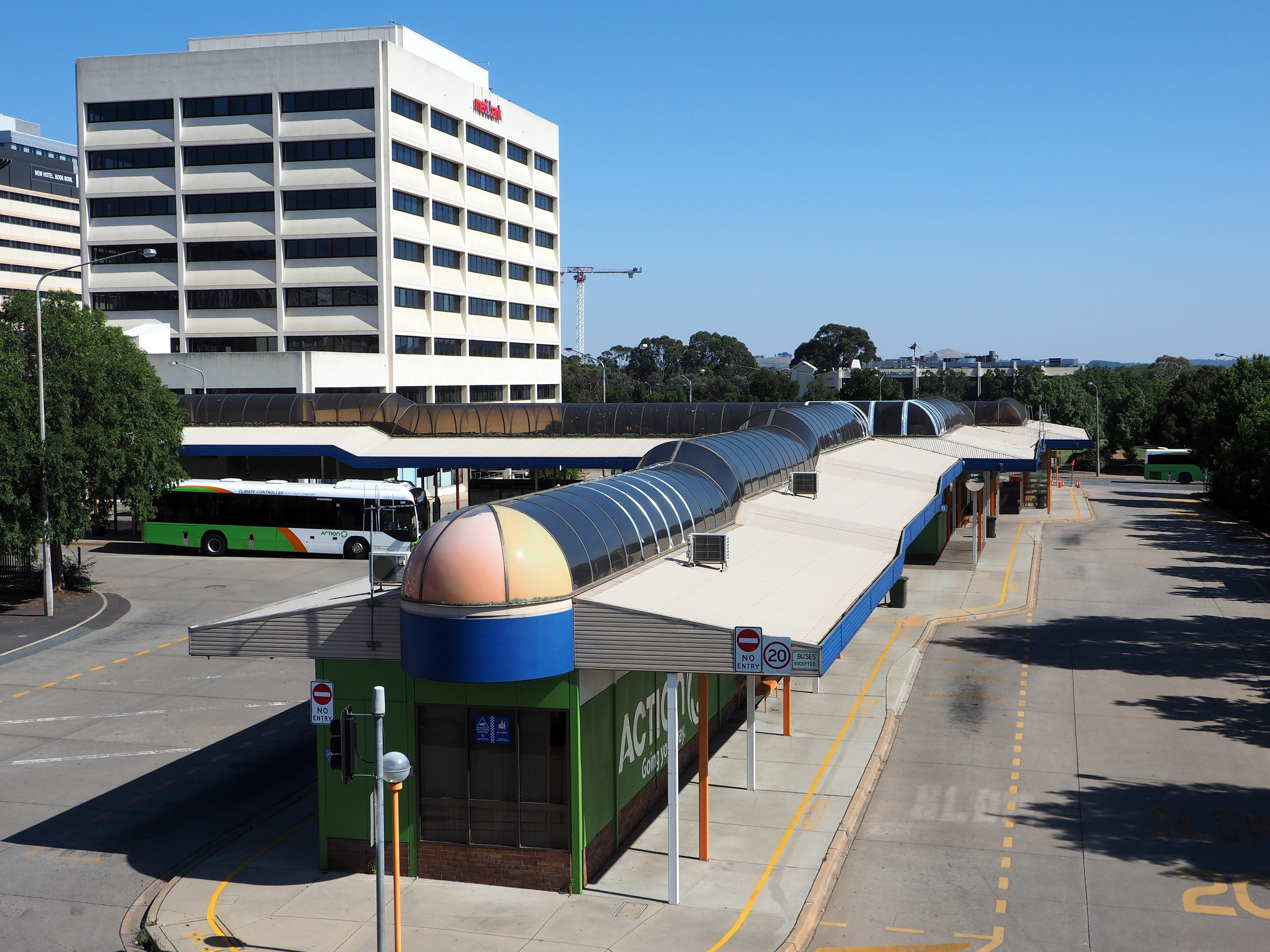
Part of Woden Interchange

== Related links ==
- Tom McKenna (town planner), involved in the National Capital Development Commission's planning of the town centre.
