= Thomas McKenna =

Thomas McKenna may refer to:

- T. P. McKenna (1929–2011), Irish actor
- Thomas McKenna (trade unionist) (1876–1939), British trade union leader
- Thomas McKenna, (born 1998 or 99), British singer-songwriter, by stage name Moss Kena
- Thomas P. McKenna (1930–2021), American Army officer and author

== See also ==
- Tom McKenna (disambiguation)
