= Canberra Institute of Technology =

Australian vocational education provider

Coordinates: 35.286°S 149.137°E

- Type: Public
- Established: 2 May 1928
- Students: 26,941 (2009)
- Location: Canberra, Australian Capital Territory
- Campus: Reid, Bruce, Phillip, Fyshwick, Tuggeranong, Gungahlin, Woden
- Website: cit.edu.au

The Canberra Institute of Technology (CIT) is a vocational education provider with five campuses located in Canberra, Australian Capital Territory. CIT is the largest Technical and Further Education provider in the Australian Capital Territory. Qualifications offered by CIT range from certificate to degree level. CIT has campuses across Canberra, located in Bruce, Reid, and Fyshwick. CIT also has two learning centres in Tuggeranong Town Centre and Gungahlin, which are primarily for students studying via flexible or distance learning. A Woden campus is currently under construction, due to be completed in 2025.

== History ==
Originally named the Telopea Park Technical Trades School, the first ‘CIT’ was officially opened by Prime Minister Stanley Bruce on 6 June 1928. This was changed in 1975 to the Canberra College of Technical and Further Education. It later merged with Bruce and Woden TAFEs. It has been a Territory Authority since 4 January 1988.

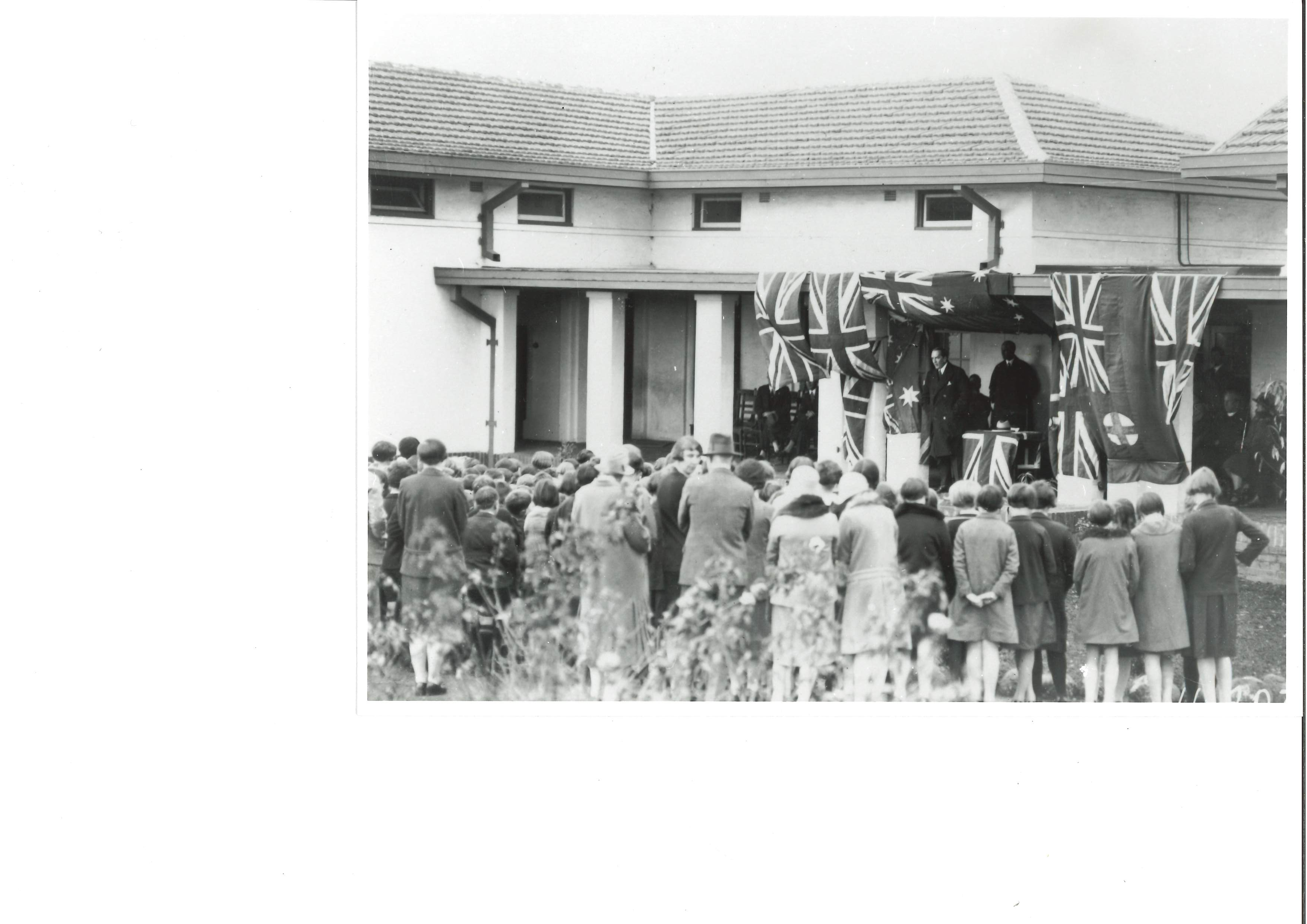
Opening of Telopea Park Trade School

Some courses at CIT can be undertaken via Flexible Learning where students do not have to study according to a semester-based timetable.

== Student numbers ==
In 2009, CIT had 26,941 student enrolments.

== Campuses ==
CIT Bruce. The suburb of Bruce is in northwest Canberra. This campus is approximately 4 km from the nearest town centre (Belconnen) which includes a Westfield shopping centre, Uni-gardens CIT student accommodation.

CIT Woden (currently under construction) A new flagship campus is currently under construction in Woden Town Centre on the site of the former Woden Interchange. Construction started in 2023 and is due to be completed by 2025, with classes commencing in Semester 2 of that year. The new campus will be a contemporary, smart campus and will include; IT and cyber training spaces, activated common areas and practical green spaces, dedicated 24-hour study space with access to computers, dedicated library services on the ground floor, a training restaurant and commercial kitchens, and a multi-purpose hall available for performances, training, and events. The range of courses currently being delivered at CIT Reid will transition across to CIT Woden.

== CIT and universities ==
CIT and the University of Canberra (UC): CIT and UC collaborate on a number of initiatives, most prominently pathways and transfers between the two institutions. CIT students who complete a diploma or advanced diploma are guaranteed an offer of a place in an undergraduate degree at the University of Canberra. In addition, over 150 formal credit transfer arrangements exist between the institutions.

CIT and the University of Canberra also form two-thirds of the collaborative organization, the National Centre for Forensic Studies.

CIT and the Australian National University (ANU): collaborate on the delivery of two associate degree programs – the Bachelor of Science and the Bachelor of Engineering, whereby students complete the first year of the degree at CIT and the second at ANU. Further, graduates automatically gain entry into a 'linked' ANU Bachelor's degree with 18 months credit.

CIT and Charles Sturt University (CSU) also have a number of formalized credit transfer agreements whereby graduates of CIT's Diploma / Advanced Diploma programs receive credit when they commence a linked CSU degree.

CIT and the Academy of Interactive Entertainment (AIE): CIT and AIE jointly deliver a number of programs including the Bachelor of Games and Virtual Worlds (Programming).

== 2025 ICT outage ==
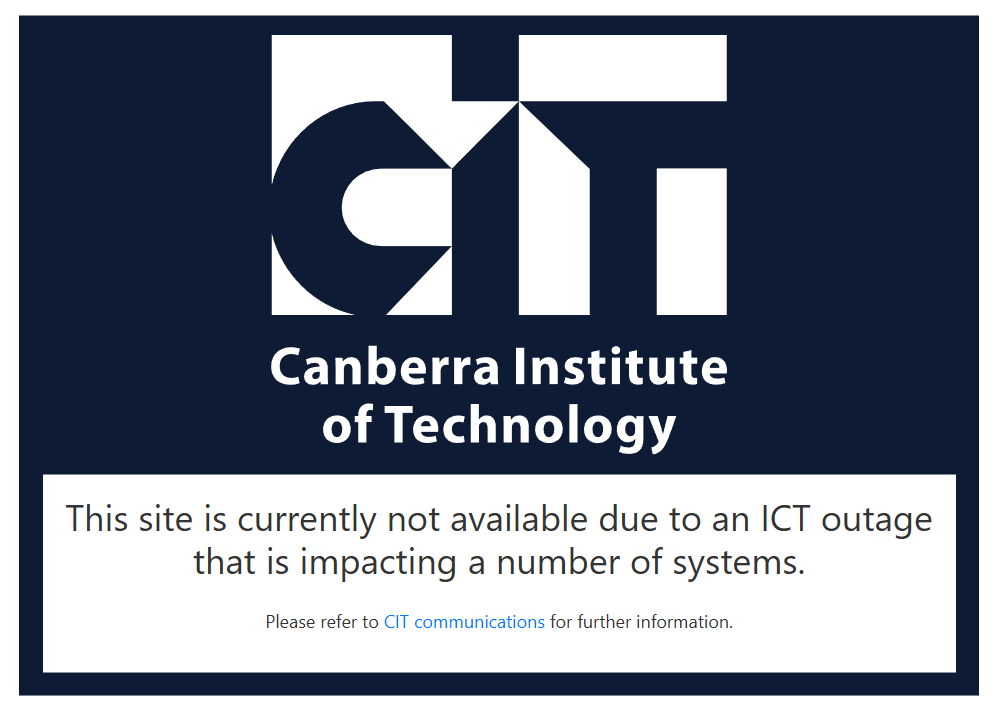
eLearn maintenance page of Moodle open source server

On 20 February 2025, a whole-of-government ICT outage affected several key systems, including communication channels and CIT's online learning platform eLearn, which lost data submissions between 6 January 2025 and 19 February 2025. On 5 March, access to all systems was restored; however, some course content and student submission data could not be recovered.
