= Tom McKenna (footballer, born 1919) =

Scottish footballer (1919–2008)

Personal information
- Full name: Thomas McKenna
- Date of birth: 11 November 1919
- Place of birth: Paisley, Scotland
- Date of death: December 2008 (aged 89)
- Place of death: Chelmsford, England
- Position: Wing half

Senior career*
Years	Team	Apps	(Gls)
1945–1946	St Mirren		
1946–1948	Reading	28	(1)
1948–1950	Grimsby Town	50	(2)
1950–1954	Chelmsford City		
- * Club domestic league appearances and goals

Thomas McKenna (11 November 1919 – December 2008) was a Scottish professional footballer who played as a wing half.
