= Tom McKenna (town planner) =

Scottish-Australian town planner

- Occupation: Urban planner

Thomas Benedict McKenna (1925–1977) was a Scottish-Australian town planner, instrumental in the development of modern planning in Australia.

McKenna graduated from Durham University with a degree in town planning in 1952. After spending five years working as a planner in Glasgow, he emigrated to Australia in 1961, joining the National Capital Development Commission, the body tasked with the establishment of Canberra as Australia's capital. He contributed to the planning of Woden Town Centre and the 1967 "Y Plan".

From 1967 he worked on urban renewal projects in Singapore, returning to Australia in 1971 to head the planning school of the South Australian Institute of Technology (Now UniSA), which he led until 1977. He is now honoured by the Annual Tom McKenna public lecture held by the Planning Institute of Australia.
