= Woden Interchange =

Bus interchange in Canberra, Australia

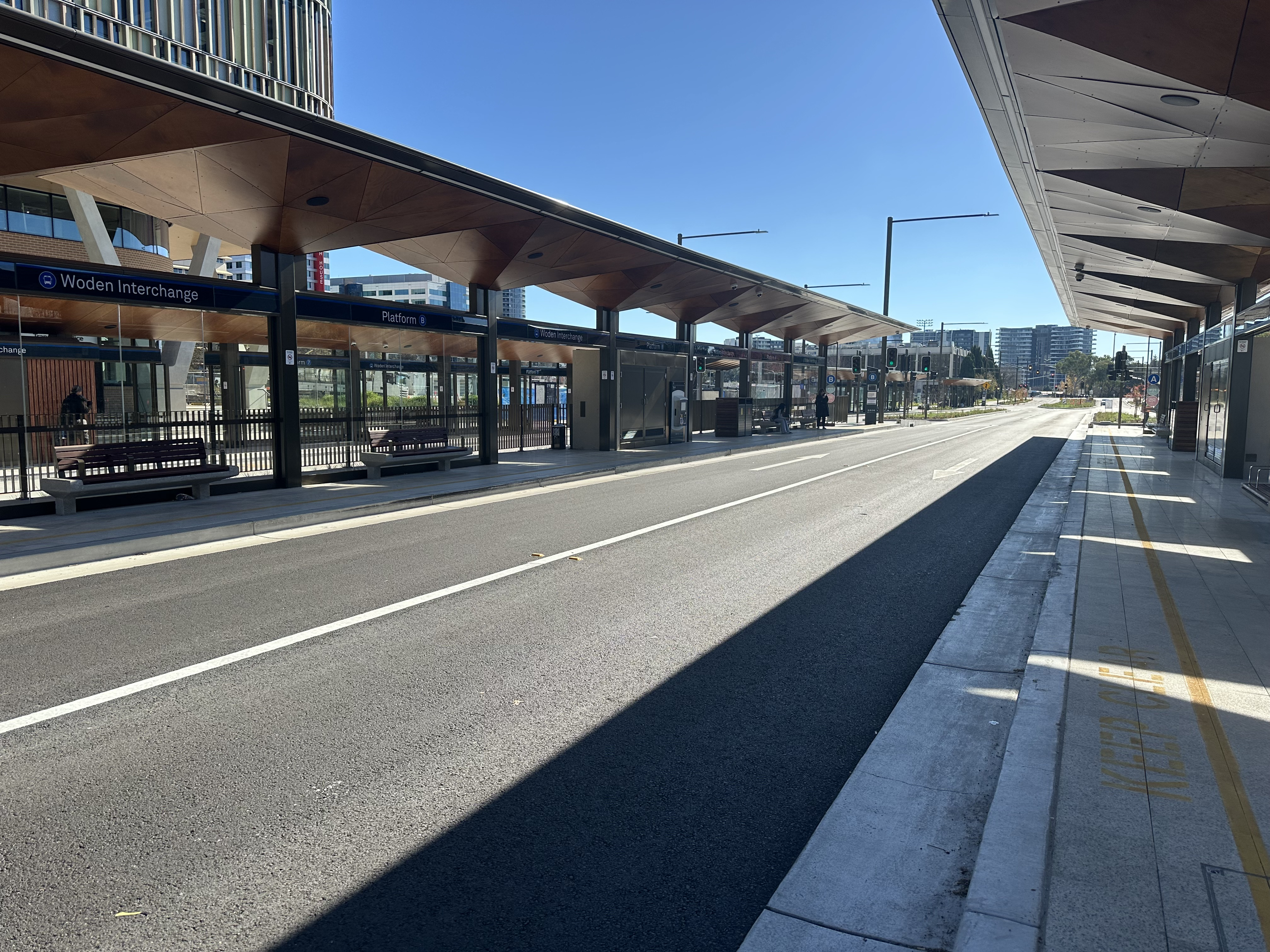
- View from Platform A in May 2026

General information
- Other names: Woden bus station (1927–2019)
- Location: Callam Street, Woden Town Centre, Canberra, Australia
- Coordinates: 35.3432°S 149.0872°E
- Owner: Transport Canberra
- Bus routes: 22
- Bus stands: 10
- Bus operators: ACTION; CDC Canberra

Other information
- Website: Transport Canberra

History
- Opened: 4 December 1972 (original); 20 April 2026 (redeveloped)
- Closed: 29 January 2023 (original)
Location

Woden Interchange is a bus station located in the Woden Town Centre in the Canberra suburb of Phillip. It was opened in 1972 and is served by ACTION and CDC Canberra services.

The original interchange closed in 2023 and was replaced by a temporary facility until a redeveloped interchange opened three years later.

== History ==
=== Original Interchange (1972-2023) ===
In March 1972, the National Capital Development Commission awarded Leighton Contractors a contract to build Woden bus station. It opened on 4 December 1972. On 6 December 1982, an upgrade was completed that doubled its size and included heated waiting rooms. This increased the number of bus platforms from 15 single-bus bays to 17 mostly double-bus bays.

Canberra was a pioneer of the timed-transfer bus system, and was cited as a model in a 1981 study for the US Department of Transportation. A map of a theoretical bus station was presented based on Woden Interchange.

In 1994, a further upgrade was completed.

Having been named Woden bus station since it opened, in April 2019 it was renamed Woden Interchange. It was to be replaced by a new interchange with a Canberra Institute of Technology campus to open on the old site in 2025. It closed on 29 January 2023 with a temporary facility opened to the north pending completion of a permanent replacement as part of the Woden light rail station.

=== New Interchange (2026-Present) ===
The new bus interchange opened on 20 April 2026, with the closure of the temporary interchange.

== Services ==
Woden Interchange was served by ACTION and CDC Canberra services.
