= Welcome Mart =

Former Australian supermarket chain

- Formerly: Foodmaster (1983-1992)
- Company type: Subsidiary
- Industry: Retail
- Founded: 1992; 34 years ago
- Defunct: 2014; 12 years ago
- Number of locations: 13 stores (1994)
- Parent: Metcash

Welcome Mart was an Australian supermarket banner that existed from 1992 to 2014.

== History ==
Welcome Mart was founded by Davids Holdings in Canberra and New South Wales in 1992, the same time they rebranded some of Canberra's supermarkets as Festival. They rebranded all the Foodmaster Supermarkets.

== Operations ==
In 1989, the Foodmaster supermarkets were located in Downer, Fisher, Fraser, Holder, Isaacs, Kambah, Kingston, Latham, McKellar, Melba, Monash, O'Connor, Red Hill, and Wanniassa.

In 1992, all Foodmaster supermarkets were rebranded as Welcome Mart or Foodtown. The first stores of Welcome Mart opened in Dickson, Downer, Fraser, Holder, Isaacs, Kambah, Kingston, Latham, Macquarie, McKellar, Melba, and Queanbeyan. In 1994, one supermarket opened in Theodore. In a 1999 study, the Parliament of the Commonwealth of Australia counted three Welcome Marts in Australia, but Welcome Marts was part of the independent retailers that operated several banners.

The Isaacs Welcome Mart was rebranded as a general supermarket in 2000, and in 2014, it rebranded and now operates as Shoplands. Eventually, by 2014, almost all Welcome Mart Supermarkets were bought out.

== Slogan ==
"The Friendliest Supermarket in Town" was their slogan.
