= Foodmaster Supermarkets =

Former Australian supermarket chain

- Company type: Private
- Industry: Retail
- Founded: 1983; 42 years ago
- Defunct: 1992; 33 years ago
- Fate: Rebranded to Welcome Mart or Foodtown
- Number of locations: 14 stores (1992)
- Area served: Australian Capital Territory
- Products: Supermarket

Foodmaster Supermarkets was an Australian supermarket chain that was founded in Canberra in 1983.

== History ==
The supermarkets were located in Downer, O'Connor, Melba, McKellar, Kingston, Red Hill, Wanniassa, Latham, Fraser, Holder, Kambah, Monash and Fisher.

In 1989, one Foodmaster opened in Isaacs.

In 1992, all Foodmaster supermarkets were rebranded as Welcome Mart or Foodtown.
