= Farrer, Australian Capital Territory =

Farrer
- Suburb
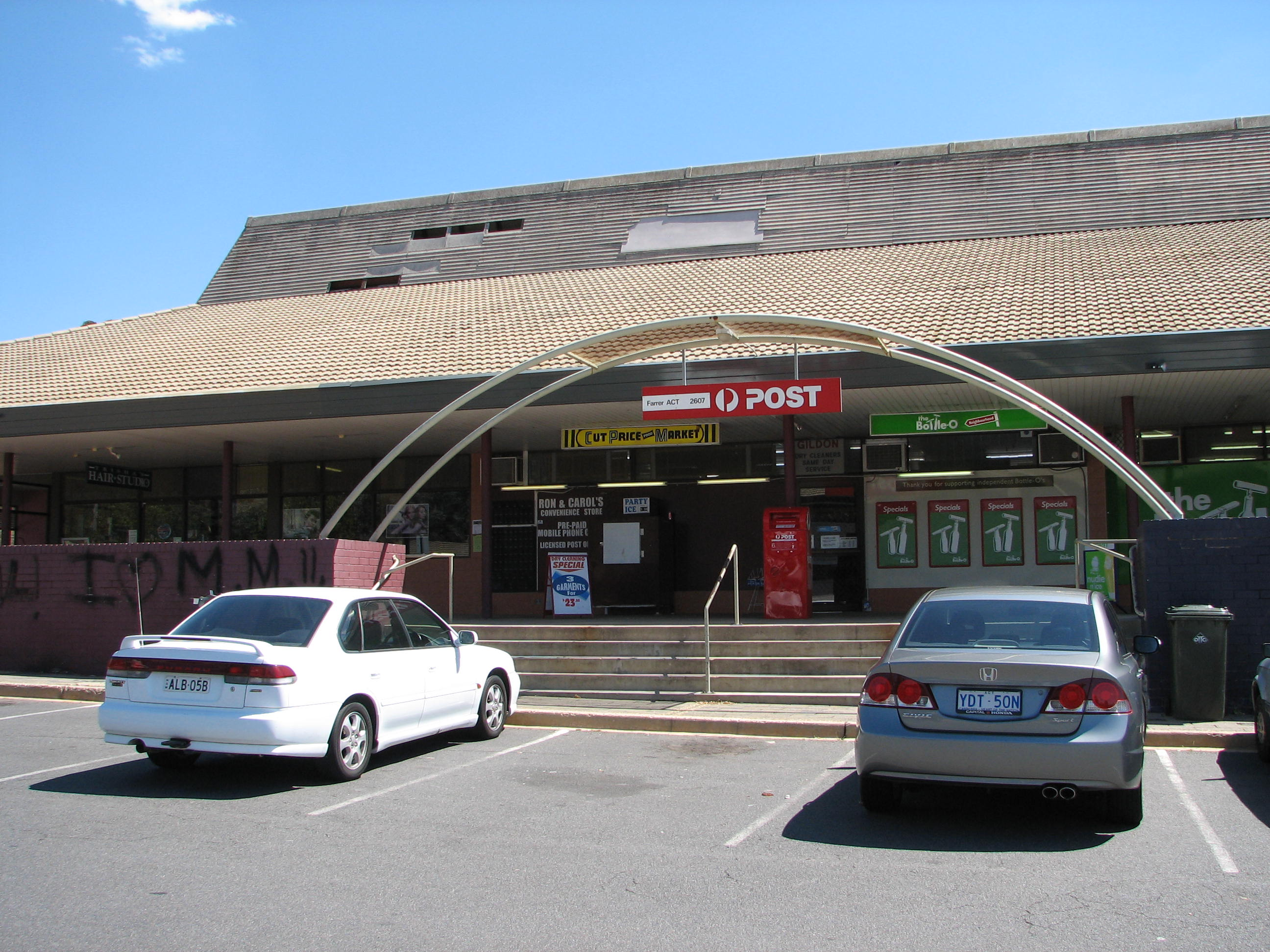
- Farrer shops c. 2007

- Coordinates: 35.377239472353324°S 149.1048505468236°E
- Country: Australia
- State: Australian Capital Territory
- City: Canberra
- District: Woden Valley
- Location: 15 km (9.3 mi) S of Canberra CBD; 16 km (9.9 mi) WSW of Queanbeyan; 102 km (63 mi) SW of Goulburn; 299 km (186 mi) SW of Sydney
- Established: 1967

Government
  - Territory electorate: Murrumbidgee
  - Federal division: Bean

Area
  - Total: 2.1 km^{2} (0.81 sq mi)
- Elevation: 643 m (2,110 ft)

Population
  - Total: 3,787 (SAL 2021)
- Postcode: 2607
Suburbs around Farrer
Torrens	Mawson	Isaacs
Torrens	Farrer

Farrer is a suburb in Canberra, Australia district of Woden.

== Name origin ==
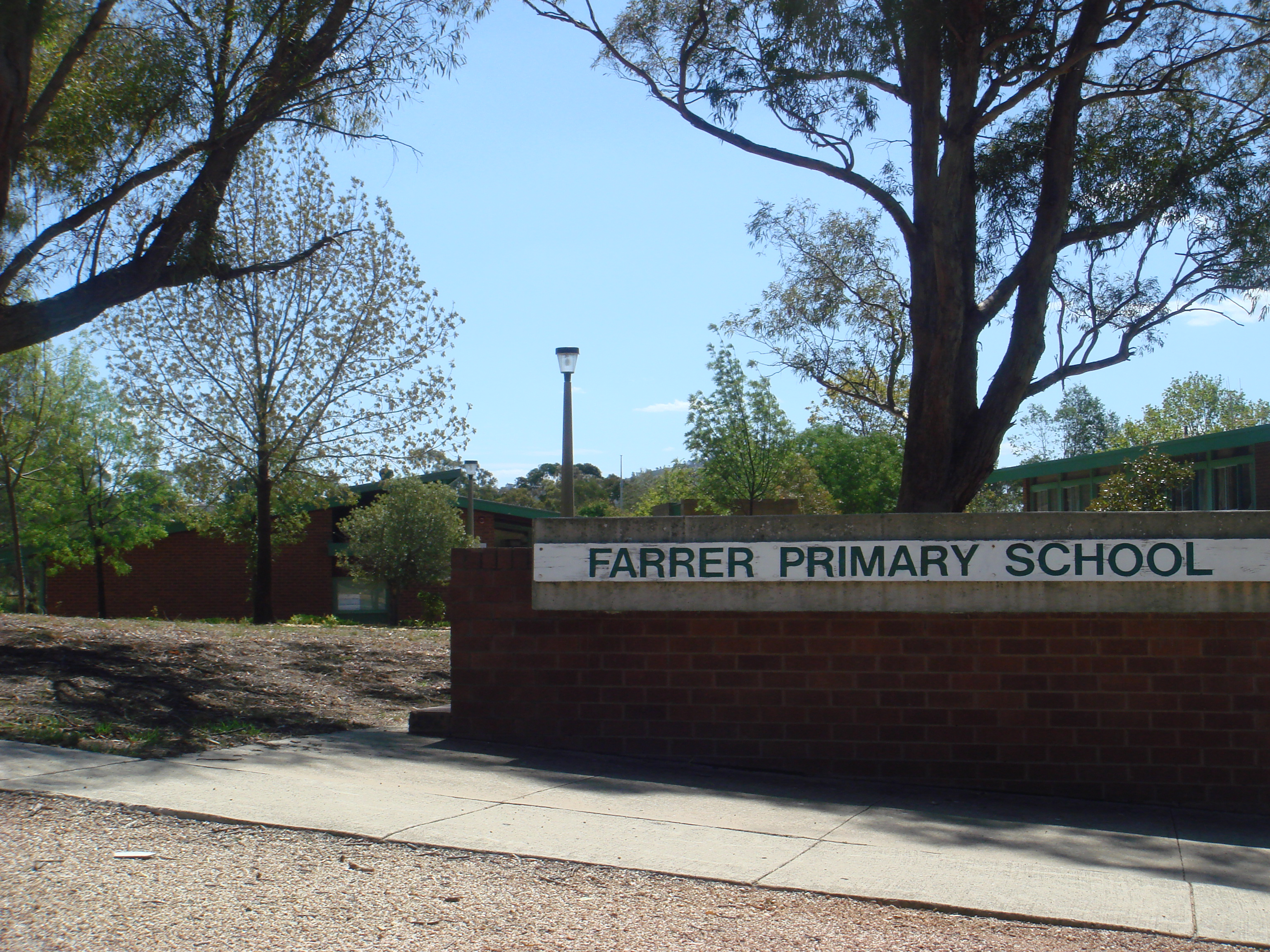
Farrer Primary School

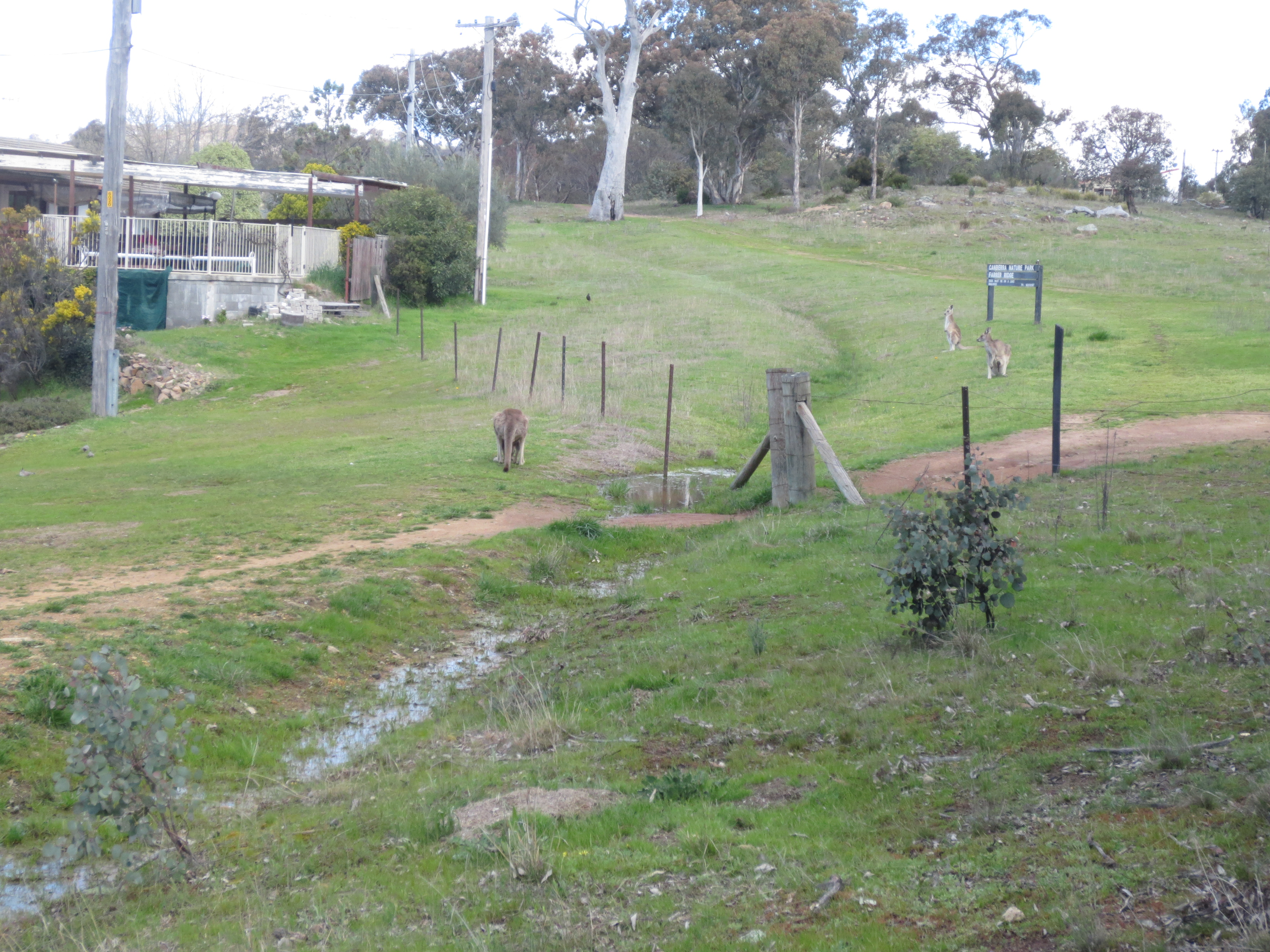
Kangaroos adjacent to suburban house in Farrer

Named for William James Farrer (1845–1906), who was a wheat-breeding pioneer, many of whose experiments were conducted at Lambrigg near Tharwa. The suburb's streets are named after agriculturalists, except for Lambrigg Street, which was the name of Farrer's property in Tharwa.

== Location ==
It is next to the suburbs of Torrens, Mawson, Isaacs and the Tuggeranong suburb of Wanniassa through Farrer Ridge. It is bordered by Beasley Street, Athllon Drive, and Yamba Drive. Located in this suburb is Farrer Primary School and neighbourhood oval, a Croatian Catholic parish centre, the Serbian Orthodox Church of St Sava, a small shopping centre, the former Long Gully scout hall ‒ now a nature playspace ‒ and the Goodwin Village, and The Pines for elderly citizens.

== General information ==
Farrer is a relatively large suburb for Canberra, with over 3,300 residents. It was named on 12 May 1966, after William James Farrer, who had lived in the area late in the 19th century, making a significant contribution to wheat-breeding in New South Wales by producing climate species, thus extending the wheat-belt and enabling the breeding of resistant wheat.

The suburb's size resulted in possession of its own oval, located next to the primary school, a scout hall for the local group named Long Gully. Four playgrounds are at various locations, with the main one 'Farrer Nature Play & Adventure Trail' adjacent to the Scout Hall. Pearce's Melrose High School and Wanniassa's Erindale College are only 2.4 kilometres (1.5 mi) and 2.7 kilometres (1.7 mi) away respectively. While the small convenience store is often frequented by locals, Farrer is in proximity to Southlands Shopping Centre at Mawson and Woden Plaza in Phillip, only 4.2 kilometres (2.6 mi) away. Canberra Hospital in Garran is nearer still, at 3.8 kilometres (2.4 mi).

The Farrer Ridge Nature Reserve, part of the Canberra Nature Park and half the suburb, provides for bushwalking and stunning vistas.

== Geology ==
Deakin Volcanics green-grey and purple rhyodacite underlies the whole suburb. Deakin Volcanics cream rhyolite occurs on the top of Farrer Ridge. Quaternary alluvium can be found in the valley bottom.

== Gallery ==
Fauna of Farrer
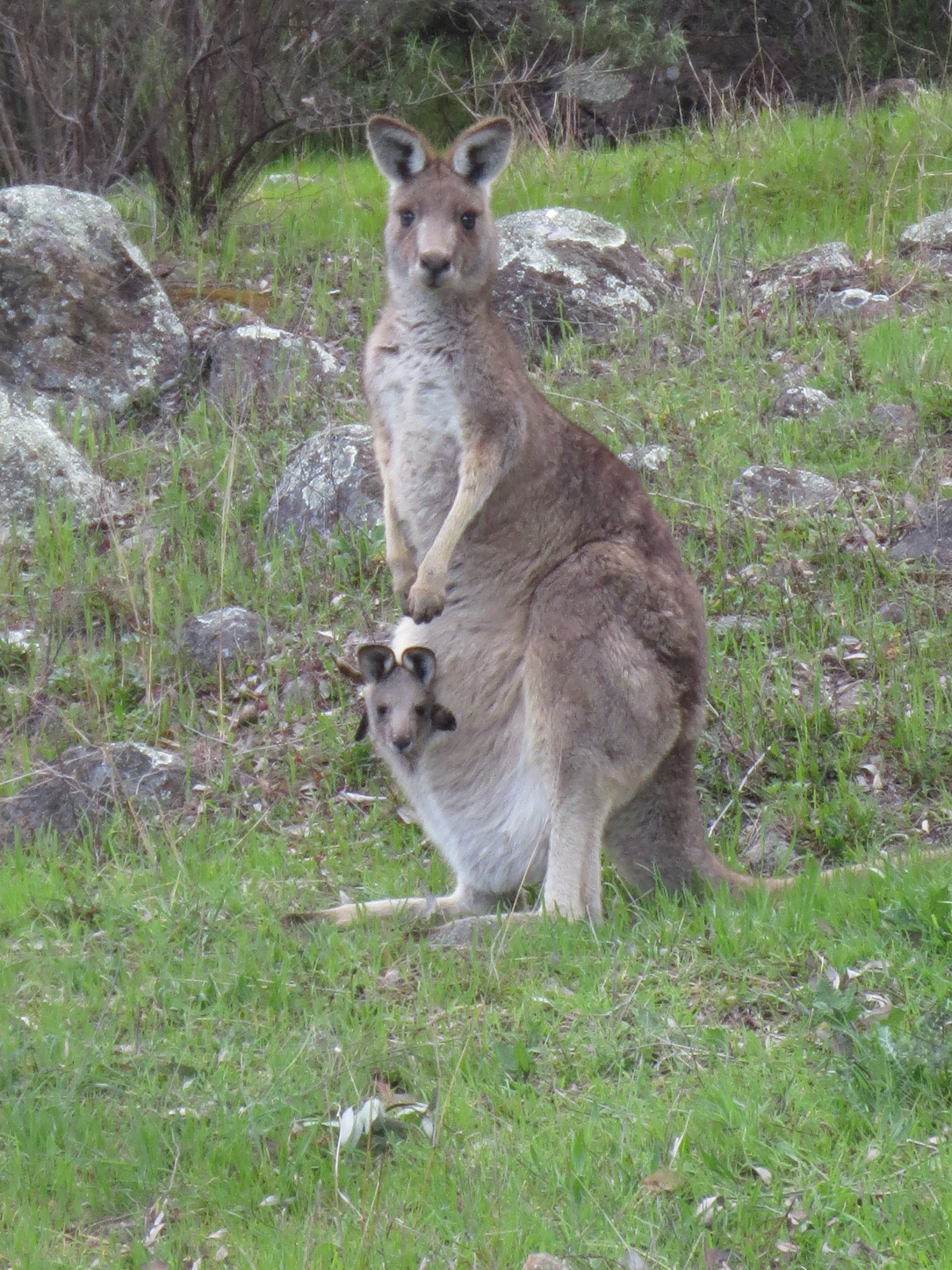
Kangaroo

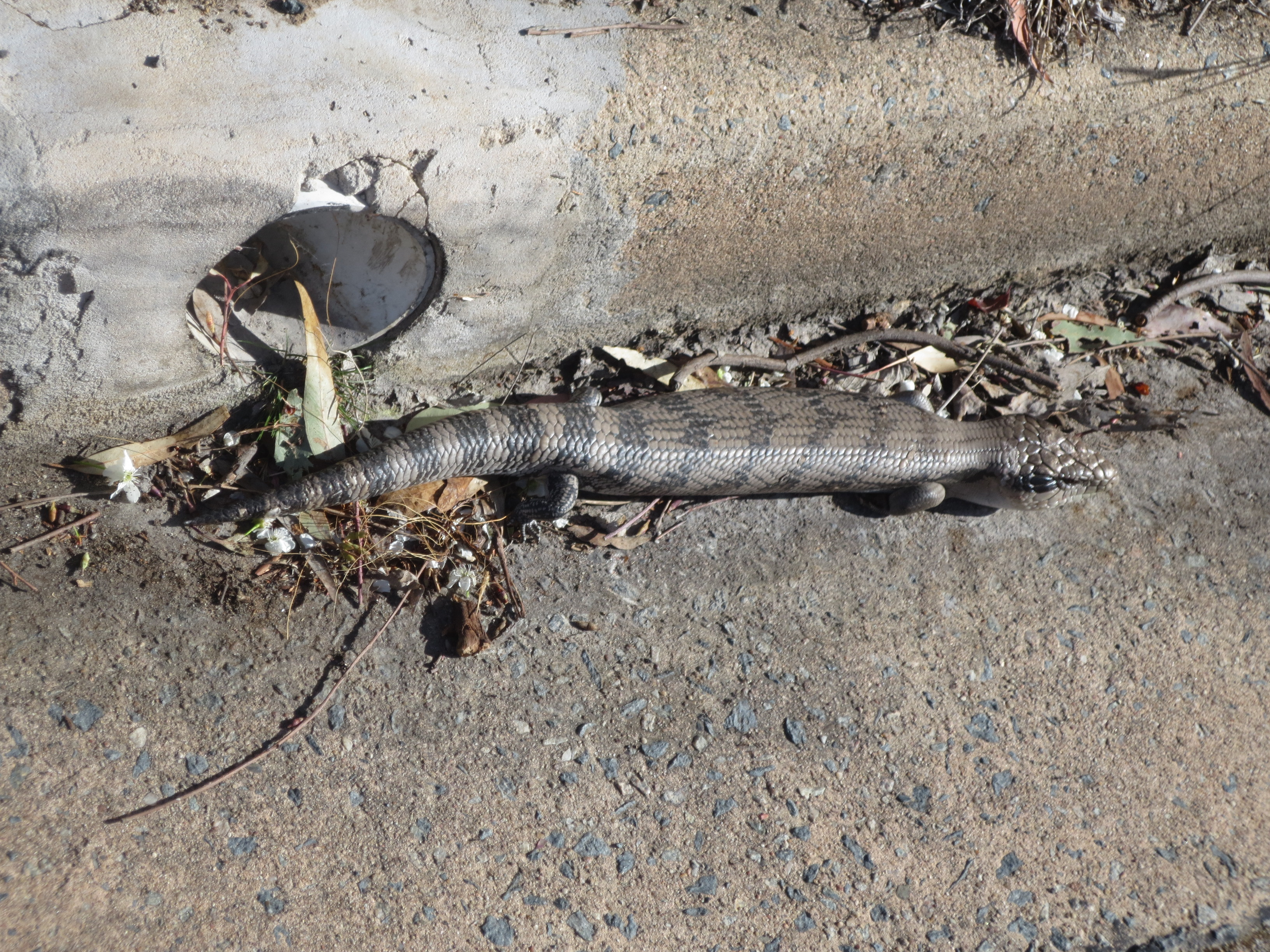
Blue tongue lizard
