= Torrens, Australian Capital Territory =

Torrens
- Suburb
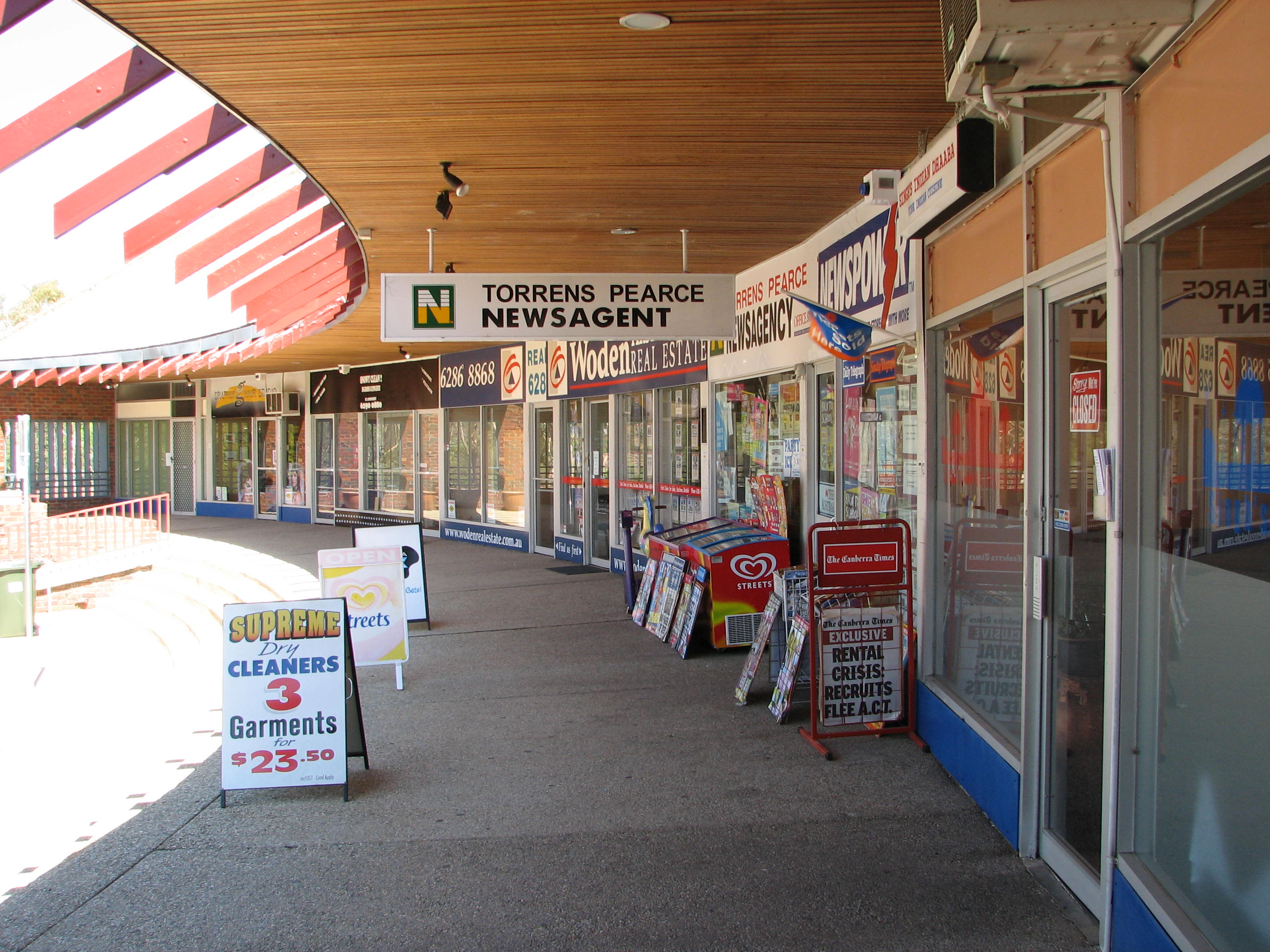
- Torrens shopping centre

- Coordinates: 35°22′22″S 149°05′14″E
- Country: Australia
- State: Australian Capital Territory
- City: Canberra
- District: Woden Valley
- Location: 15 km (9.3 mi) SSW of Canberra CBD; 18 km (11 mi) W of Queanbeyan; 105 km (65 mi) SW of Goulburn; 302 km (188 mi) SW of Sydney
- Established: 1966

Government
  - Territory electorate: Murrumbidgee
  - Federal division: Bean

Area
  - Total: 1.3 km^{2} (0.50 sq mi)
- Elevation: 646 m (2,119 ft)

Population
  - Total: 2,424 (SAL 2021)
- Postcode: 2607
Suburbs around Torrens
	Pearce
	Torrens	Mawson
Farrer	Canberra Nature Park

Torrens is a suburb in the Woden Valley district of Canberra, Australia. It is named after Sir Robert Torrens, a former Premier of South Australia and instigator of the Torrens title system of land registration. The suburb was gazetted on 12 May 1966.

== Location and description ==
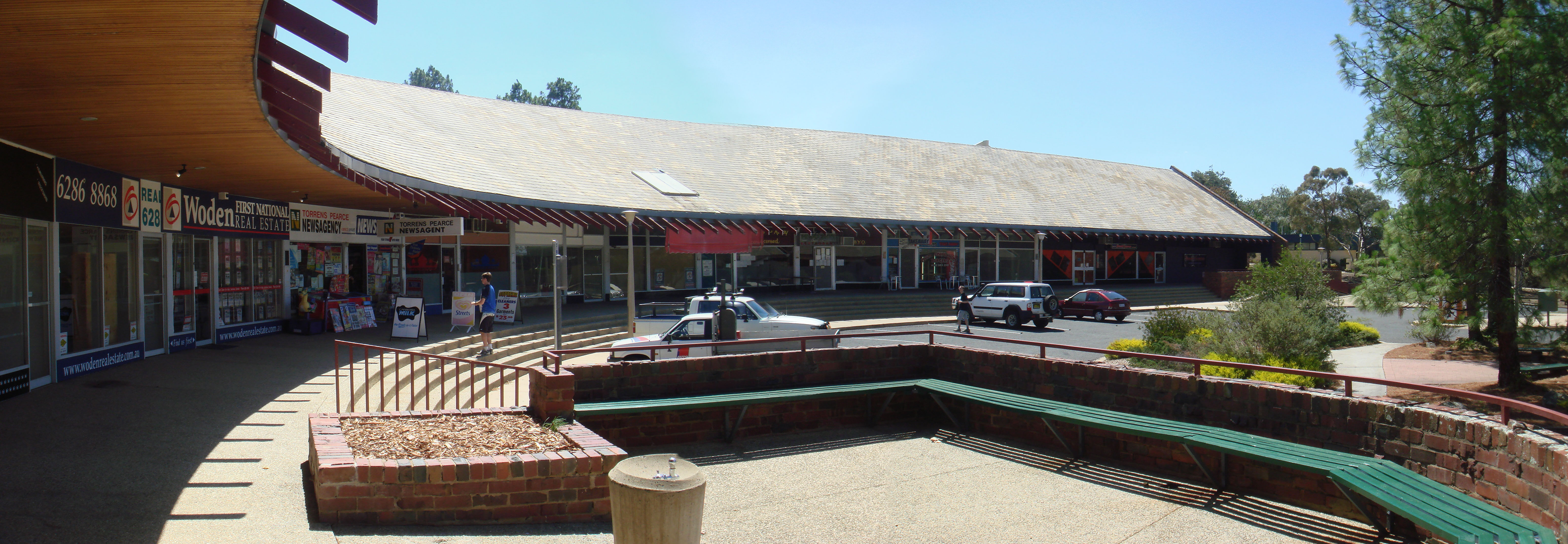
Panorama of Torrens shopping centre

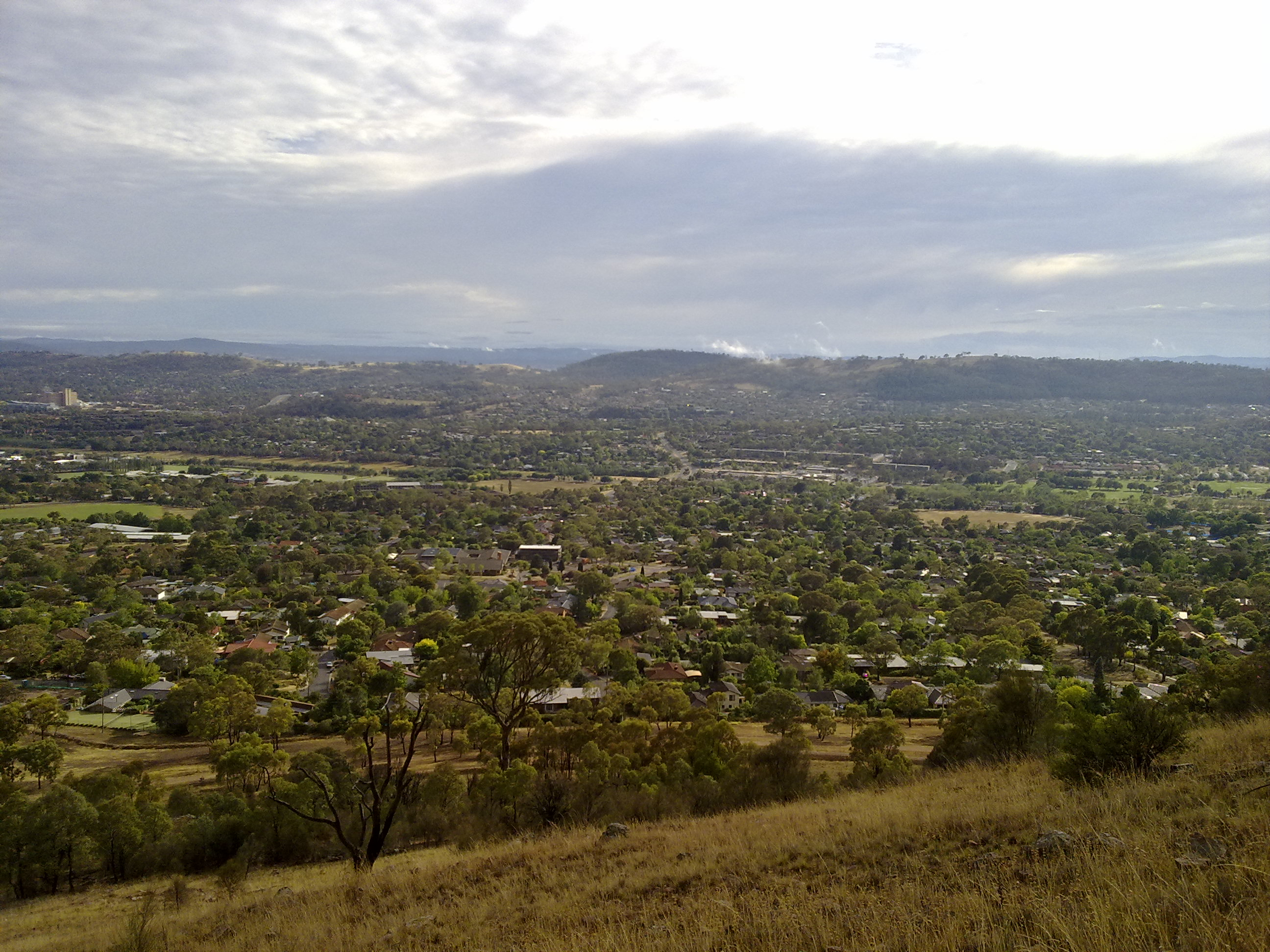
Looking toward Garran and O'Malley, from Mount Taylor in Torrens

The suburb is located along the district of Woden's southern edge. It adjoins the suburbs of Pearce, Mawson and Farrer. It is bounded by Beasley Street to the north, Athllon Drive to the east, and the Canberra Nature Park to the south. To the west the skyline is dominated by the Mount Taylor nature reserve.

Torrens contains a small shopping centre, a neighbourhood oval, and Torrens Primary School.

== History ==
The name was proposed by "contemporaries of Sir Robert Torrens; SA pioneers and politicians" and gazetted on 20 September 1928; the suburb was gazetted on 12 May 1966. Streets in Torrens are named after South Australian pioneers.

== Geology ==
Deakin Volcanics green-grey and purple rhyodacite is under the suburb, but only exposed in the south east quarter. The rest is covered by Quaternary alluvium. The south west has Deakin Volcanics green grey, purple and cream rhyolite with the corner topped off with Deakin Volcanics red-purple and green grey rhyodacite.
