= Pearce, Australian Capital Territory =

Pearce
- Suburb
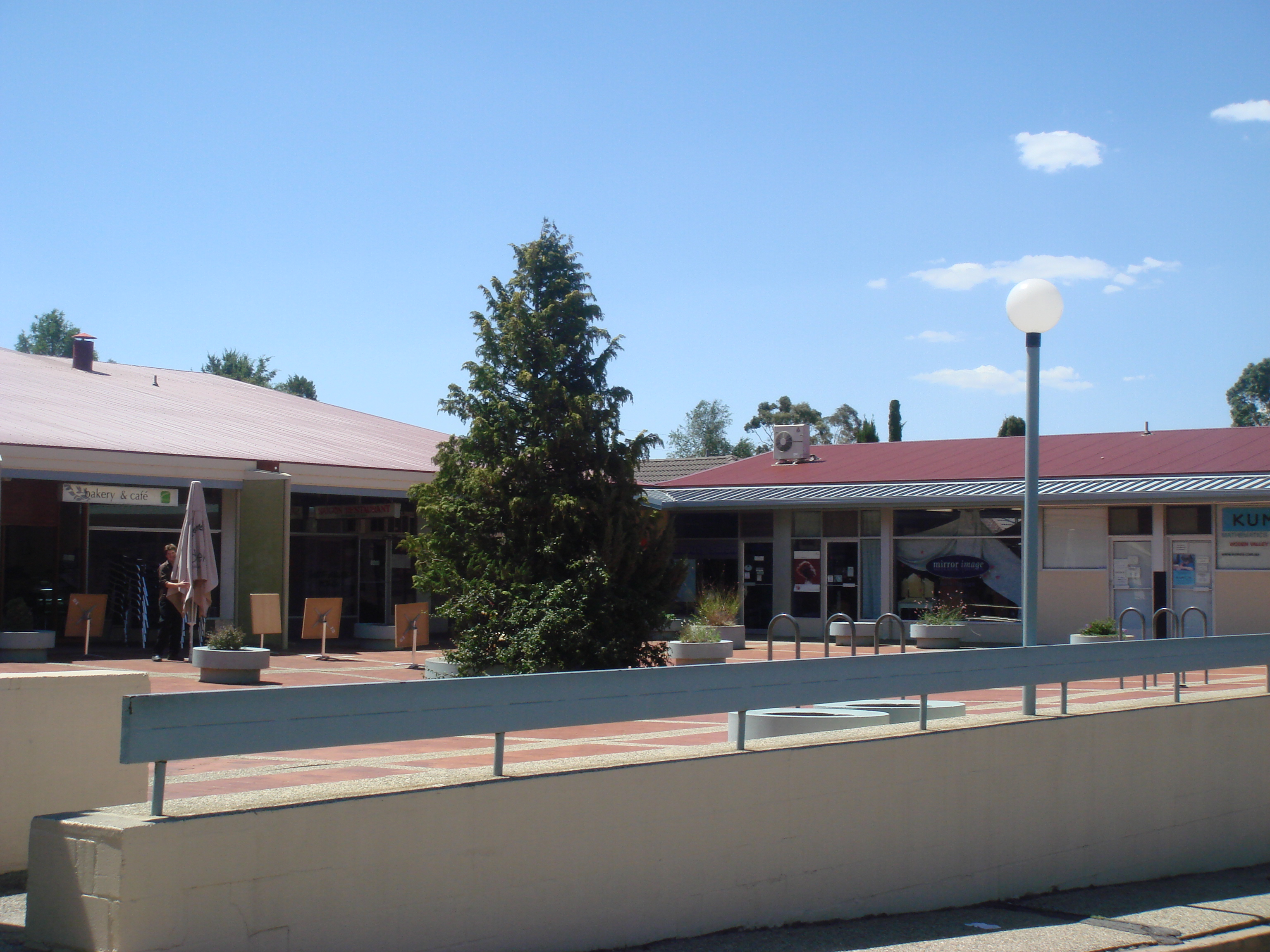
- Pearce shopping village

- Coordinates: 35.362°S 149.085°E
- Country: Australia
- State: Australian Capital Territory
- City: Canberra
- District: Woden Valley
- Location: 14 km (8.7 mi) SSW of Canberra CBD; 17 km (11 mi) W of Queanbeyan; 104 km (65 mi) SW of Goulburn; 301 km (187 mi) SW of Sydney
- Established: 1967

Government
  - Territory electorate: Murrumbidgee
  - Federal division: Bean

Area
  - Total: 1.7 km^{2} (0.66 sq mi)
- Elevation: 640 m (2,100 ft)

Population
  - Total: 2,687 (SAL 2021)
- Postcode: 2607
Suburbs around Pearce
Chifley	Chifley	Phillip
Canberra Nature Park	Pearce	Mawson
Canberra Nature Park	Torrens	Mawson

Pearce (/pɪərs/) is a suburb in the Canberra, Australia district of Woden. It was named after the longest-serving Senator and longest-serving Minister in Australia's federal history, Sir George Pearce.

Pearce adjoins the suburbs of Torrens, Mawson and Chifley. It is bordered by Beasley St to the south, Melrose and Athllon drives to the east and the Mount Taylor nature reserve to the west; a green corridor forms the northern border with Chifley. Located in the suburb are Marist College, Melrose High School and Sacred Heart Primary School, a shopping centre and a neighbourhood oval.

== Geology ==
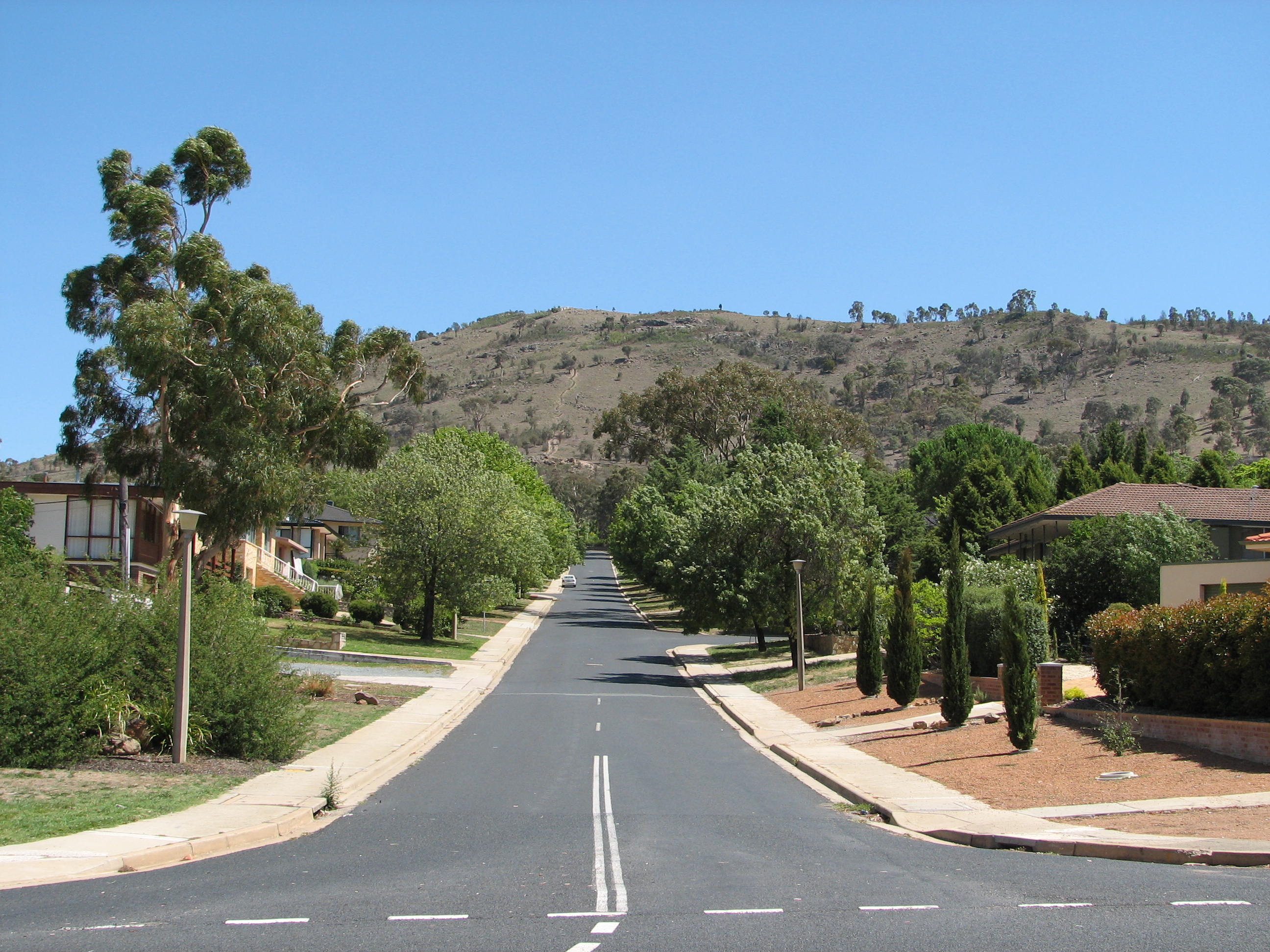
Looking up Parkhill Street, Pearce, towards Mount Taylor

Deakin Volcanics green-grey and purple rhyodacite is in the northern half and under Quaternary alluvium in the south. In the upper parts of the suburb are two patches of Deakin Volcanics green grey, purple and cream rhyolite. Further up Mount Taylor are Deakin Volcanics red-purple and green grey rhyodacite and porphyry.
