= Mawson, Australian Capital Territory =

Mawson
- Suburb
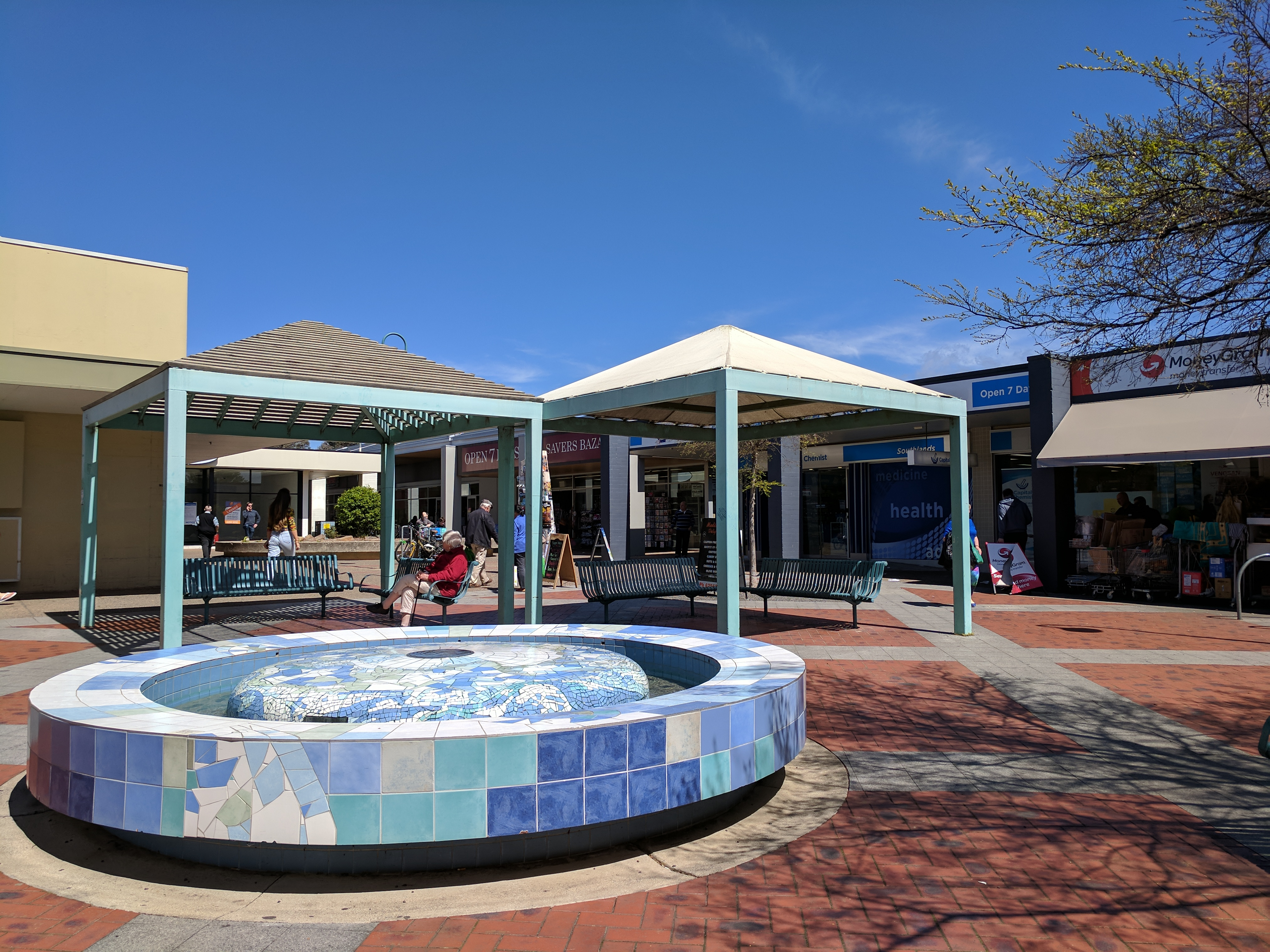
- Part of the Mawson/Southlands shopping centre

- Coordinates: 35°21′54″S 149°5′40″E
- Country: Australia
- State: Australian Capital Territory
- City: Canberra
- District: Woden Valley
- Location: 13 km (8.1 mi) SSW of Canberra CBD; 17 km (11 mi) W of Queanbeyan; 103 km (64 mi) SW of Goulburn; 300 km (190 mi) SW of Sydney
- Established: 1967

Government
  - Territory electorate: Murrumbidgee
  - Federal division: Bean

Area
  - Total: 2.1 km^{2} (0.81 sq mi)
- Elevation: 615 m (2,018 ft)

Population
  - Total: 3,440 (SAL 2021)
- Postcode: 2607
Suburbs around Mawson
Phillip	Phillip	Garran
Pearce	Mawson	Isaacs
Torrens	Farrer	Isaacs

Mawson (/mɔːsən/) is a suburb in the Canberra, Australia district of Woden Valley.

== History ==
The suburb was gazetted in 1966 and named after the Antarctic explorer Sir Douglas Mawson. The theme for street names is Antarctic exploration.

== Location ==
Mawson is next to the suburbs of Phillip, O'Malley, Isaacs, Farrer, Torrens and Pearce. It is bounded by Yamba Drive, Beasley Street and Athlon Drive. The neighbourhood of Swinger Hill on the other side of Ainsworth Street is often associated with Mawson but is in fact part of the suburb of Phillip.

== Suburb amenities ==
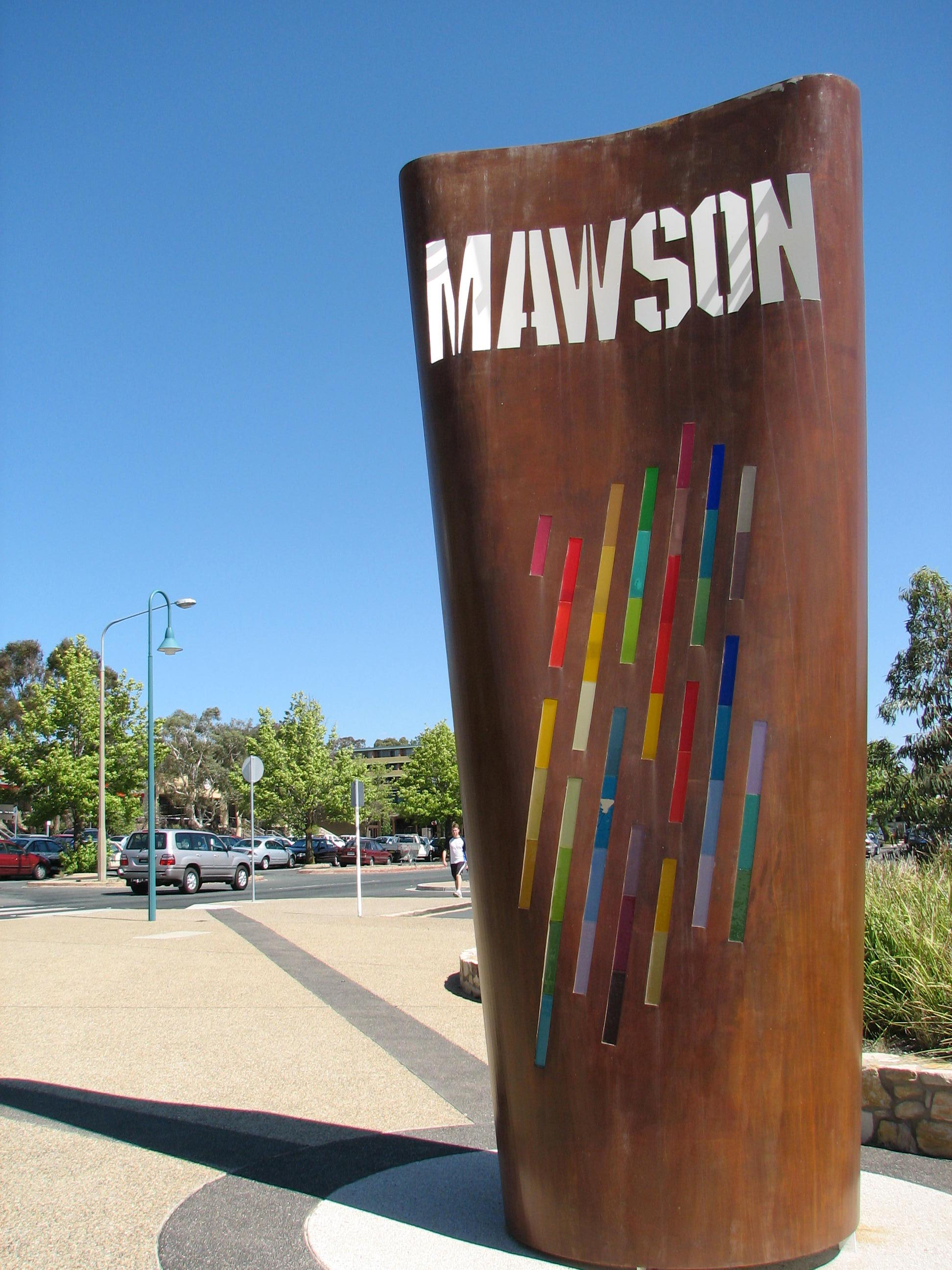
Sign outside Mawson/Southlands shopping centre

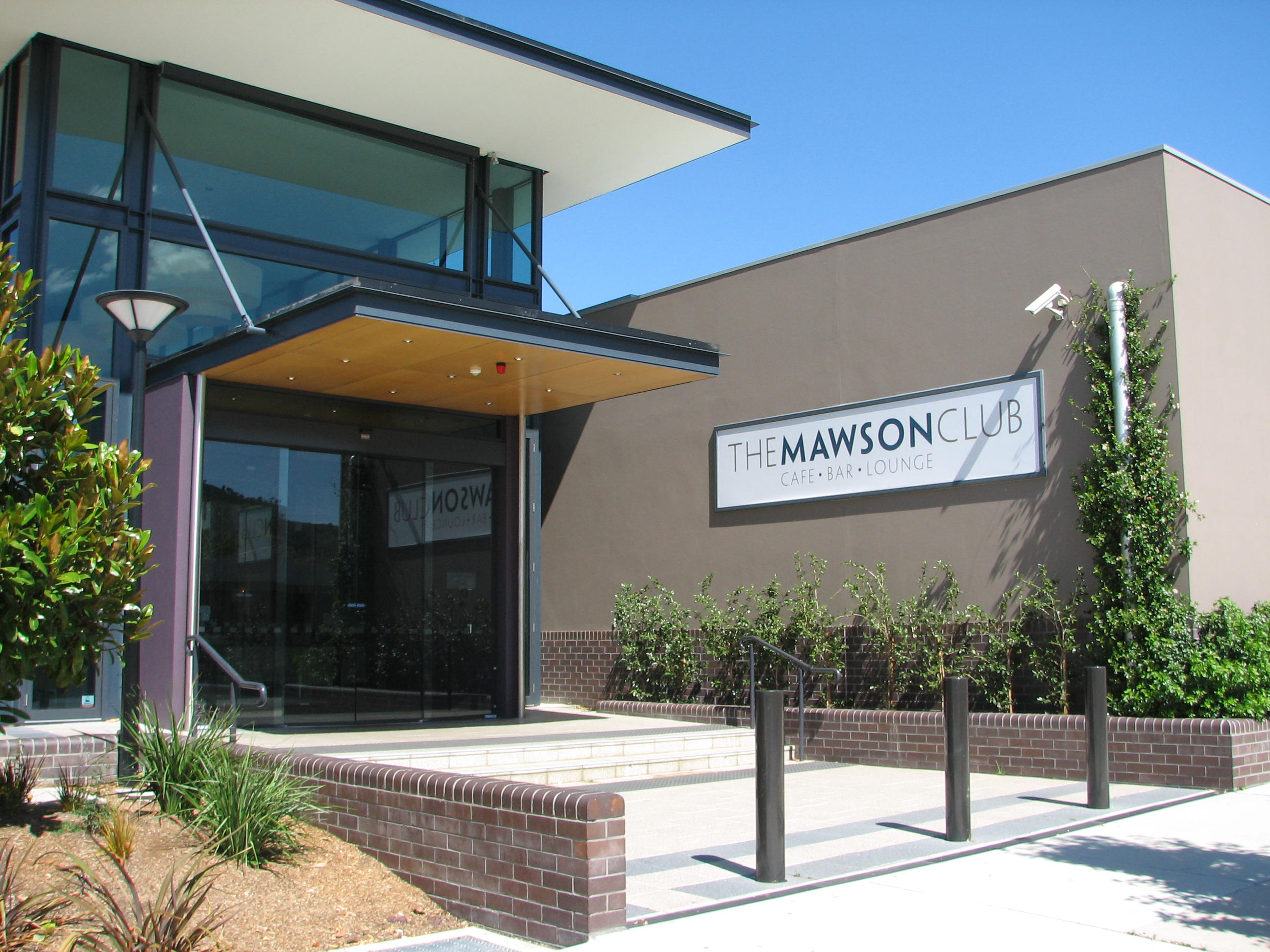
The Mawson Club

Southlands Centre is a commercial and retail centre located in Mawson. It contains a shopping centre, the Southlands Tennis Club, and a branch of the Canberra Raiders Leagues Club trading as The Mawson Club. Nearby are the Mawson district playing fields, Woden Golf Driving Range and Dyraaba Court Retirement Village. The Mandir Hindu Temple is located in the suburb. Other religious organisations include the Salvation Army Woden Valley Corps, a Seventh-day Adventist church, a New Apostolic Church, and the Australian headquarters for Gideons International.

== Geology ==
Deakin Volcanics green-gray and purple rhyodacite fill the suburb.

== Education ==
Mawson has two schools, Mawson Primary School and Canberra Christian School, both located on Ainsworth Street.

Mawson Primary School, established in 1968, had about 300 students in 2014, and 483 in 2018. It is notable for its Mandarin Immersion Program. The Chinese Australian Early Childhood Centre is located in the grounds of the school.

Canberra Christian School had an enrolment of 46 students in 2015. The school includes an early learning centre and a preschool. The school is part of the Seventh-day Adventist church.

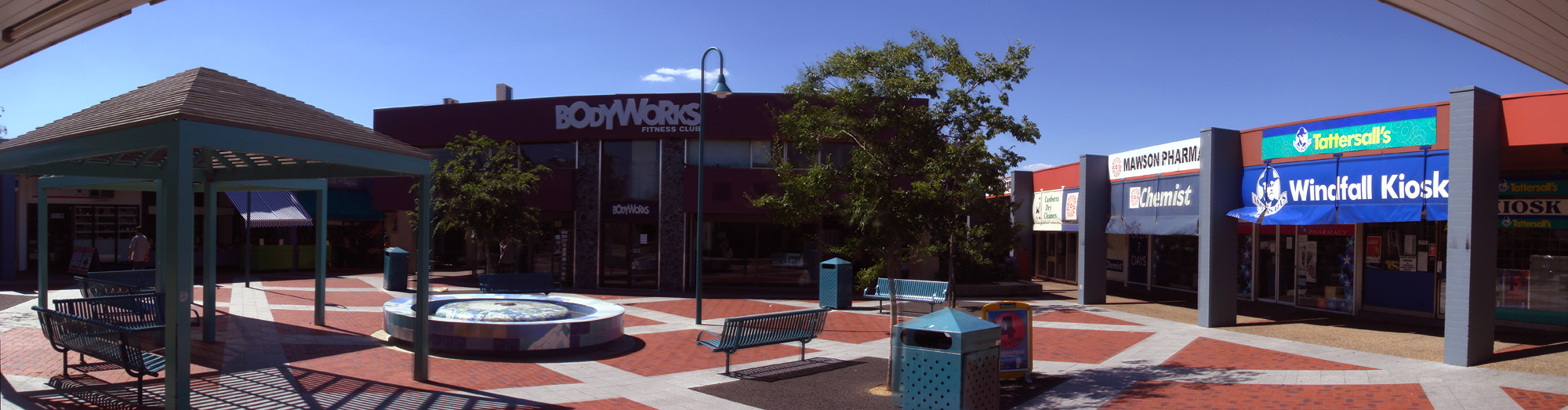
Mawson Shopping Centre Panorama
