= Erindale College =

Erindale College may refer to:

- Erindale College (Wanniassa, Australian Capital Territory), a secondary college
- Erindale College, the former name for the University of Toronto Mississauga in Mississauga, Ontario
