= Kambah =

- Suburb
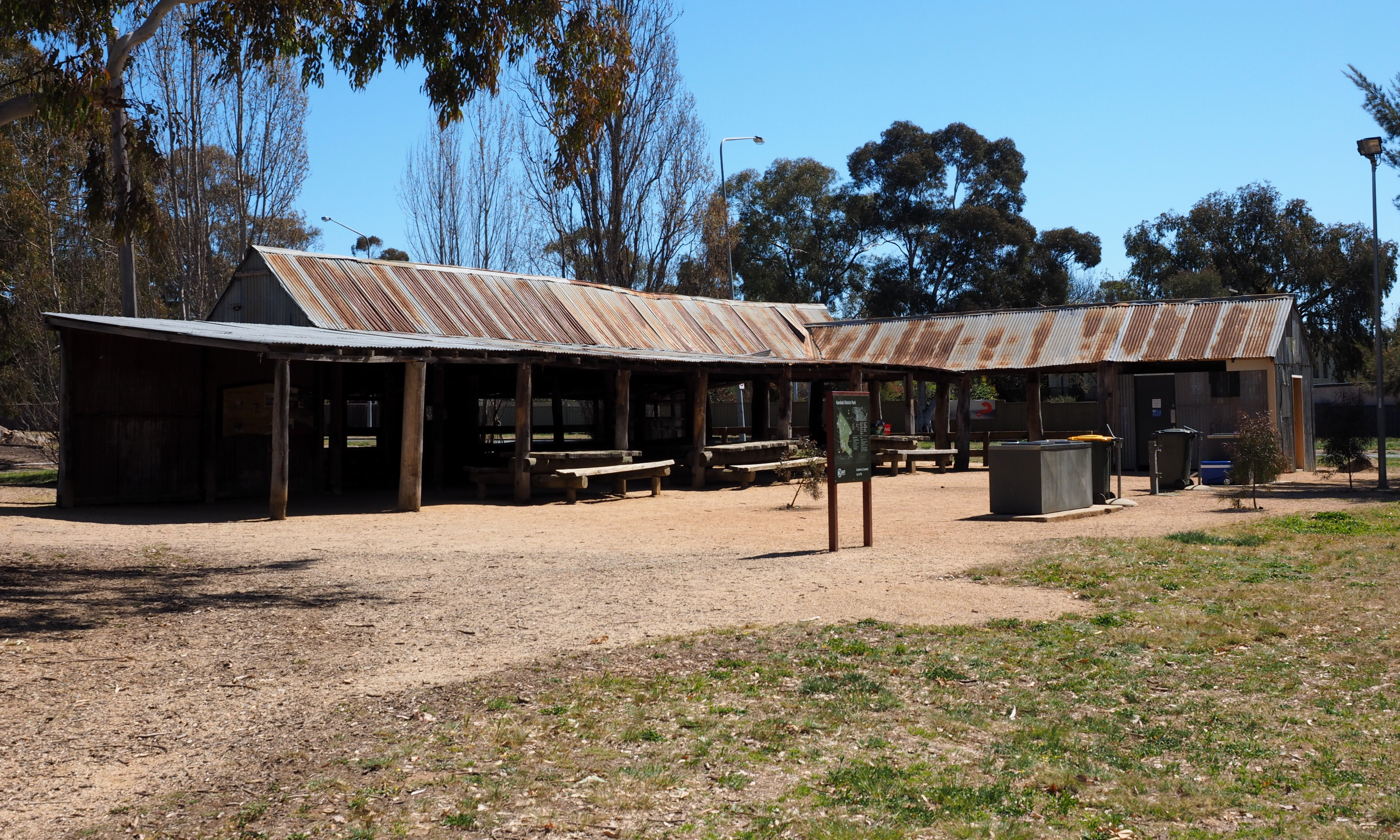
- One of the remaining buildings of Kambah Woolshed, now converted into a barbecue area

- Coordinates: 35.38629177419417°S 149.06126824371003°E
- Country: Australia
- State: Australian Capital Territory
- City: Canberra
- District: Tuggeranong
- Established: 1974

Government
  - Territory electorate: Brindabella
  - Federal division: Bean

Area
  - Total: 11.3 km^{2} (4.4 sq mi)

Population
  - Total: 15,670 (SAL 2021)
- Postcode: 2902
- Gazetted: 22 March 1973
Suburbs around Kambah
Chapman	Fisher	Mount Taylor
Canberra Nature Park	Kambah	Wanniassa
	Greenway	Wanniassa

Kambah (/ˈkæmbɑː/) is the northernmost suburb in the district of Tuggeranong, Canberra, Australia. It is located just south of Mount Taylor in the Canberra Nature Park. It is located north of the suburbs of Greenway and Wanniassa. It is bounded by Sulwood Drive to the north and Athllon Drive to the south-east.

Kambah was not designed according to the 'neighbourhood' philosophy guiding the design of other Canberra suburbs and is the largest suburb in Canberra with an area of 1130 ha. The suburb name was gazetted on 22 March 1973, and it was first settled in 1974 and consists predominantly of detached single-storey suburban houses. It was the first suburb in the satellite city of Tuggeranong. Kambah was named after the Kambah Homestead which was originally located in the Tuggeranong district. The name Kambah derives from Ngambri, the name of the clan that originally lived in the area before European occupation. The same word is the origin for the name Canberra. Streets in Kambah are named after Interstate pioneers, except for the Gleneagles estate, where they are named after Australian golfers and golf courses. Kambah was "formerly Village Creek".

== Recreation ==
The Murrumbidgee Country Club is located in Kambah, and Kambah also has three district playing fields and a tennis club. The Kambah Pony Club and Vikings BMX Park are located in the north of the suburb. Kambah has two Scout halls, and the Kambah Woolshed is located in the suburb.

== Shopping centres ==
Located in the north of the suburb is the group centre Kambah Village Shopping Centre. It has a supermarket, service station, hotel, club, pub and many small shops and businesses. Located in the south of the suburb is the Kambah Centre, a medium-sized community centre with a health centre, a storage facility, a service station, an indoor sports facility, two Buddhist centres, a Jehovah's Witnesses centre, and a small shopping corner. Kambah also has smaller local centres scattered around the suburb.

== Churches ==
Several churches are located in Kambah; Arawang Anglican, formerly St. Stephen's Anglican Church, St. Thomas Catholic Church, the Southside Bible Church, formerly the Christian City Church, formerly the Tuggeranong Baptist Church, and Parkway, renamed to Eternity Church, and then renamed to Awaken.

In 2017, St. Stephen's Anglican Church amalgamated with All Soul's Anglican Church, Chapman and became Arawang Anglican, named for the mountain in-between the two. Arawang Anglican continues to meet in the St. Stephen's building on the corner of Marconi Crescent and Kett Street in Kambah.

On 17 June 2017, the Tuggeranong Baptist Church and its op shop were destroyed by fire due to arson.

In 2007, Parkway (now AWAKEN Church), an Apostolic Church, established a new building in Kambah. The church had lost its original building in Holder during the 2003 Canberra bushfires. The new building caused some controversy, as the architectural designed complex was built on what had been open grassland next to the fire station, and in a very prominent location on the Tuggeranong Parkway. Southside Bible Church began meeting at Namadgi School in January 2016.

== Education ==
Originally, four public primary schools operated in Kambah: Mount Neighbour Primary School, Taylor Primary School, Urambi Primary School and Village Creek Primary School. Under the ACT Government's Towards 2020 plan, Mount Neighbour Primary closed at the end of the 2006 school year with Village Creek Primary following at the end of 2007. The Learning Support Unit relocated from Mount Neighbour to Urambi Primary School at the end of 2006 and the Tuggeranong Primary Introductory English Centre relocated from Village Creek Primary School to Urambi Primary School at the end of 2007. The preschools associated with Mount Neighbour Primary and Village Creek Primary will develop relationships with Urambi Primary and Taylor Primary respectively; Village Creek Preschool closed at the end of 2010. Urambi Primary School closed at the end of 2010.

Kambah High School was a secondary school for years 7-10. It had Kambah and Greenway as its main intake area. At the end of 2007, the school educated around 140 students and employed around 20 staff. Kambah High was also closed at the conclusion of the 2007 school year as part of the ACT's Towards 2020 education reforms, having operated for 31 years. Kambah High and Urambi Primary were replaced by Namadgi School, a P-10 school built in 2011.

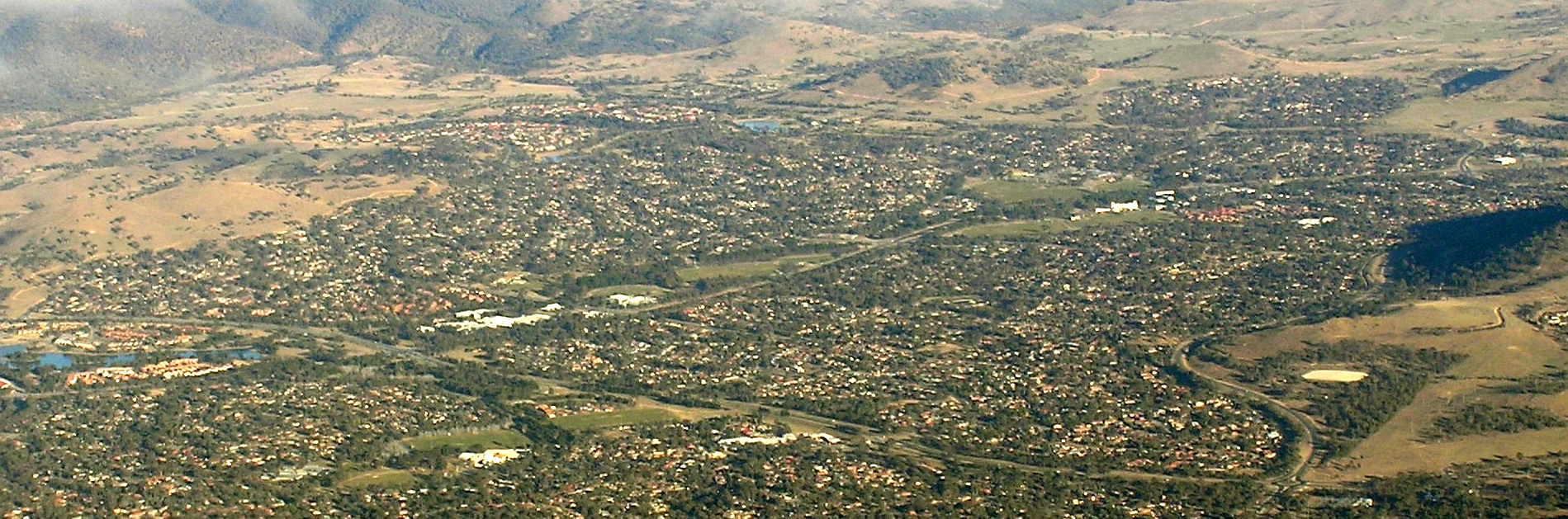
Aerial photo from east

In addition to public education, St. Thomas the Apostle Primary School is located in Kambah. St Thomas the Apostle Primary opened in 1977, and is a systemic Catholic primary school, under the direction of the Canberra Goulburn Catholic Education Office. St Thomas the Apostle Primary is attached to the St Thomas the Apostle Parish.

== Physical features ==
West of Kambah is the Murrumbidgee River, one of Australia's major rivers. Surrounding hills include Mount Taylor, Arawang Hill, Mount Neighbour, McQuoids Hill, Forster Hill on the north side, and Urambi Hills on the south-west side. Most of Kambah is occupied by the Village Creek Valley, but it also extends into Allens Creek and McQuoids Creek Valleys closer to the Murrumbidgee.

On the Murrumbidgee, itself is the Red Rocks Gorge and Kambah Pool, a swimming hole. Kambah is home to many different types of fish (particularly carp) and mammals.

=== Geology ===
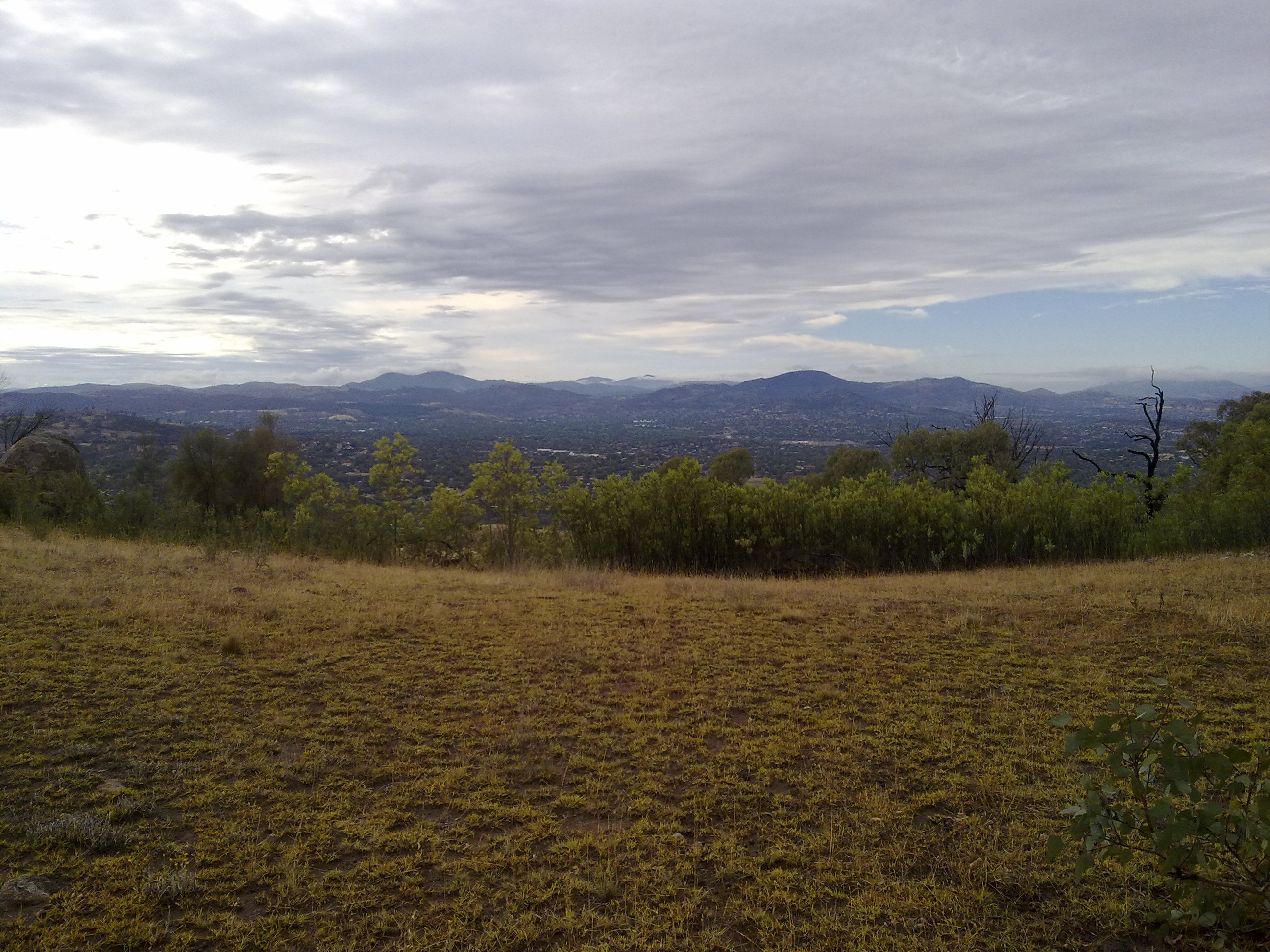
Kambah as viewed from Mount Taylor to the north

Kambah is underlain by Silurian volcanics. Rhyodacitic ignimbrite in the form of grey rhyodacitic and dacitic crystal tuff is under most of Kambah apart from the eastern corner. These are Laidlaw Volcanics aged 420.7±2.2 mya of Ludlow Age. In the east of Kambah alongside Athllon Drive can be found green-grey, purple and cream rhyolite, agglomerate, purple tuff or rhyodacite. In a band just to the west of this is red-purple and green-grey rhyodacite. This material is from the Deakin Volcanics and is older than the Laidlaw Volcanics. Also around Kambah on some of the hills are outcroppings of a coarse pink-brown rhyodacitic intrusion of porphyry. These intrusions can be found on Neighbour Hill, Forster Hill, McQuoids Hill, and the east and south-east of Mount Taylor also around Menzie Place and another patch around the south of Mount Neighbour preschool. These intrusions were likely the necks of volcanoes that erupted the other tuff and dacite in the area.

A Cenozoic age dyke of teschenite intrudes the Laidlaw ignimbrite in the Kambah Pool and Red Rocks Gorge area.

Quaternary alluvium covers the ground around the upper reaches of Village Creek, around Drakeford Drive. A fault runs from the north-west in Allchin Circuit to the south-east under Urambi primary school.
