= Melrose High School (Canberra) =

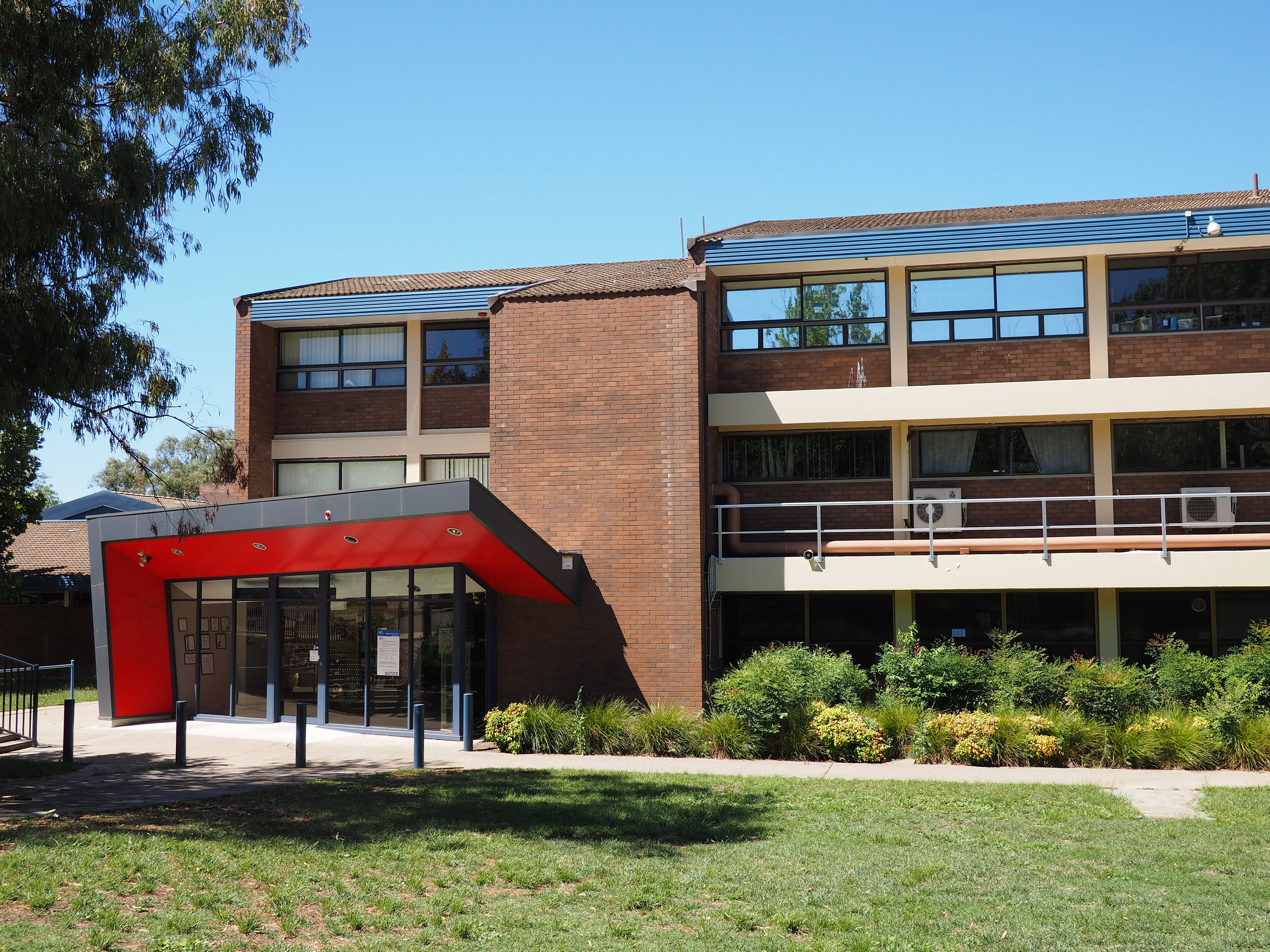
- The entrance to Melrose High School's main building

Location
- Pearce, Canberra
- Coordinates: 35.363°S 149.090°E

Information
- Type: Public
- Established: 1970
- Principal: Diana Whymark
- Grades: 7–10
- Website: Link

Melrose High School is a government school located in the Canberra suburb of Pearce. It serves years 7 through to 10. The school's name is taken from an old property that was located in the Woden area, which in turn was named after the town called Melrose in Scotland. The school was opened on 27 January 1970 and had its 50th anniversary in 2020. Melrose High School serves 823 students (as of 2023). The school has a number of outdoor sporting facilities such as a large oval, a mountain bike track, and tennis and netball courts. It also has a synthetic soccer pitch.

== Buildings ==
Melrose High School is made up of several different buildings. The main building is three storeys high and appears from above in the rough shape of an "H". The main building is adjoined by a large library. To the front of the main building is another building, dedicated only to science labs. This building has entrances at two ends, and a large corridor up the middle with the laboratories on either side.

Closer to the school's oval, but still partially surrounded by the main building is the canteen. Inside is a large open area where students can stand or sit whilst eating. Along the back wall of the canteen, there are change rooms, the canteen was renovated in 2008 so as to increase the space in the building and to raise the quality of the facilities. Tables and chairs were added to the canteen as of mid-2008. Another building is the hall, which is located next to the school's main car park.

The hall is a large stand-alone building containing a stage, which is used during school assemblies. In 2010, $200,000 was spent on the refurbishment of the hall. This included the installation of two data projectors and automatic screens, a new 8500 watt "cinema-like" sound reinforcement system, speakers and a lighting bar.

In early 2006, a new security fence surrounding the school was installed after too many windows were broken by vandals. In 2018, the fence was expanded to encompass the school's oval.

Also, a gym which is located between the main building and the tennis courts was opened on 17 May 2007. It holds two smaller Basketball courts or one full-sized court, a Futsal court as well as Volleyball and Netball facilities. The gym also contains a set of change rooms, bathrooms and a rock climbing wall.

== See also ==
- List of schools in the Australian Capital Territory
