= Isaacs, Australian Capital Territory =

Isaacs
- Suburb
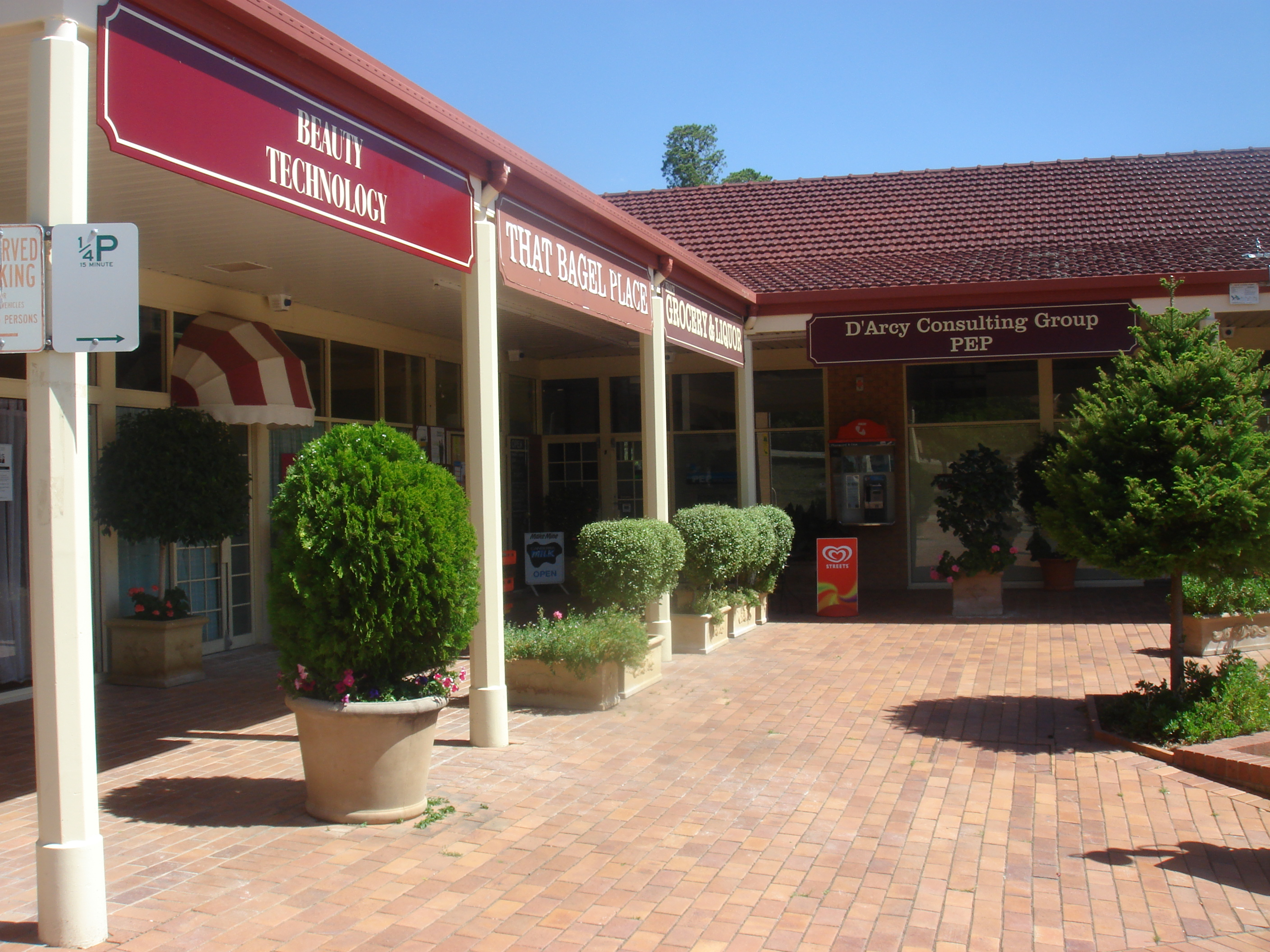
- Isaacs shopping centre

- Coordinates: 35°22′03″S 149°06′41″E
- Country: Australia
- State: Australian Capital Territory
- City: Canberra
- District: Woden Valley
- Location: 14 km (8.7 mi) S of Canberra CBD; 16 km (9.9 mi) W of Queanbeyan; 103 km (64 mi) SW of Goulburn; 300 km (190 mi) SW of Sydney
- Established: 1986

Government
  - Territory electorate: Murrumbidgee
  - Federal division: Bean

Area
  - Total: 3.1 km^{2} (1.2 sq mi)
- Elevation: 659 m (2,162 ft)

Population
  - Total: 2,379 (2021 census)
  - Density: 767/km^{2} (1,990/sq mi)
- Postcode: 2607
Suburbs around Isaacs
Phillip	O'Malley
Mawson	Isaacs
Farrer

Isaacs (/aɪzæks/ EYE-zaks) is a suburb in the district of Woden in Canberra, Australian Capital Territory.

The suburb was gazetted as a Division Name on 12 May 1966 but residential housing was not built until the late 1980s. Isaacs is next to the suburbs of O'Malley, Mawson and Farrer. It is bounded by Yamba Drive and Ngunawal Drive. Located in the suburb is the Canberra Nature Park of Isaacs Ridge and the Long Gully pine plantation.

The suburb is named after Sir Isaac Isaacs (1855–1948), politician, Chief Justice and the first Australian-born Governor-General of Australia (1931–1936).

== Demographics ==
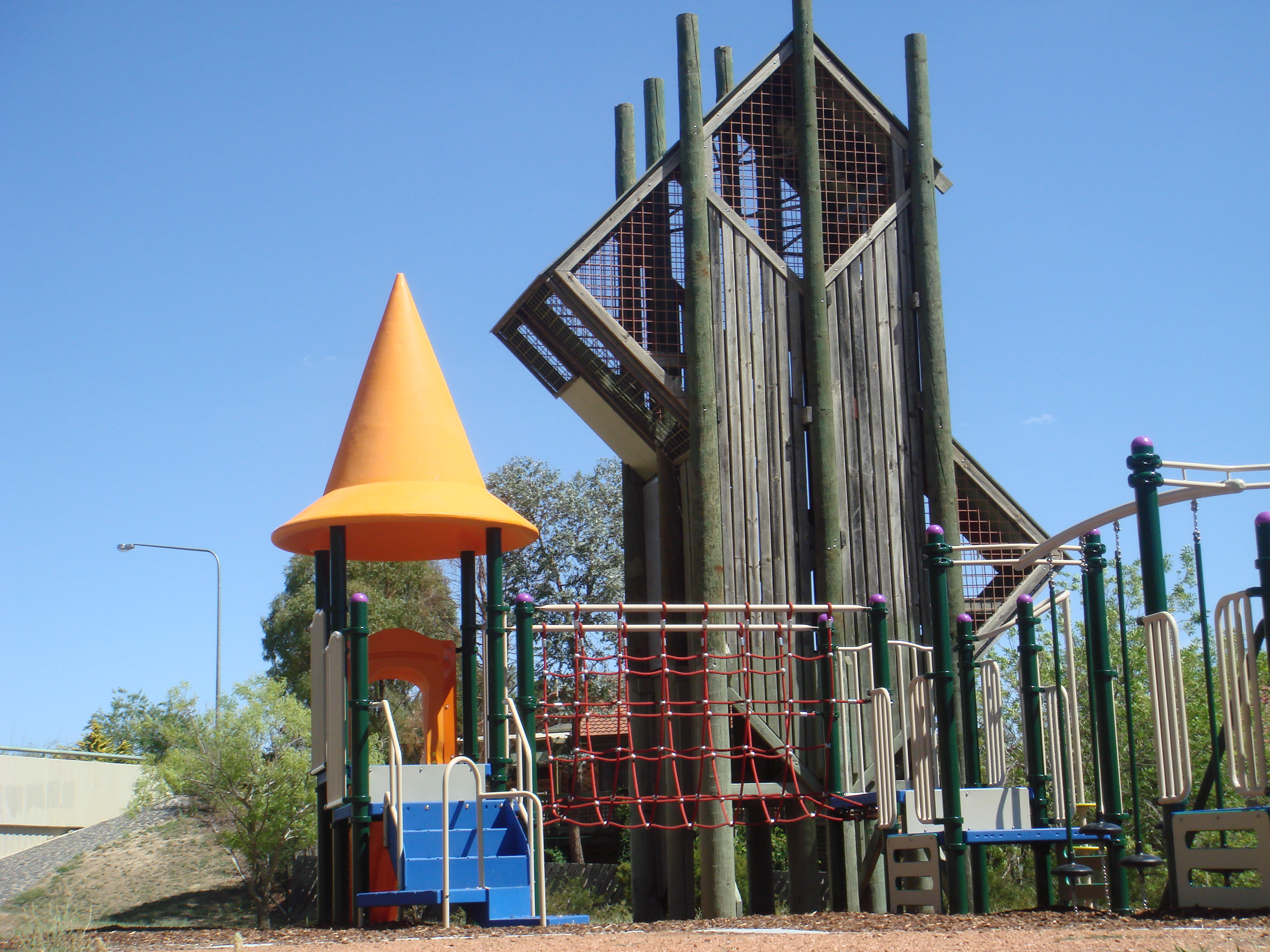
Playground near the Isaacs shops

In the 2021 census, the population of Isaacs was 2,379, including 40 (1.7%) Indigenous persons and 1,466 (61.6%) Australian-born persons.

== Theme for streets ==
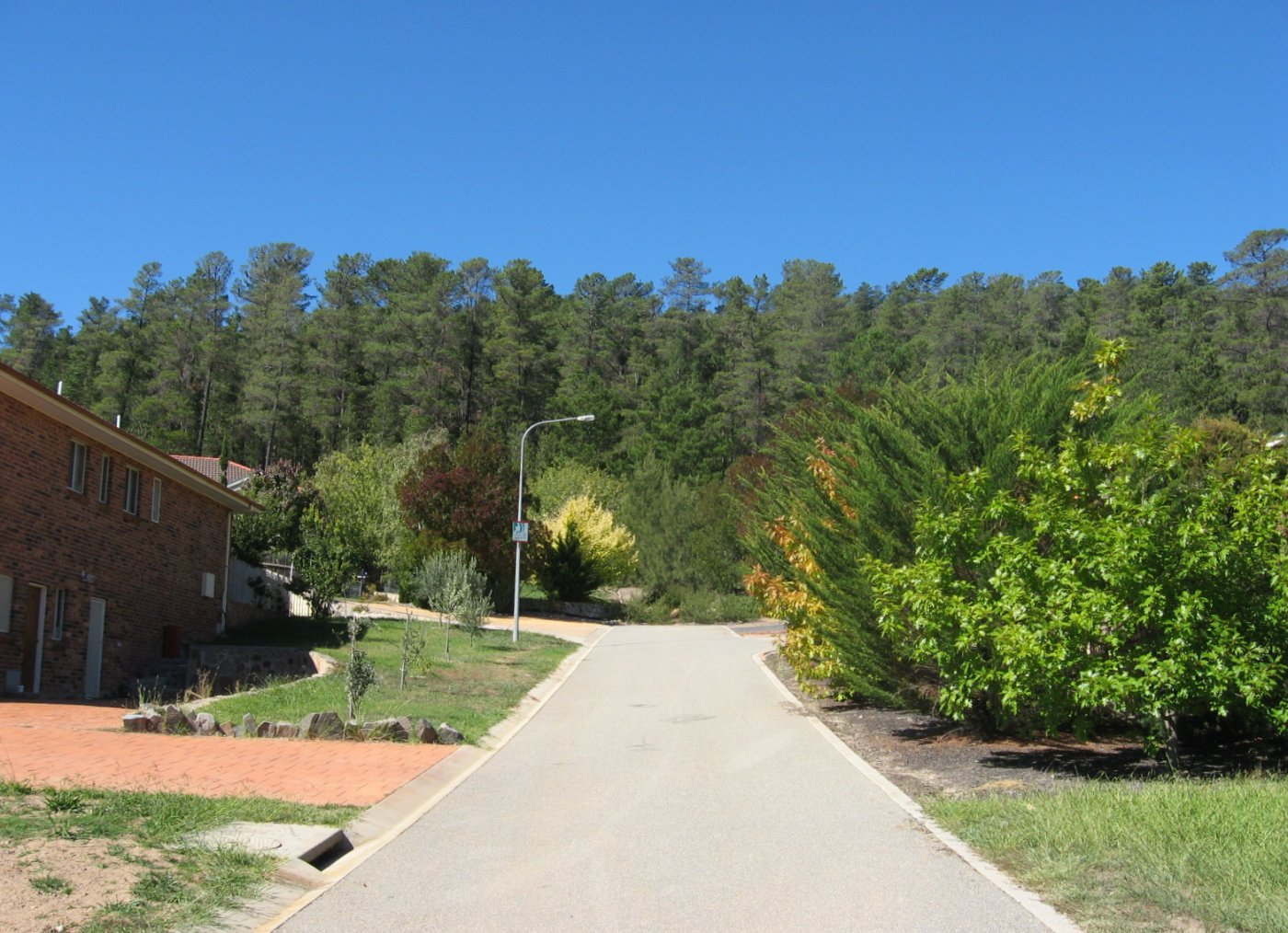
Typical cul-de-sac in Isaacs

The suburb's theme is 'educationists': the streets are therefore named after people associated with Australian education. Some of the main streets in Isaacs, and their honorees, are:

- Alexander Mackie Circuit: Alexander Mackie (1876–1955), academic who was first principal of the Sydney Teacher Training College and first Professor of Education at the University of Sydney (New South Wales)
- Buntine Crescent: Walter Murray Buntine (1866–1953), teacher and campaigner for public education (Victoria)
- Dorsch Street: Agnes Maria Johanna Dorsch (1871–1958), private teacher at Government House; teacher at Concordia College, 1923-43
- Julia Flynn Avenue: Julia Teresa Flynn (1878–1947), secondary school teacher and school inspector (Victoria)
- Maclagan Street: James B Maclagan (d. 1865), educationist who pioneered correspondence education (Western Australia)
- Rowntree Crescent: Amy Rowntree, OBE (1885–1962), teacher, school inspector and historian (Tasmania)
- Whitty Crescent: Ellen Whitty (Rev Mother Vincent) (1819–1892), social worker and missionary who established 26 Mercy schools and teacher training colleges (Queensland)
- William Wilkins Crescent: William Wilkins (1827–1892), educational reformer and administrator, including Principal of Fort Street Model School (New South Wales)

== Geology ==
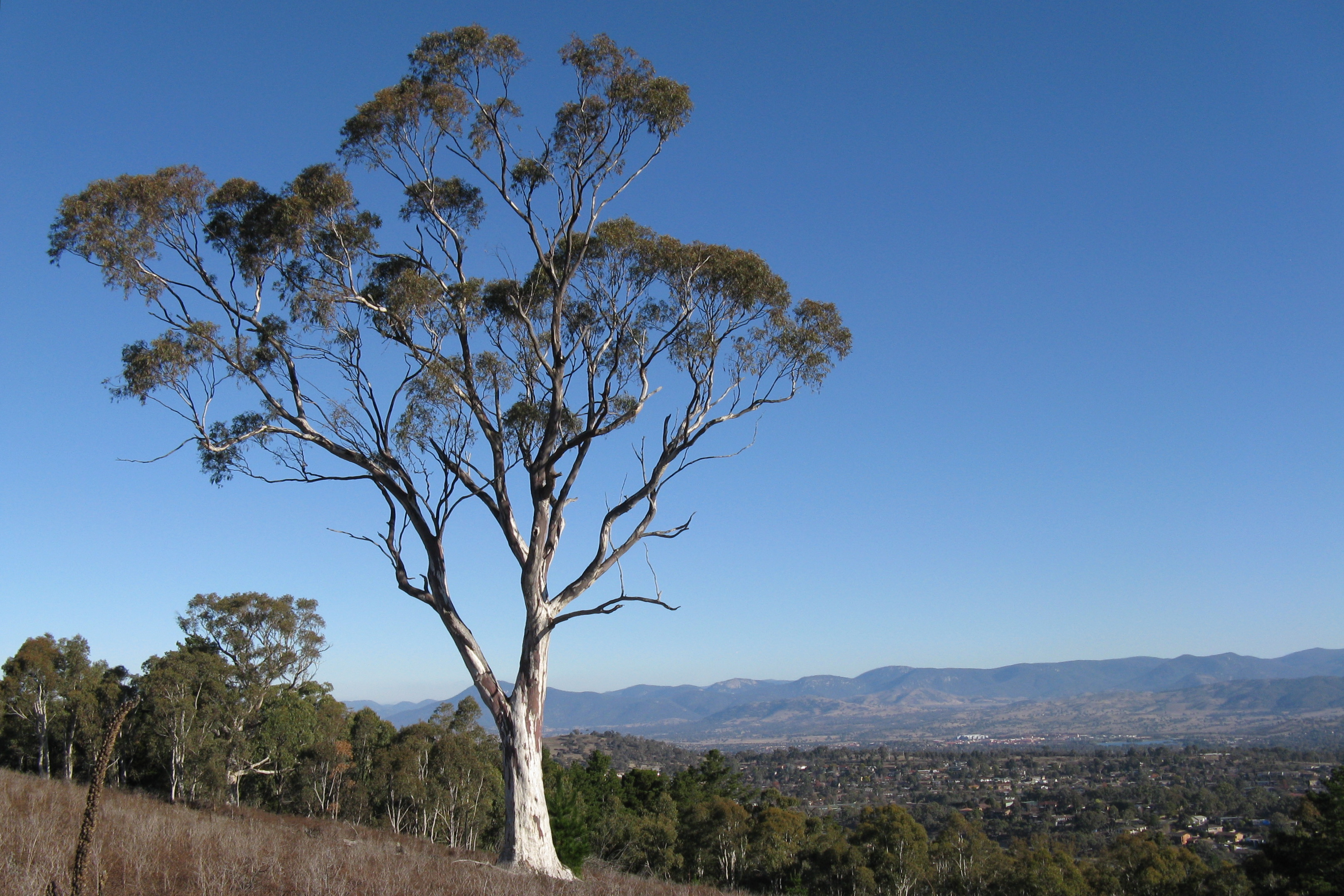
Isaacs and environs, taken from Isaacs Ridge

Isaacs is built on Silurian age Deakin Volcanics. These are green-grey and purple coloured rhyodacite. The lower lying parts of the suburb are covered with Quaternary alluvium on top. Isaacs ridge has the same outcrops as the rest of the suburb.
