= Downer, Australian Capital Territory =

Suburb of Canberra, Australia

Downer
- Suburb
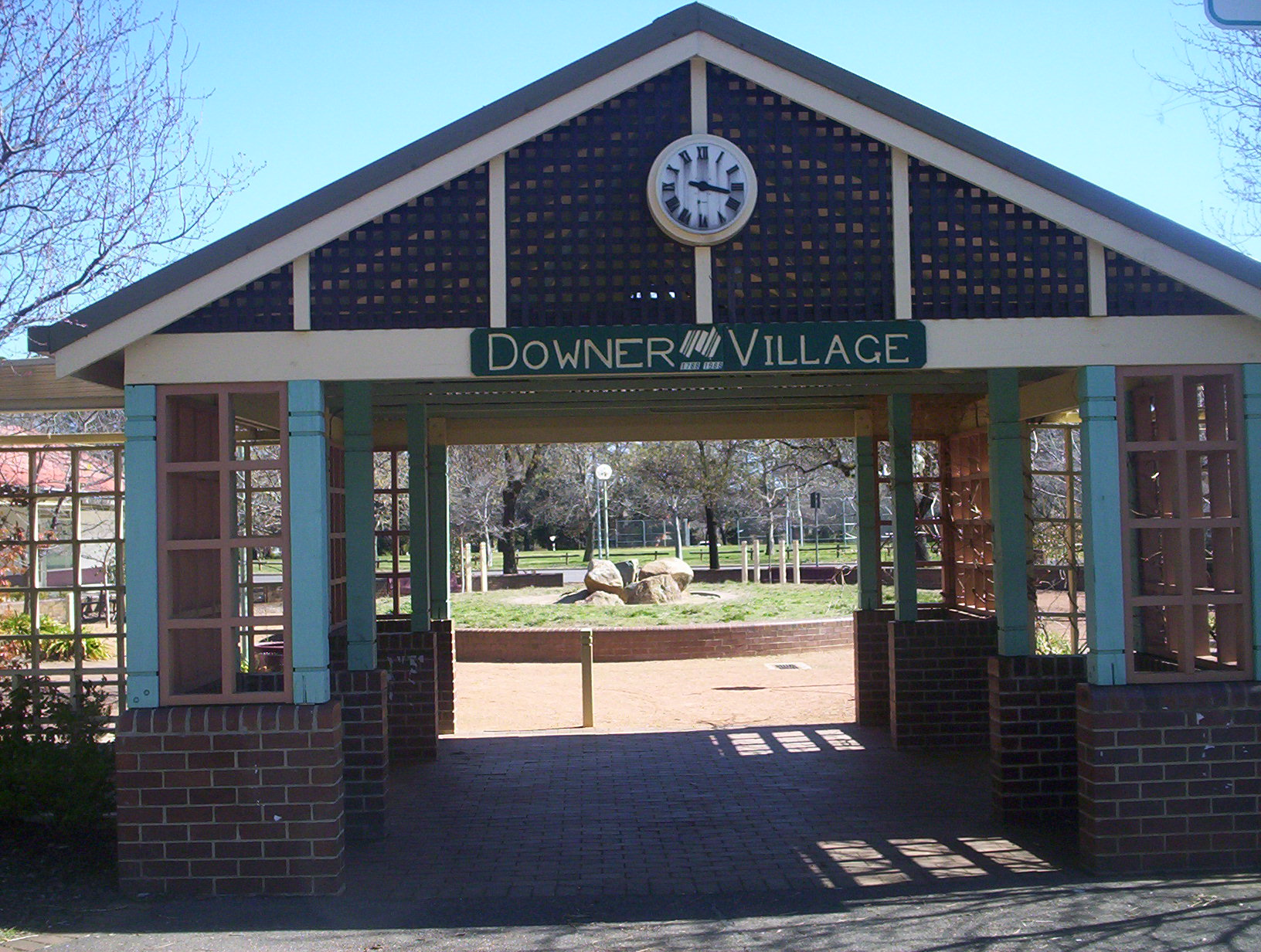
- Downer shops c. 2005

- Coordinates: 35°14′39″S 149°08′42″E
- Country: Australia
- State: Australian Capital Territory
- City: Canberra
- District: North Canberra
- Location: 5 km (3.1 mi) NNE of Canberra CBD; 19 km (12 mi) NW of Queanbeyan; 85 km (53 mi) SW of Goulburn; 282 km (175 mi) SW of Sydney
- Established: 1960

Government
  - Territory electorate: Kurrajong
  - Federal division: Canberra

Area
  - Total: 1.6 km^{2} (0.62 sq mi)
- Elevation: 587 m (1,926 ft)

Population
  - Total: 4,296 (SAL 2021)
- Postcode: 2602
Suburbs around Downer
Lyneham	Lyneham	Watson
Lyneham	Downer	Watson
Lyneham	Dickson	Dickson

Downer is a suburb of Canberra, Australia, in the city's inner north. The suburb is bounded by Northbourne Avenue, Antill Street and Philip Avenue.

The suburb was gazetted in 1960 and named after Sir John Downer (1843–1915) Premier of South Australia and a member of the first Australian Senate in 1901. There is no specific theme for street names.

== History ==
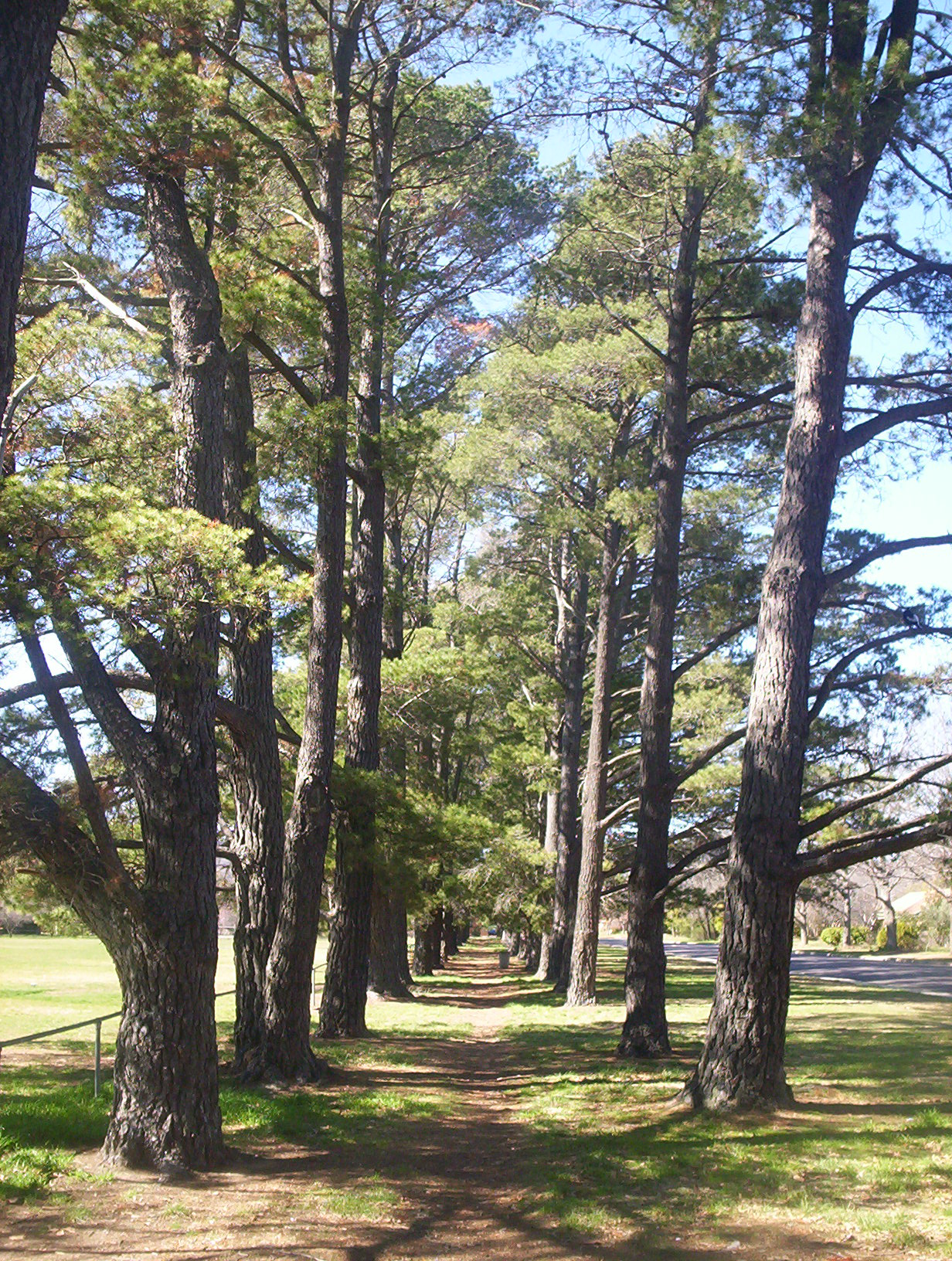
Pine trees at Downer Oval which date back to the CSIRO facility in the 1940s

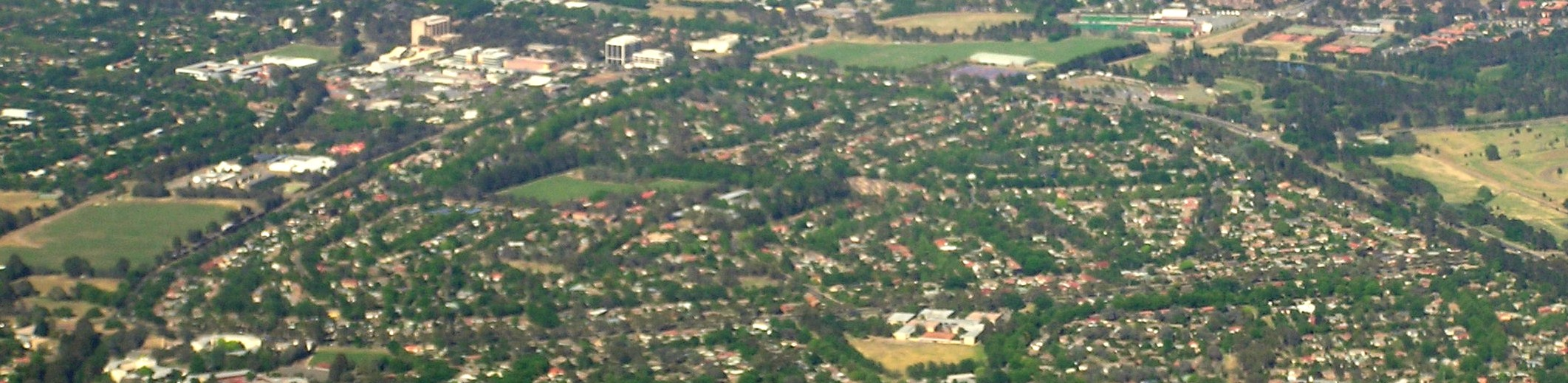
Aerial view of Downer from north east

The buildings which make up the Downer community centre and shops, were built for the CSIRO in 1930s, and the area now comprising Downer was an agricultural research facility for the CSIRO. The facility was used between 1939 and 1945 as a plantation for the growth of opium poppy to provide a source for medications in the unavailability of imported supplies. The large pine and gum trees which surround the block around the shops were planted in this time as a wind break for the CSIRO building. Large trees (Camden Woolybutts) along Swinden Street were also planted then, as Swinden Street was the driveway for the CSIRO building, where it connected to Northbourne Avenue. With the development of the suburb, the trees became diseased during the 1980s and a program is underway to replace them with more amenable local varieties of gum. As of September 2008, all but two or three of the older Swinden Street gums have been removed.

Downer has a local oval between Frencham, Melba, Bonython and Bradfield Streets, with a shopping centre. However, in 2005 the shopping centre was vacant due partly to the poor location of the centre away from major roads. The shops were refurbished in the late 2010s, with a new cafe and vet clinic. In May 2019 a bronze kangaroo sculpture was unveiled, to replace a previous kangaroo sculpture which went missing six years earlier.

Nearby, the Canberra Business Centre until recently occupied the site of the former Downer Primary School. The school closed in 1988. As of 2026 the building has been replaced with apartments and a retirement village.

== Geology ==
Calcareous shales from the Canberra Formation is overlain by Quaternary alluvium. This rock is the limestone of the original title of Canberra "Limestone Plains".

== Politics ==
2025 House election
Labor	41.42%
Greens	34.66%
Liberal	11.55%
Independent	8.71%
2025 Senate election
Pocock	46.45%
Labor	24.66%
Greens	14.68%
Liberal	9.74%
2024 ACT election
Labor	33.5%
Greens	27.5%
Liberal	16.0%
IFC	13.3%

Downer is located within the federal electorate of Canberra and it is represented by Alicia Payne for the Labor Party. In the ACT Legislative Assembly, Downer is part of the electorate of Kurrajong, which elects five members on the basis of proportional representation, two Labor, one Green, one Liberal and one Independent. Polling place statistics are shown to the right for the Downer polling place at the 2025 federal and 2024 ACT elections. Downer is frequently the strongest suburb in the territory for the ACT Greens.
