= Fisher, Australian Capital Territory =

Fisher
- Suburb
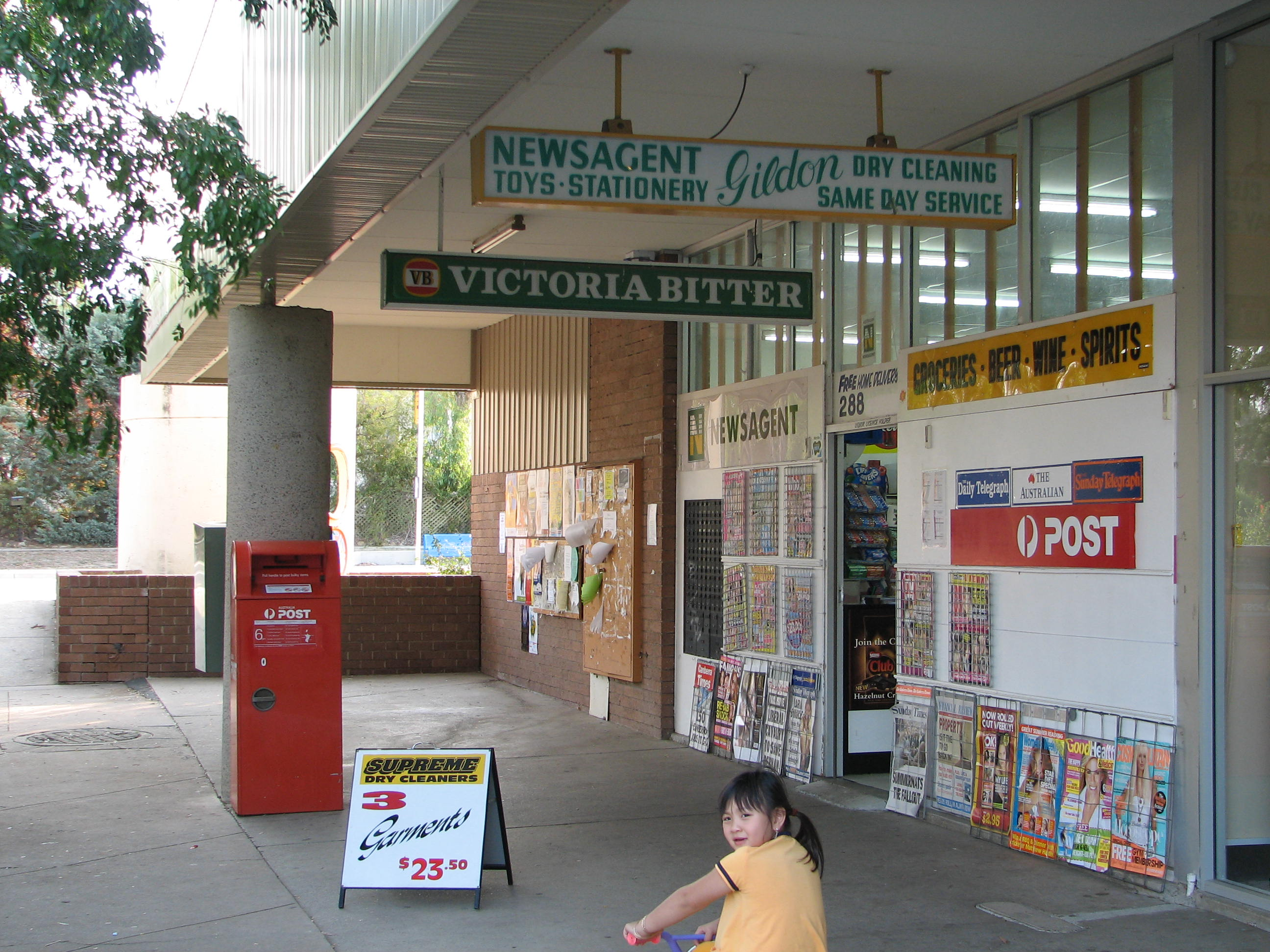
- Fisher shopping centre c. 2007

- Coordinates: 35°21′40″S 149°03′25″E
- Country: Australia
- State: Australian Capital Territory
- City: Canberra
- District: Weston Creek
- Location: 15 km (9.3 mi) SW of Canberra CBD; 19 km (12 mi) W of Queanbeyan; 105 km (65 mi) SW of Goulburn; 302 km (188 mi) SW of Sydney
- Established: 1970

Government
  - Territory electorate: Murrumbidgee
  - Federal division: Bean

Area
  - Total: 1.6 km^{2} (0.62 sq mi)
- Elevation: 630 m (2,070 ft)

Population
  - Total: 3,219 (SAL 2021)
- Postcode: 2611
Suburbs around Fisher
Stirling	Waramanga	Chifley
Chapman	Fisher
	Canberra Nature Park

Fisher is a suburb of Canberra, Australian Capital Territory, Australia located in the district of Weston Creek. Fisher was named after Andrew Fisher (1862–1928), coal miner, founding member of the federal parliamentary Labor Party and Prime Minister of Australia for three terms between 1908 and 1915 (ACTLIC, 2004). The theme for the street names in Fisher is Australian mines and mining towns (ACTPLA, 2003).

== Geology ==
Laidlaw Volcanics pale to dark grey dacitic tuff is found though most of Fisher except north slice of the suburb which is Deakin Volcanics red-purple and green grey rhyodacite with spherulitic texture.
