= Canberra Nature Park =

Series of protected areas in Australia

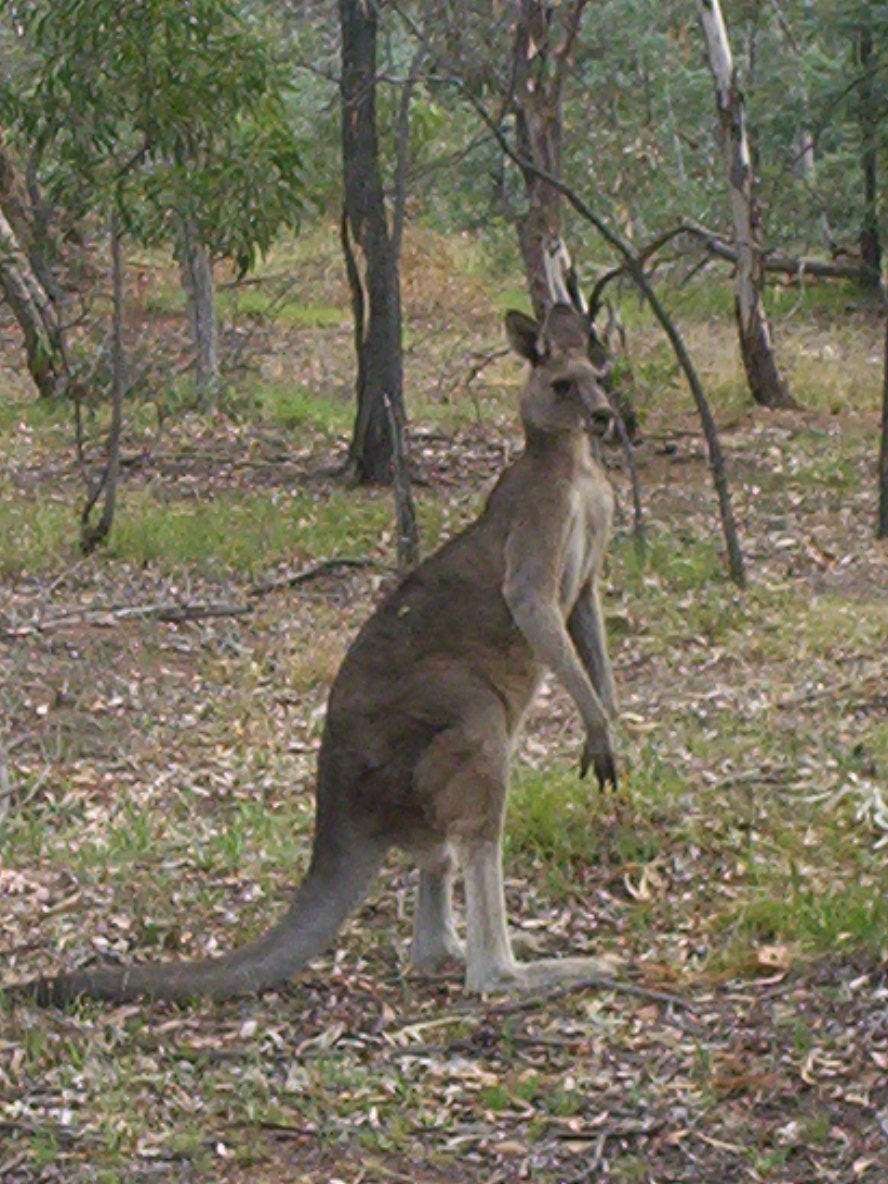
One of many grey kangaroos in Canberra's Nature Parks, this one near Mount Majura

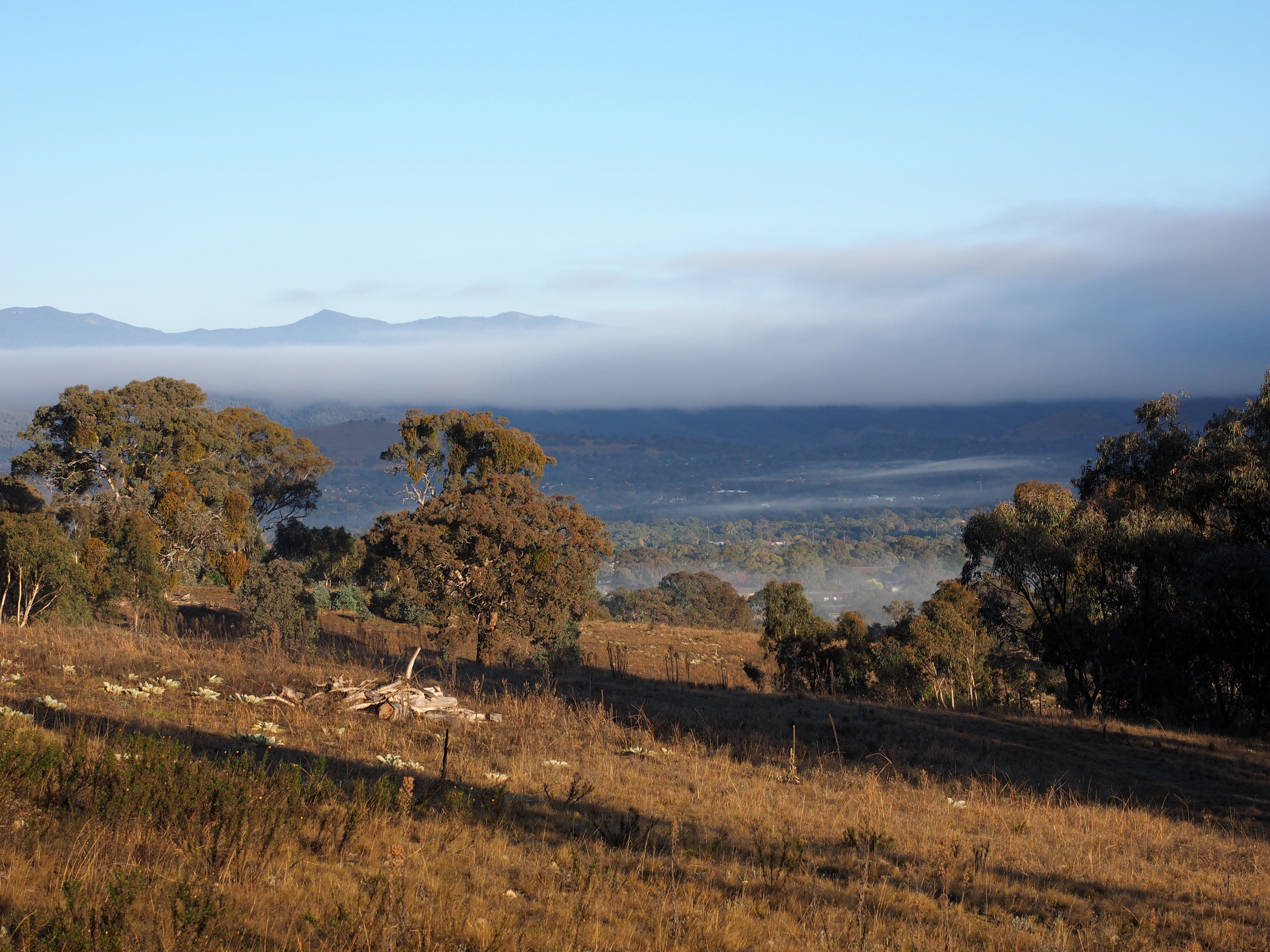
View of the Tuggeranong Valley and Brindabella Mountains from Wanniassa Hills Nature Reserve

The Canberra Nature Park is a series of 39 protected areas in and around Canberra, Australian Capital Territory, ranging from bushland hills to lowland native grassland. Many of the areas have previously been cleared for grazing, but many are now being returned to native bushland through revegetation and rehabilitation programs.

Canberra's inner hills Black Mountain, Mount Ainslie, Mount Majura, Mount Pleasant, Russell Hill, Red Hill, Mount Mugga, O'Connor Ridge, Bruce Ridge, Aranda Bushland, Mount Painter, The Pinnacle, Lyneham Ridge, Oakey Hill, Mount Taylor, Isaacs Ridge, Mount Stromlo, Mount Arawang, Neighbour Hill, Wanniassa Hill, and Narrabundah Hill are protected from development by the National Capital Plan and almost all are now part of the Canberra Nature Park system. These hills provide a scenic backdrop and natural setting for Canberra's urban areas, as originally set out in the Walter Burley Griffin Plan.

Most people in Canberra live within easy walking distance of a Canberra Nature Park area.

The areas are typically enclosed by simple wire fences, or by house fences. Gates are provided for people to walk or run in the parks; motorbikes are excluded. Some parks with mountains have reservoirs, as part of Icon Water's supply network.

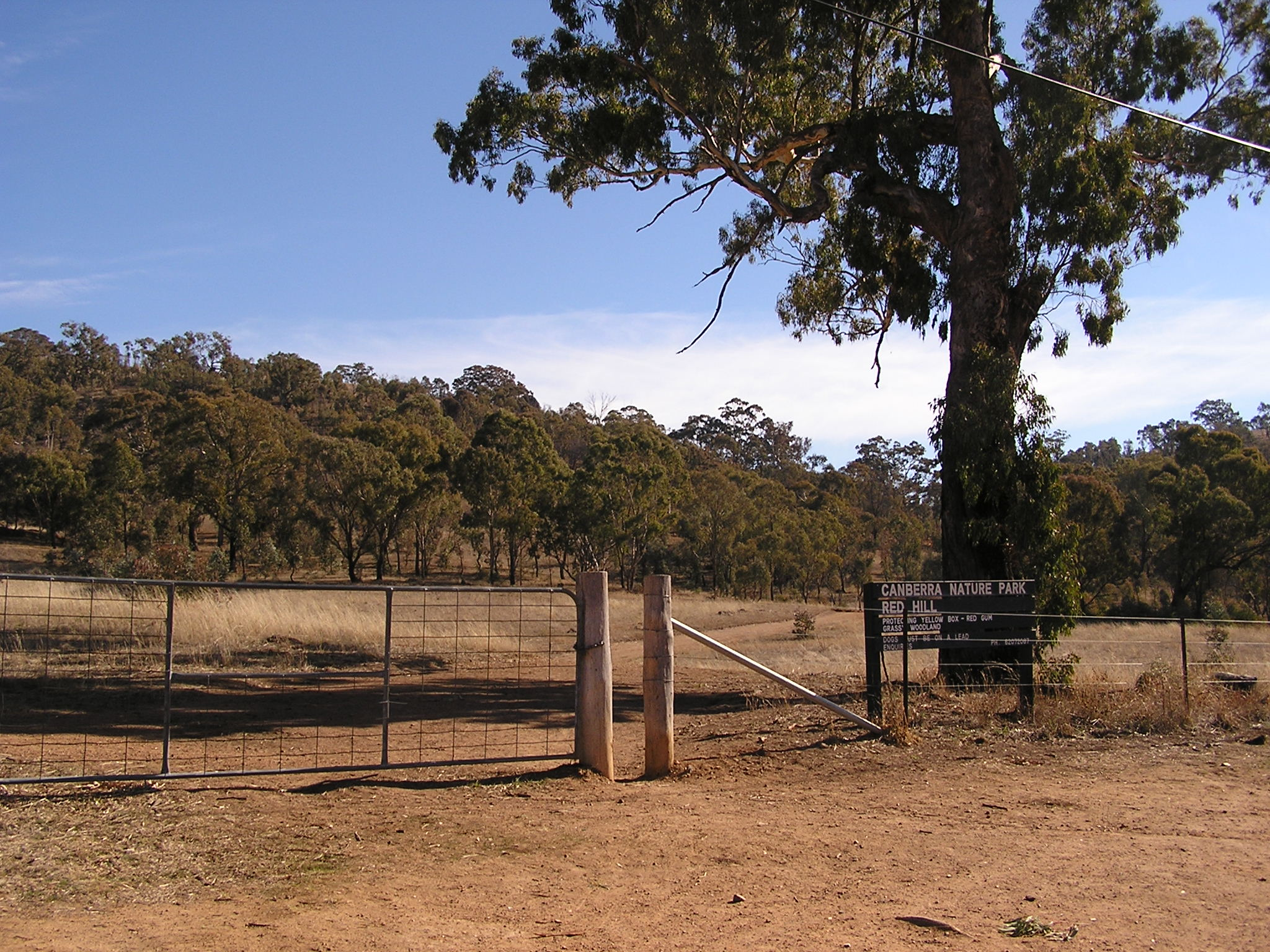
Nature park entrance to Red Hill reserve showing typical fencing

Park	Vegetation	Area (km²)
Aranda Bushland Nature Reserve	Forest	1.06
Black Mountain Nature Reserve	Forest	4.52
Bruce Ridge Nature Reserve	Forest	1.34
Budjan Galindji Grasslands Nature Reserve	Grassland	0.2
Callum Brae Nature Reserve	Woodland	1.43
Cooleman Ridge Nature Reserve	Woodland	1.89
Crace Grassland Nature Reserve	Grassland	1.21
Dunlop Grassland Nature Reserve	Grassland Nature Reserve	1.06
Farrer Ridge Nature Reserve	Woodland	1.78
Goorooyarroo Nature Reserve	Woodland	7.01
Gossan Hill Nature Reserve	Forest	0.48
Gungaderra Grassland Nature Reserve	Grassland	2.70
Isaacs Ridge Nature Reserve	Forest/Woodland	0.34
Jarramlee-West MacGregor Grasslands Nature Reserve	Grassland	1.45
Justice Robert Hope Park	Woodland	0.19
Jerrabomberra Wetlands Nature Reserve	Wetland	2.08
Kinlyside Nature Reserve	Grassy Woodland	2.28
Kowen Escarpment Nature Reserve	Forest	4.66
McQuoids Hill Nature Reserve	Woodland	0.56
Melrose Nature Reserve	Woodland	1.93
Molonglo Gorge Nature Reserve	Forest/woodland	5.06
Mount Ainslie Nature Reserve	Forest/woodland	6.37
Mount Majura Nature Reserve	Woodland	5.02
Mount Mugga Mugga Nature Reserve	Woodland	1.05
Mount Painter Reserve Nature Reserve	Woodland	0.86
Mount Pleasant Nature Reserve	Woodland	0.50
Mount Taylor Nature Reserve	Woodland	2.93
Mulanggari Grassland Nature Reserve	Grassland	1.17
Mulligans Flat Woodland Sanctuary	Woodland	12.53
Nadjung Mada Nature Reserve	Grassland/Woodland	1.6
O'Connor Ridge Nature Reserve	Forest	0.62
Oakey Hill Nature Reserve	Woodland	0.66
Percival Hill Nature Reserve	Forest	0.63
Red Hill Nature Reserve	Woodland	2.87
Rob Roy Nature Reserve	Forest	19.77
The Pinnacle Nature Reserve	Woodland	1.38
Tuggeranong Hill Nature Reserve	Woodland	3.17
Urambi Hills Nature Reserve	Woodland	2.43
Wanniassa Hills Nature Reserve	Woodland	2.27

== See also ==
- List of Australian Capital Territory protected areas
