= George Allen (sculptor) =

Australian sculptor and war artist

- Born: 8 February 1900; Bendigo, Australia
- Died: 12 October 1972 (aged 72)
- Education: Bendigo Junior Technical School; Caulfield Technical School; Swineburne Technical College
- Known for: Sculpture

George Henry Allen (8 February 1900 – 12 October 1972) was an Australian sculptor and teacher, an official war artist in the latter years of the Second World War.

== History ==
Allen was born in Kangaroo Flat, Bendigo, a son of George Edward Romeo Allen and his wife Emma Maria "Annie" Allen, née Schutt.

He was educated at Bendigo Junior Technical School and in 1917, won a scholarship for training as an industrial art teacher, and studied at Caulfield Technical School, and Swinburne Technical College.

In 1933 he succeeded John S. Davie (Note: Davie, a Scotsman, is best known for his statue of Robert Burns in Canberra. He was the subject of an Archibald Prize painting by Amalie Colquhoun.) (1862–1955) as head of the Modelling and Sculpture Department at the Working Men's College, Melbourne, which in 1934 became the Melbourne Technical College, which became RMIT, from which he retired in 1965.

He served as an official war artist with the rank of lieutenant from December 1943, working at Port Moresby and the Australian War Memorial, retired February 1945.

== Works ==
- War memorial near Shrine of Remembrance (1949)
- In 1952 he won a design contest worth £3,000, a bequest from Ballarat solicitor Willian Pinkerton. The statue, unveiled in 1952, aroused some controversy.
- War memorial, Kew Town Hall (1952)
- Australian War Memorial (1954)
- Bronze relief portraits mounted on stone wall, installed in namesake Canberra suburbs:
  - Chifley Memorial (Joseph Benedict Chifley), Chifley shopping centre, commissioned by the National Capital Development Commission (NCDC) 1968, installed 1969
  - Curtin Memorial (John Joseph Curtin), Curtin shopping centre, shopping centre, commissioned by NCDC 1968, installed 1969
  - Hughes Memorial (William Morris Hughes), Hughes shopping centre, commissioned by NCDC 1964, installed 1964
  - Lyons Memorial (Joseph Aloysius Lyons), Lyons shopping centre, commissioned by NCDC 1968, installed 1969

== Recognition ==
- In 1954 he was awarded the Queen's Coronation Medal.

== Family ==
Allen married Ethel Maud Turner. They had a home at 10 Ruabon Road, Toorak, Victoria.
