= Phillip, Australian Capital Territory =

Phillip
- Suburb
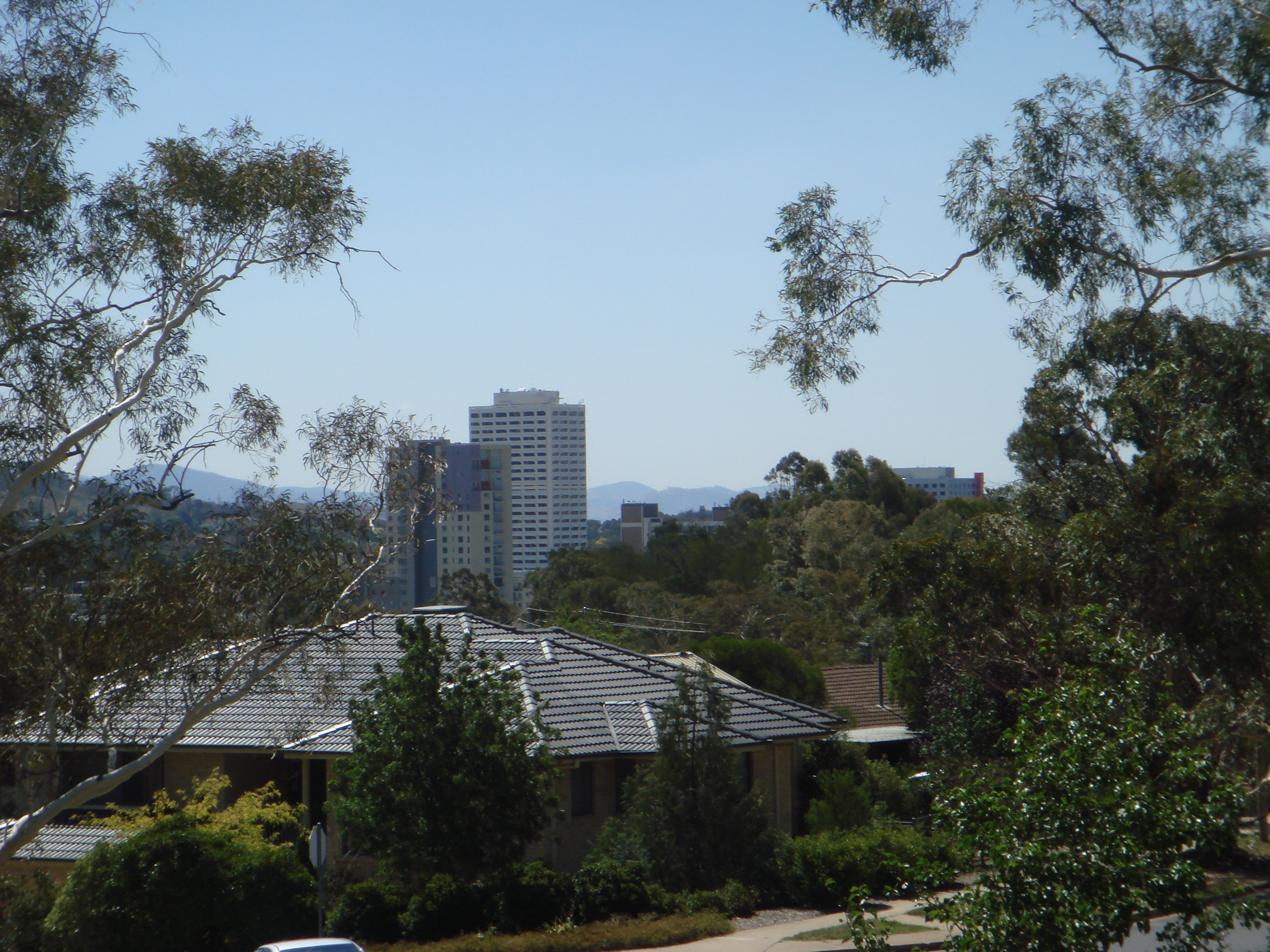
- Looking towards the centre of Phillip from Swinger Hill

- Coordinates: 35°20′58″S 149°05′25″E
- Country: Australia
- State: Australian Capital Territory
- City: Canberra
- District: Woden Valley
- Location: 11 km (6.8 mi) SSW of Canberra CBD; 15 km (9.3 mi) W of Queanbeyan; 102 km (63 mi) SW of Goulburn; 299 km (186 mi) SW of Sydney
- Established: 1966

Government
  - Territory electorate: Murrumbidgee
  - Federal division: Bean

Area
  - Total: 2.6 km^{2} (1.0 sq mi)
- Elevation: 596 m (1,955 ft)

Population
  - Total: 5,197 (2021 census)
  - Density: 2,000/km^{2} (5,180/sq mi)
- Postcode: 2606
Suburbs around Phillip
Lyons	Curtin	Hughes
Chifley	Phillip	Garran
Pearce	Mawson	O'Malley

Phillip is a suburb of Canberra, Australia in the district of Woden Valley. It is located in the centre of the district and contains the district's main commercial centre, Woden Town Centre. Phillip had a residential population of 5,197 at the 2021 census; 67.0% of the population lived in flats. Many more flats are being planned or built.

The suburb is named after Arthur Phillip, the first Governor of New South Wales. The suburb name was gazetted on 12 May 1966. Streets in Phillip use names associated with the First, Second and Third Fleets; streets in the Swinger Hill were named after architects.

As the commercial and geographical centre of Woden, Phillip contains many of the district's key facilities. As well as the Woden Town Centre, which includes the Westfield Woden shopping centre, a bus interchange and the Lovett Tower (the tallest commercial office building in Canberra), it has its own commercial area located along Botany, Townshend and Parramatta Streets. Eddison Park, including Woden Skate Park and Disc Golf Course, and the Woden Cemetery are located in the suburb.

== Swinger Hill ==
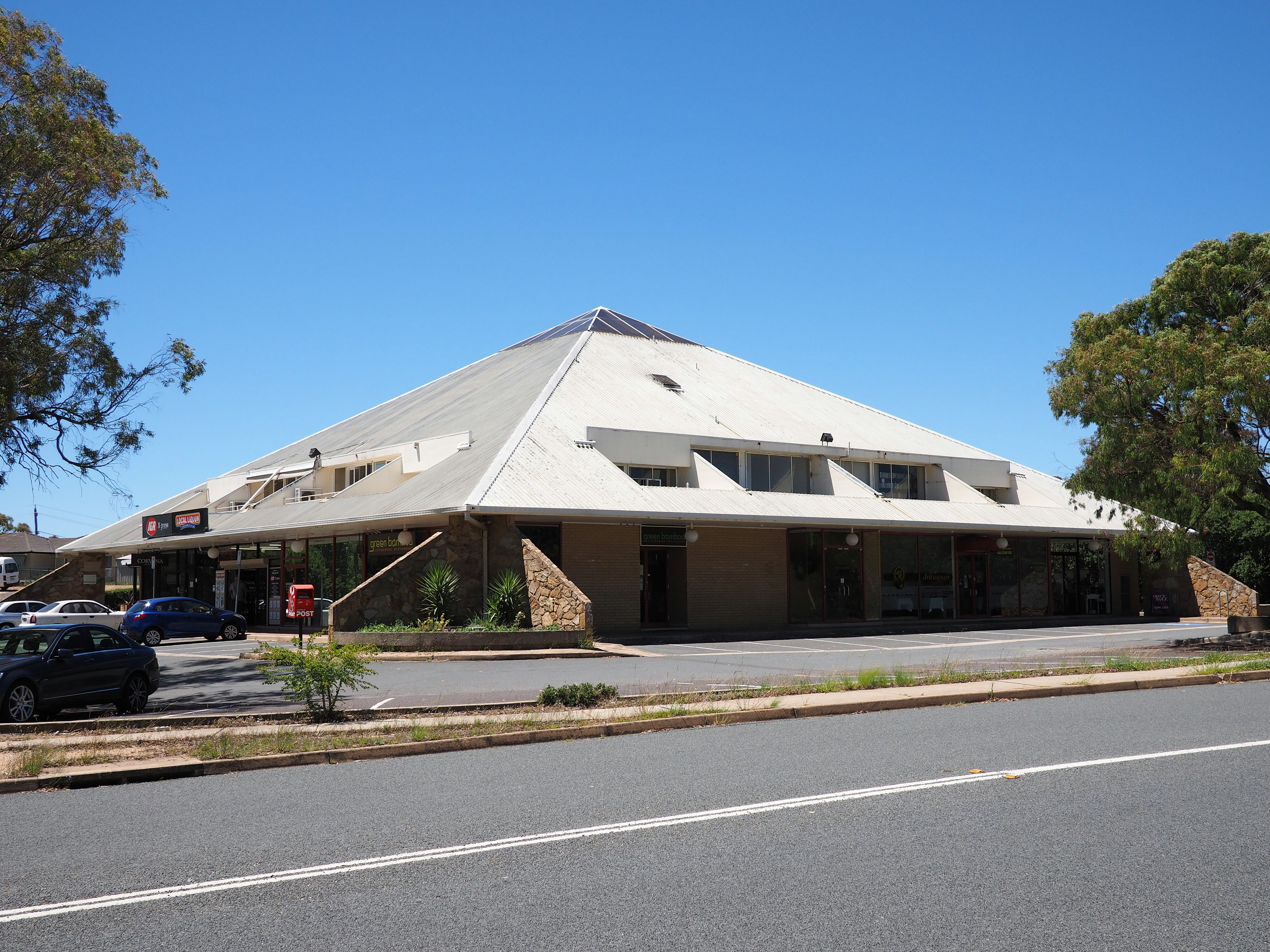
Swinger Hill shops

The Swinger Hill housing estate is located in Phillip but separated by Hindmarsh and Athllon Drives from the main part of Phillip. The name Swinger Hill follows the pattern of calling local trigonometrical points after the surveyor who surveyed them, in this case Louis Walter Henry Swinger (1901–1943). He was a member of the Institution of Surveyors (NSW) and worked in Canberra as a surveyor with the Department of the Interior.

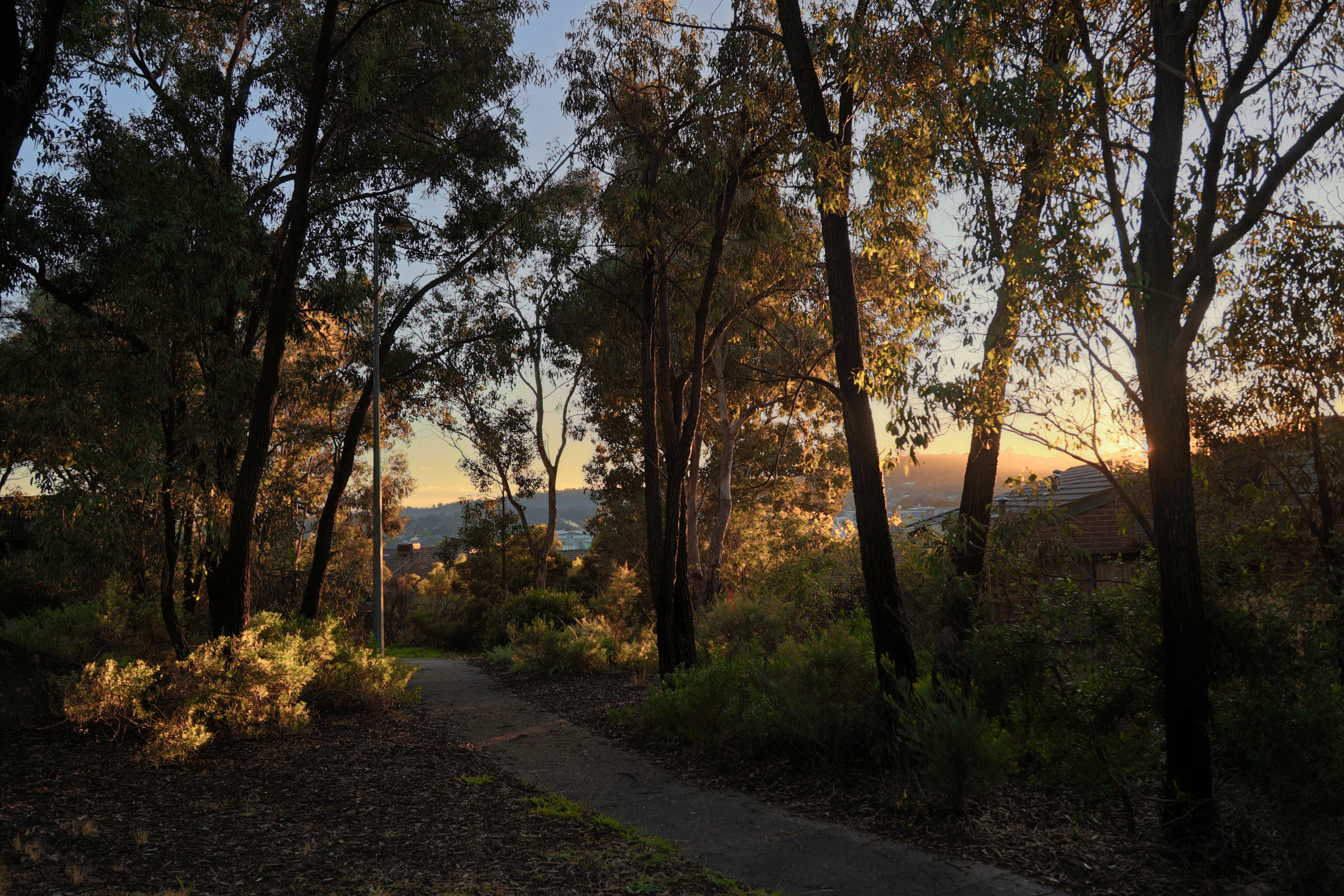
Swinger Hill Triangulation Station as photographed at dawn

The Swinger Hill development was built in the 1970s, some years after Phillip itself, as an estate of mixed townhouses. Some of the houses in Barnet Close in Swinger Hill are listed by the Royal Australian Institute of Architects as significant twentieth century architecture, and were given heritage listing in the ACT in late 2011.

== Demographics ==
At the 2021 census, there were 5,197 people in Phillip an increase from 1,689 at the 2001 census. 52.2% of people were born in Australia. The next most common countries of birth were India (8.0%), Nepal (6.3%) and the Philippines (5.1%). 55.4% of people spoke only English at home. Other languages spoken at home included Nepali (5.9%), Malayalam (4.8)%, Tagalog and Filipino (4.4%) and Mandarin (3.5%). The most common responses for religion were No Religion (39.5%), Catholic (18.7%) and Hinduism (10.4%). 67.0% of its occupied dwellings were flats and all but three of the rest (32.8%) were semi-detached, terraces or townhouses.

== Sport ==
Phillip contains a number of sporting facilities, including the Phillip Enclosed Oval, which has been known as Football Park since 1981 and was the headquarters of Australian rules football in Canberra during the 1980s and 1990s, and the Phillip Swimming & Ice Skating Centre, home to the CBR Brave of the Australian Ice Hockey League.

== Education ==
The Canberra College is situated in Phillip.

== Geology ==
The rocks underneath Phillip are from the Silurian period and are from 417 to 414 million years old.

Deakin Volcanics green-grey and purple coloured rhyodacite is found in the west half and south east corner of Phillip and under the cemetery area, and Deakin Volcanics purple and green tuff is found around Hindmarsh Drive on the east side of Phillip. The volcano that produced these rocks may have been in Lyons. A small strip of shale from the older and lower Yarralumla Formation is just to the west of Easty Street.
