= Anne Ross (Australian sculptor) =

Australian sculptor (born 1959)

Anne Ross (born 1959) is an Australian sculptor, whose large fanciful bronze statues figure prominently in various public places. Based in Bayside, Melbourne, she is recognised for her whimsical and humorous artworks, created over four decades, that blend elements of the human and non-human.

== Career ==
In childhood Ross suffered osteomyelitis entailing immobilisation of her leg and hospitalisation and, with working parents, spent much time alone, in which she drew intensively. At age twenty and during 1979–82 she undertook a Diploma of Art & Design in Fine Art (Drawing), at Prahran College of Advanced Education. Until 1988 she freelanced as an illustrator of children’s books for publishers Oxford University Press, Longman and Cheshire and Thomas Nelson Australia, experience which inspired and coloured her sculptural imagery. Alongside that work Ross also pursued her artistic interests, renting space at Caravan, a group studio in Richmond, where she met sculptors. Determining to take up the medium, at twenty-five she enrolled as a mature-age student at the same Prahran College, then part of Victoria College, and studied for a BFA in sculpture 1988-91.

Ross was employed as a foundry technician while at Prahran College, work which continued after her graduation and the merger of the College into the Victorian College of the Arts in 1993. She moved her studio to Gasworks Art Park in Albert Park where she started to receive commissions in 1991, one of which, Not Without Chomley remains in its grounds. Ross's training in foundry techniques enables her to produce work more quickly than can those sculptors who rely on others for the industrial processes required in production of large-scale sculpture.

Ross received a grant from the Australia Council in 1992 and samples of her work were included in the Moet & Chandon touring exhibition in 1994. She received ongoing support through exhibitions organised by gallerist Brenda May's directorships of Access Contemporary Art Gallery and May's eponymous gallery 1994–2008.

Ross was employed from 1994 at Perrin Sculpture Foundry in Cheltenham and subsequently relocated her own studio to the suburb. During this period her interest in anthropomorphism and a childlike conversation of animals with humans became more confident, as is evident in developments between Degas Dogs (1997) and Point of Origin (2000). Dogs, their toys, and children's playthings provide much of the subject matter.

In 2023 Bayside Gallery mounted a survey of Ross's work, curated by Joanna Bosse and with catalogue essays by the curator and Andrew Stephens that highlight Ross's preoccupation with 'pathos and humour within the themes of companionship, belonging and self-containment through the medium of bronze.'

== Works ==
Ross's public works are distributed nationally and internationally, and include Midnight (2015), at the University of Wollongong, Summertime (2017) in the City of Bayside, Taken Not Given (2018) in Melbourne, and the multi-piece Lost and Found (2019) along the Pier Promenade of Frankston City. Ross contributed a much smaller bronze bunyip to the American Natural History Museum, New York City. The artwork Boing II (1995), has been acquired by Artbank as part of the Australian Government Office for the Arts contemporary Australian art collection. In 2016, the "playful" sculpture M is for Market, was commissioned by the Dandenong Market, Creative Victoria and the City of Greater Dandenong to commemorate the Market's 150th birthday.

== Reception ==
Ross's $80,000 The Resting Place (1999) for the City of Kingston which, as reported in The Australian Jewish News, was her then largest work and based on her research into the indigenous name for the district mooorooboon, a factor acknowledged by the mayor as a reason 'the artist was chosen for her skill and the enormous enthusiasm she brought to the project. She references aspects of local contemporary and historical cultural life within the piece in subtle and humorous ways.'

Known for the anthropomorphic characterisations of her subjects, Ross's submission in the McClelland Contemporary Sculpture Survey of 2006 attracted critic Ashley Crawford's comment that it 'looks cute from afar, but upon approach the mongrels turn on the viewer with deep growls; one almost expects them to start frothing at the mouth.'

Dance of the Platypus (2001) in the City of Wyndham, On the Road Again (2011) in Lyons, ACT, followed, and The Other Side of Midnight (2012) in Canberra, was funded by the Australian Capital Territory government's Percent for Art scheme, which commenced in 1978 to commit 1 percent of new capital works annually to public art projects. The program was subject to controversy during the 2008 election and discontinued in 2009, so The Other Side of Midnight with three other sculptors' works were kept in storage until, as announced in The Age and in other media Arts Minister Joy Burch 'unveiled the whimsical $187,000 work 'The Other Side of Midnight' by Melbourne artist Anne Ross in City Walk on December 4.'

Ross was also commissioned to create A is for Alexander B is for Bunyip C is for Canberra (2011), a reference to the 1972 children's book The Monster that Ate Canberra by Michael Salmon, the inspiration for the ABC-TV children's series Alexander Bunyip's Billabong. The statue was installed adjacent the public library, Gungahlin, Australian Capital Territory and launched by Jon Stanhope MLA on 13 April 2011. Within three years maintenance costing over $5,000 was committed.

In 2023, the three-part sculpture She gave me a daisy was featured at Billilla Mansion Gardens as an extension of her major solo retrospective at Brighton's Bayside Gallery. In the catalogue of that show, curator Joanna Bosse remarks on Ross's working of patinated cast bronze for her sculptures, emphasising that it is a 'challenging and technically demanding medium' and that in their production she works 'hands-on at every stage' to make complex works:

Ross's extraordinary ability to translate poetic, dreamlike ideas and imagery into this ancient, weighty medium with a deft lightness of touch sets her apart as a true innovator. This seeming incongruity is just one of many that lies at the heart of her intriguing works.

She gave me a daisy appeared later in the Mars Gallery 2023 Christmas Exhibition catalogue.

== Exhibitions ==
=== Solo ===
- 2023, 8 July–27 August: Whichaway, Bayside Gallery, cnr. Wilson and Carpenter Sts. Brighton
- 2008, 12 Aug–6 Sept: Brenda May Gallery, 2 Danks St., Waterloo, Sydney
- 2006 Brian Moore Gallery, 294 Glenmore Rd., Paddington, New South Wales
- 2004 Brian Moore Gallery, 294 Glenmore Rd., Paddington, New South Wales
- 2002 Brian Moore Gallery, 294 Glenmore Rd., Paddington, New South Wales
- 2001 Beaver Galleries, Anne Ross: Sculpture, 81 Denison St, Deakin, ACT
- 2001 Beaver Galleries, Cha, Cha, Cha, 81 Denison St, Deakin, ACT
- 1999 Access Contemporary Art Gallery, Redfern, Sydney
- 1997 Access Contemporary Art Gallery, Redfern, Sydney
- 1995 Access Contemporary Art Gallery, Redfern, Sydney
- 1994 Access Contemporary Art Gallery, Redfern, Sydney

=== Group ===
- 2014: 17 June–12 July: Collectors: An excerpt from the private collection of Jeff Hinch, Brenda May Gallery, 2 Danks St., Waterloo, Sydney
- 2012: 14 July–26 August: 2012 Paul Guest Drawing Prize, Bendigo Art Gallery, Bendigo, Victoria
- 2010 Bic Show, White Gallery, Milan, Italy
- 2010, Theresienstadt – Drawn from the Inside, Jewish Museum of Australia
- 2008 Who Let the Dogs Out. The dog in contemporary Australian art. Lake Macquarie City Art Gallery NSW, Hazelhurst Regional Gallery, NSW
- 2008 Monobrow Show, Hell Gallery, Richmond
- 2008 Melbourne Art Fair, Royal Exhibition Building, Melbourne
- 2007 McClelland Sculpture Survey and Award, McClelland Gallery and Sculpture Park, Langwarrin, Victoria
- 2007 New Under the Sun, Jewish Museum of Australia, and touring.
- 2007 Prometheus Visual Arts Award, Queensland
- 2006 Melbourne International Arts Festival, Unsettled Boundaries, The Idea of the Animal, RMIT Gallery, Storey Hall, Melbourne
- 2006 Melbourne Art Fair, Royal Exhibition Building, Melbourne
- 2005 McClelland Sculpture Survey and Award, McClelland Gallery and Sculpture Park, Langwarrin, Victoria
- 2005 Art and Humour, Brenda May Gallery, Sydney
- 2005 Prometheus Visual Arts Award, Queensland
- 2004 Inaugural Exhibition, Heiser Gallery, Brisbane, Queensland
- 2003 McClelland Sculpture Survey and Award, McClelland Gallery and Sculpture Park, Langwarrin, Victoria
- 2003 Markers of Place, Toowoomba Regional Art Gallery
- 2002, 2 November–8 December: The Year In Art, S. H. Ervin Gallery, Sydney
- 2002 The Animal State, Manning Regional Art Gallery, NSW
- 2002 The Woollahra Small Sculpture Prize, NSW
- 2002, 1 June–21 July: Salon des Refuses, S.H. Ervin Gallery, Sydney
- 2002 Melbourne Art Fair, Royal Exhibition Building, Melbourne
- 2001 Menagerie @ Treasury, Gold Museum, Melbourne
- 2001 Sculpture Now, Brian Moore Gallery, Sydney
- 2001 Peer Pressure, Access Contemporary Art Gallery, Sydney
- 2000 Toowoomba Biennial Art Award, Toowoomba Regional Art Gallery
- 2000 Melbourne Art Fair 2000, Royal Exhibition Building, Melbourne
- 2000 Conrad Jupiters 2000 Art Prize, Gold Coast City Art Gallery, Queensland
- 1999 The 30th Alice Prize, The Araluen Centre, Alice Springs
- 1999 We Are Australian, Victorian Arts Centre, Melbourne
- 1999 A4 Art, West Space Inc, Footscray
- 1999 Nillumbik Art Award, Eltham Community Centre, Victoria
- 1998 Sixth Australian Contemporary Art Fair, Royal Exhibition Building, Melb.
- 1998 Conrad Jupiters Art Prize, Gold Coast City Art Gallery, Queensland
- 1998 Salon des Refuses, S.H. Ervin Gallery, Sydney
- 1997 Salon des Refuses, S.H. Ervin Gallery, Sydney
- 1997 Conrad Jupiters Art Prize, Gold Coast City Art Gallery, Queensland
- 1997 Nillumbik Art Award, Eltham Community Centre, Victoria
- 1996 Group Show, curated by Anne Loxley, Hyatt Regency Hotel, Sydney
- 1996 Mixed Platter, Access Gallery, National Gallery of Victoria
- 1996 Fifth Australian Contemporary Art Fair, Royal Exhibition Building, Melb.
- 1995 3rd Annual Contemporary Art Auction, Art Gallery of New South Wales
- 1994 Moet & Chandon Touring Exhibition: Art Gallery of Western Australia, Art Gallery of New South Wales, National Gallery of Australia, Queensland Art Gallery, National Gallery of Victoria
- 1993 Gasworks Outdoor Sculpture Show, Southgate, Melbourne
- 1993 Small Works – Two, Roar 2 Studios, Fitzroy
- 1993 Figurative Sculptors, Victorian College of the Arts Gallery, Melbourne
- 1992 Second Victorian Contemporary Sculpture Show, Kyneton, Victoria
- 1992 Gasworks Outdoor Sculpture Show, Gasworks, Albert Park
- 1991 Gasworks Outdoor Sculpture Show, Gasworks, Albert Park

== Collections ==
- City of Melbourne
- University of Wollongong
- Artbank, Sydney
- Toowoomba Regional Art Gallery
- Maitland Regional Gallery
- Jewish Museum of Australia
- Arts ACT, Canberra
- Frankston City Council
- City of Kingston
- City of Port Phillip
- Wyndham City Council
- Westfield, Southland Shopping Centre, Victoria
- Swire Properties Limited, Hong Kong
- Private and corporate collections in Australia, Singapore, Hong Kong and U.S.A.

== Gallery ==
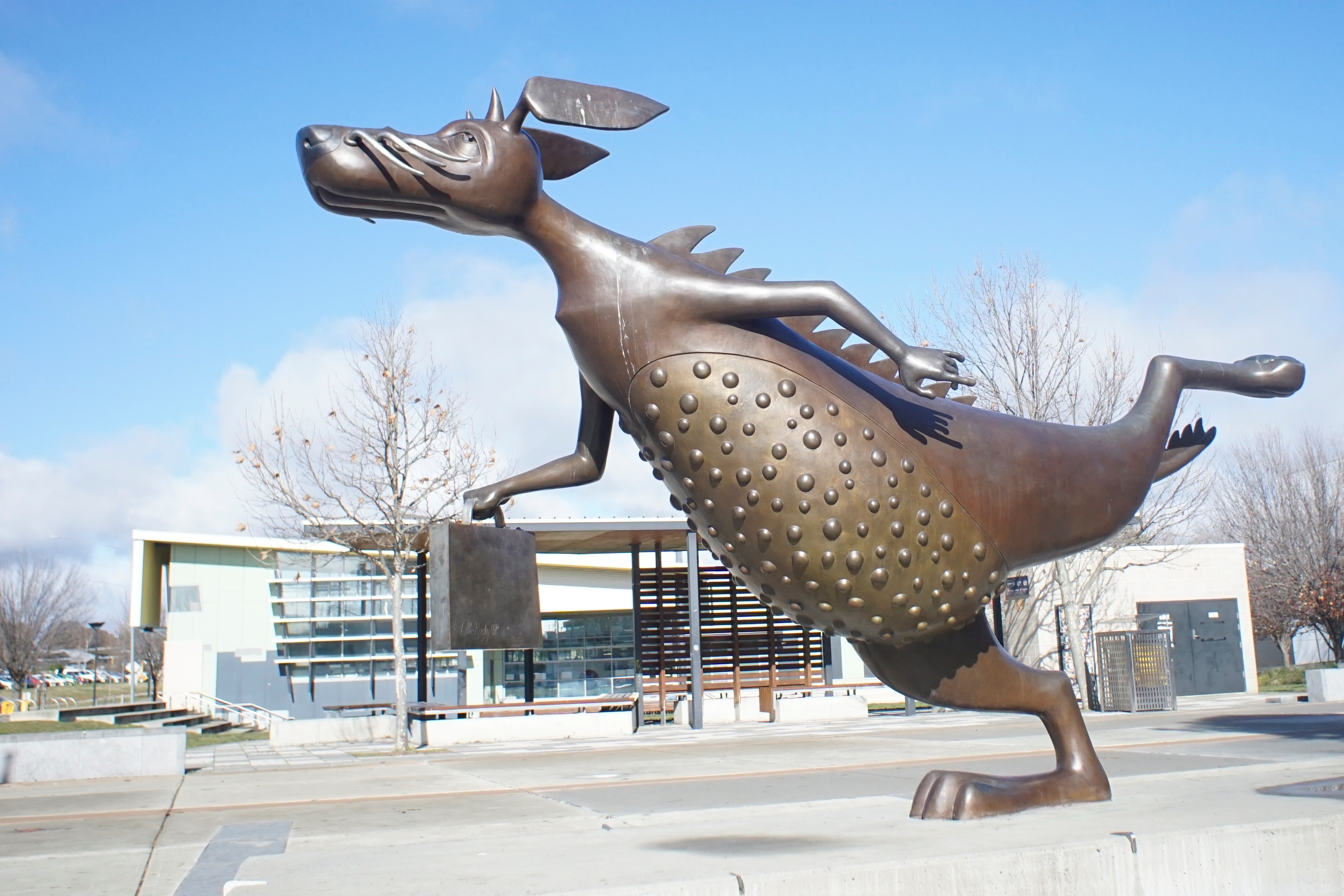
Alexander Bunyip, Gungahlin

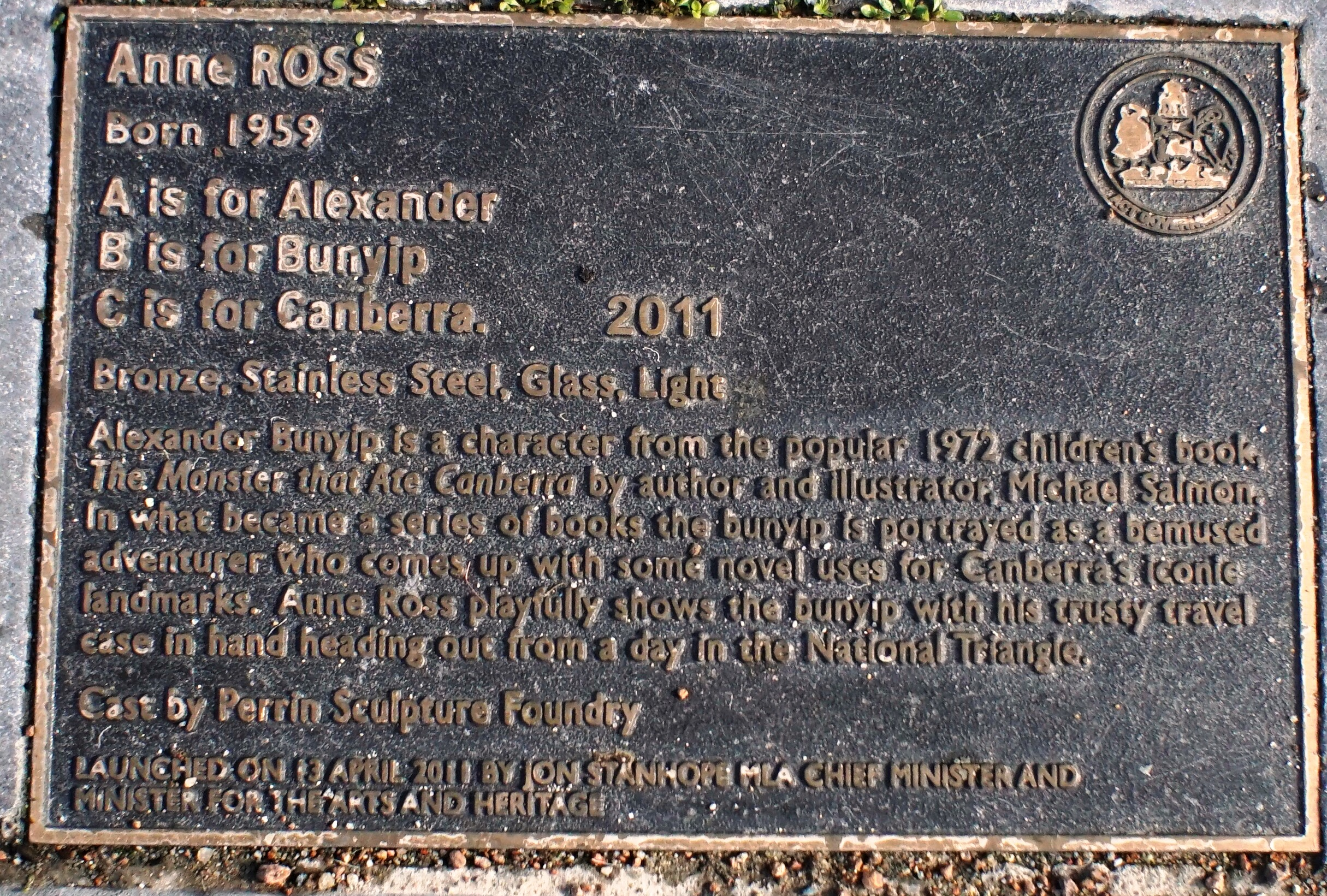
Plaque

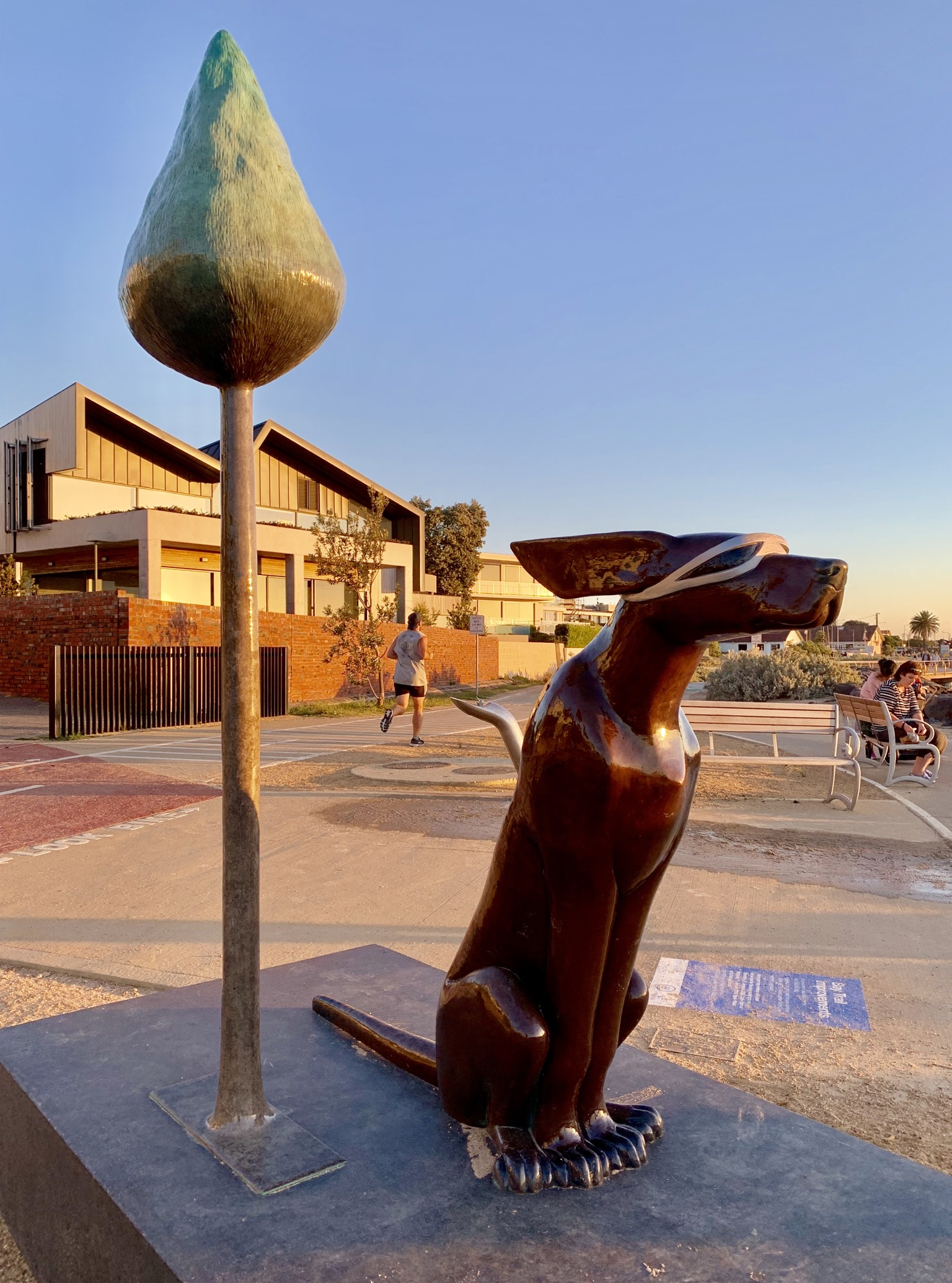
Summertime (2017)

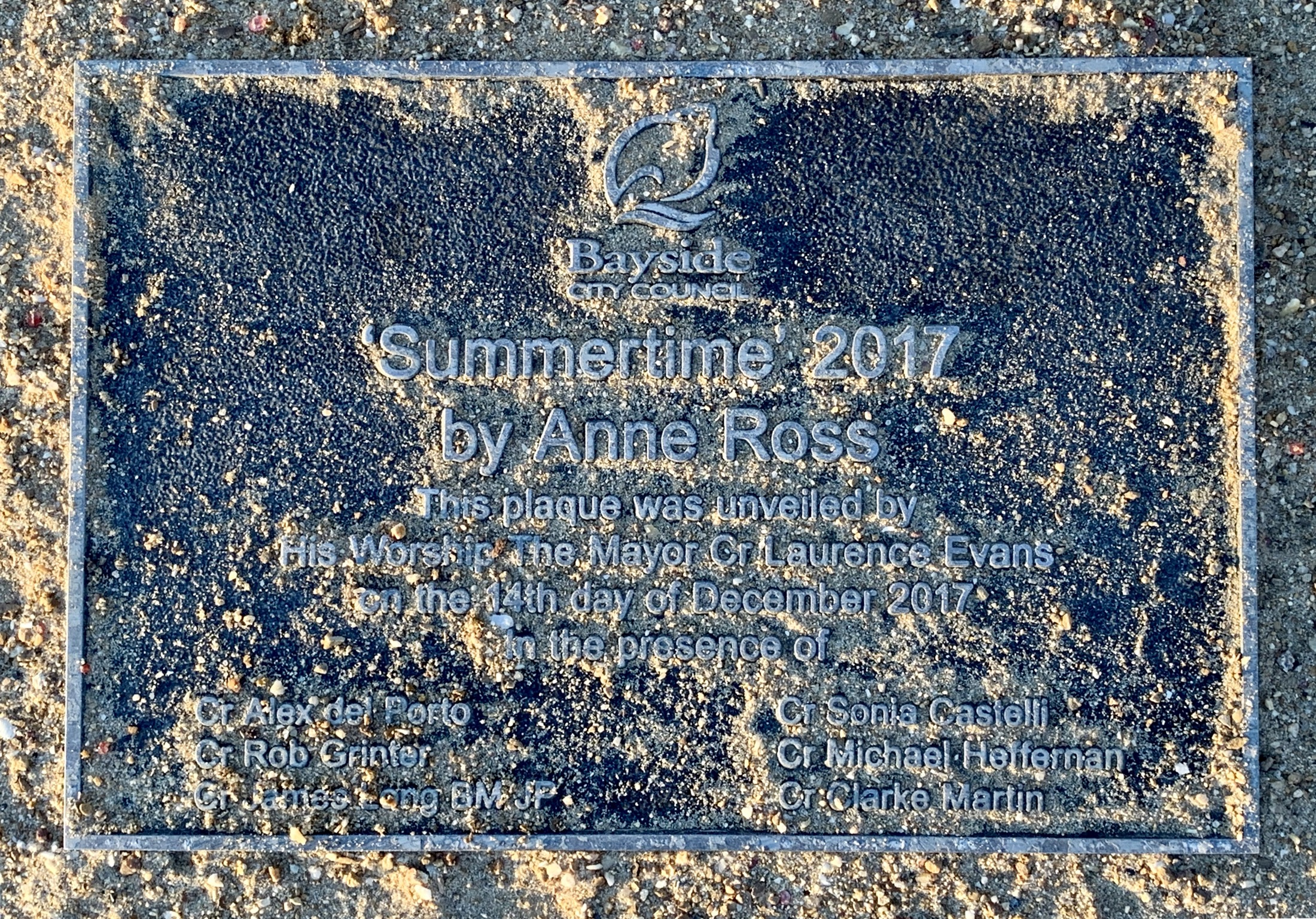
Plaque

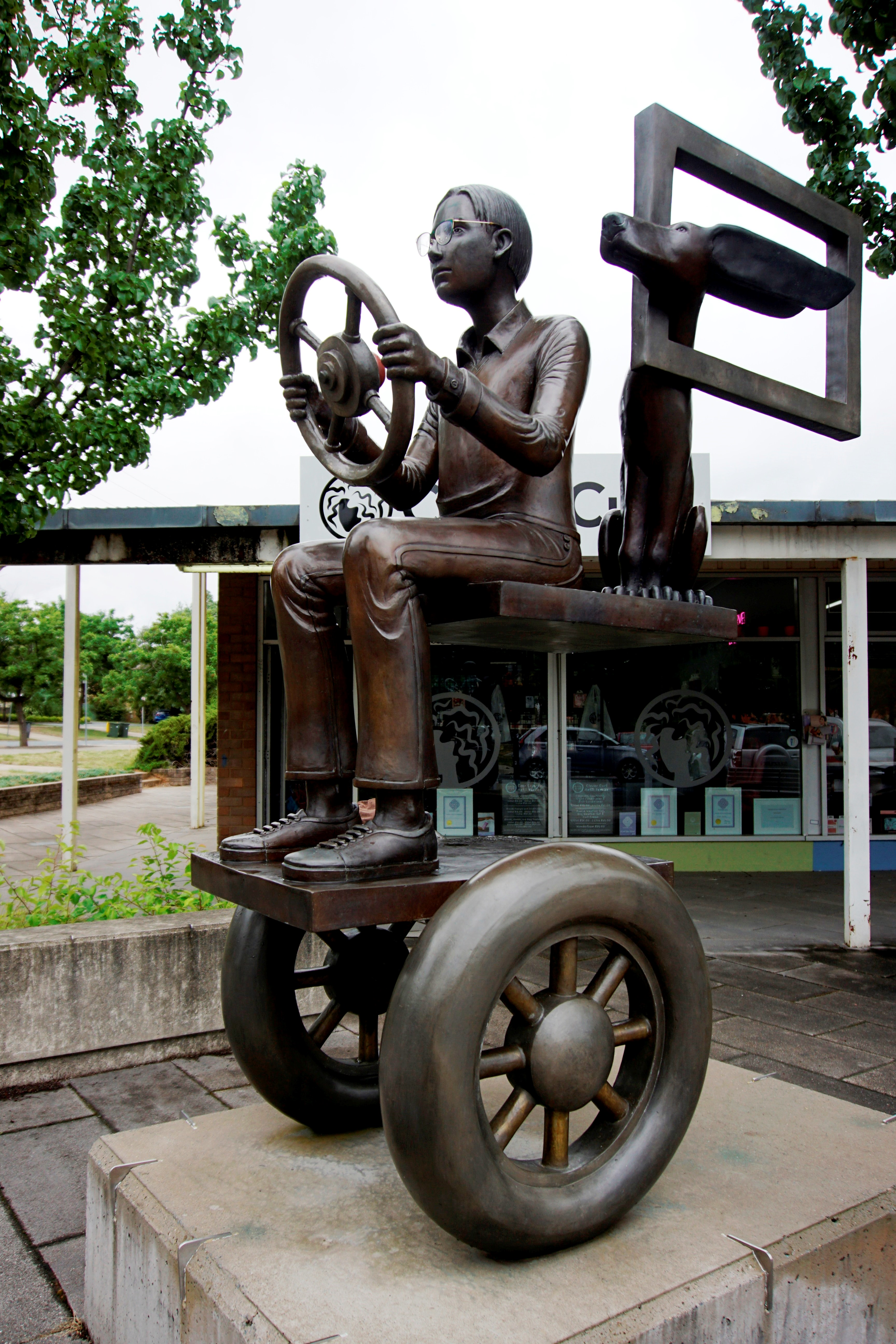
On the Road Again, Lyons ACT

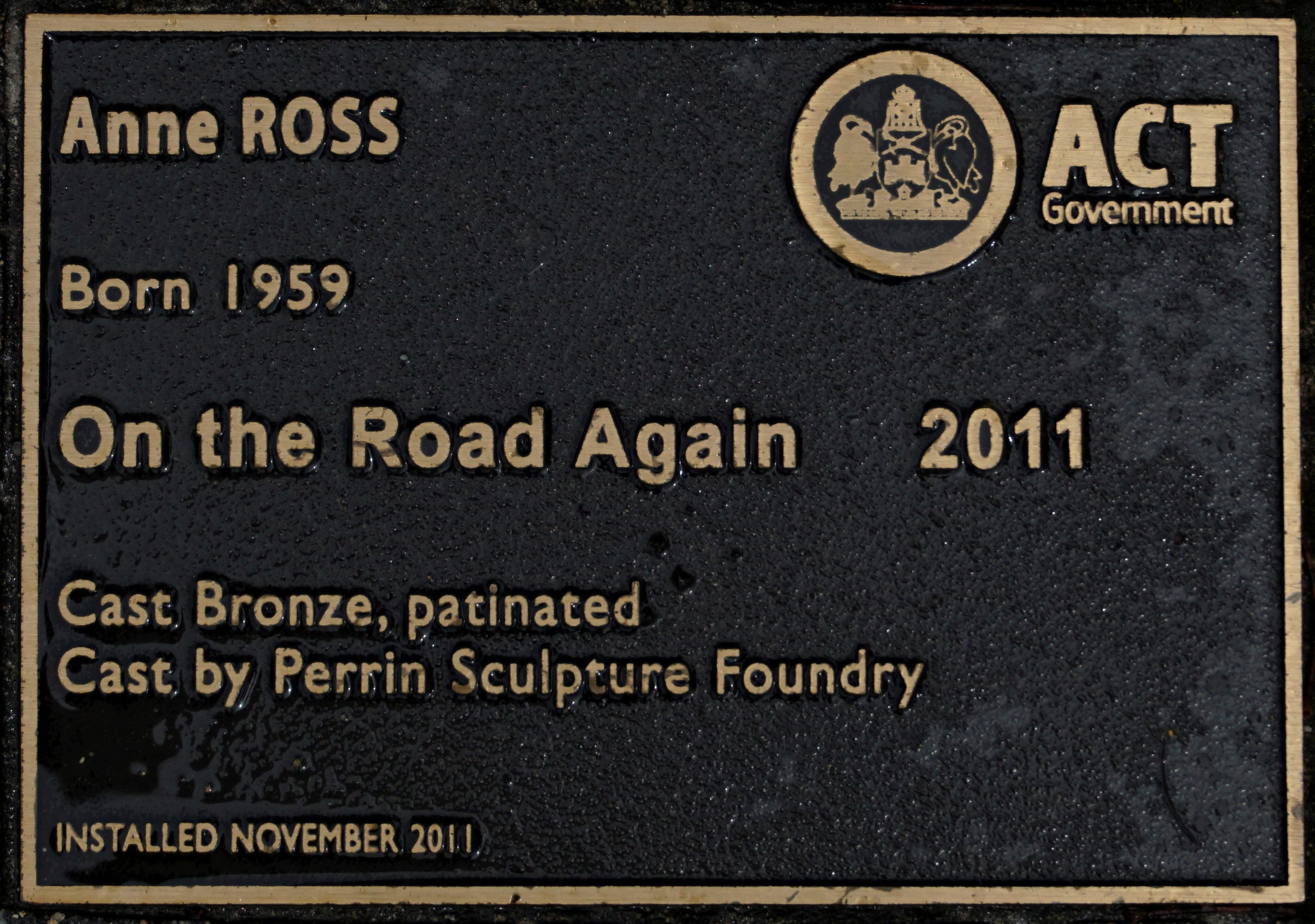
Plaque

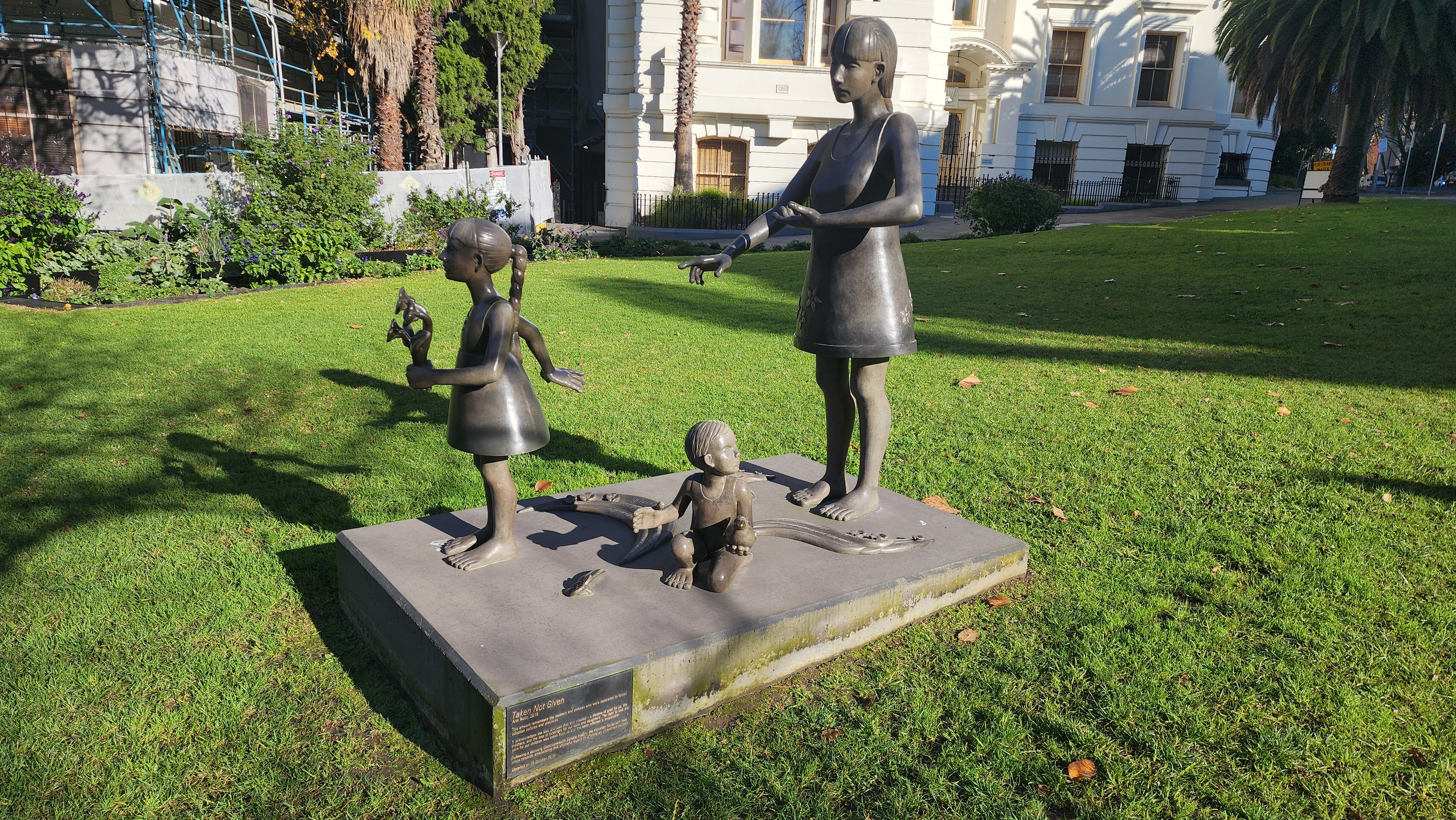
Taken Not Given - unveiled in 2018 by the then Victorian Minister for Families and Children, Jenny Mikakos, as a memorial to separation by forced adoption.

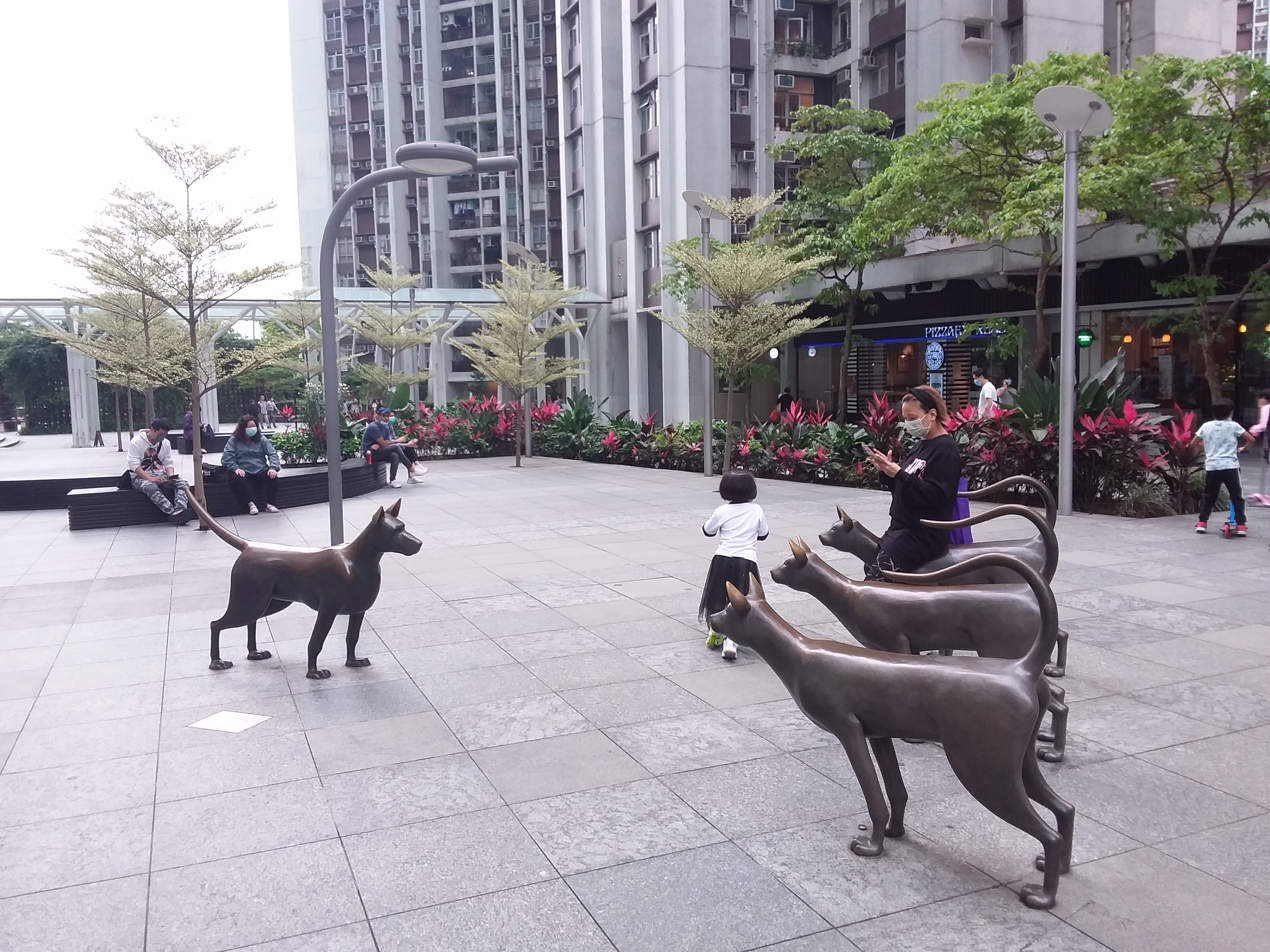
The Meeting (2008) artwork commissioned for Taikoo Place, Hong Kong.
