= Woden Valley =

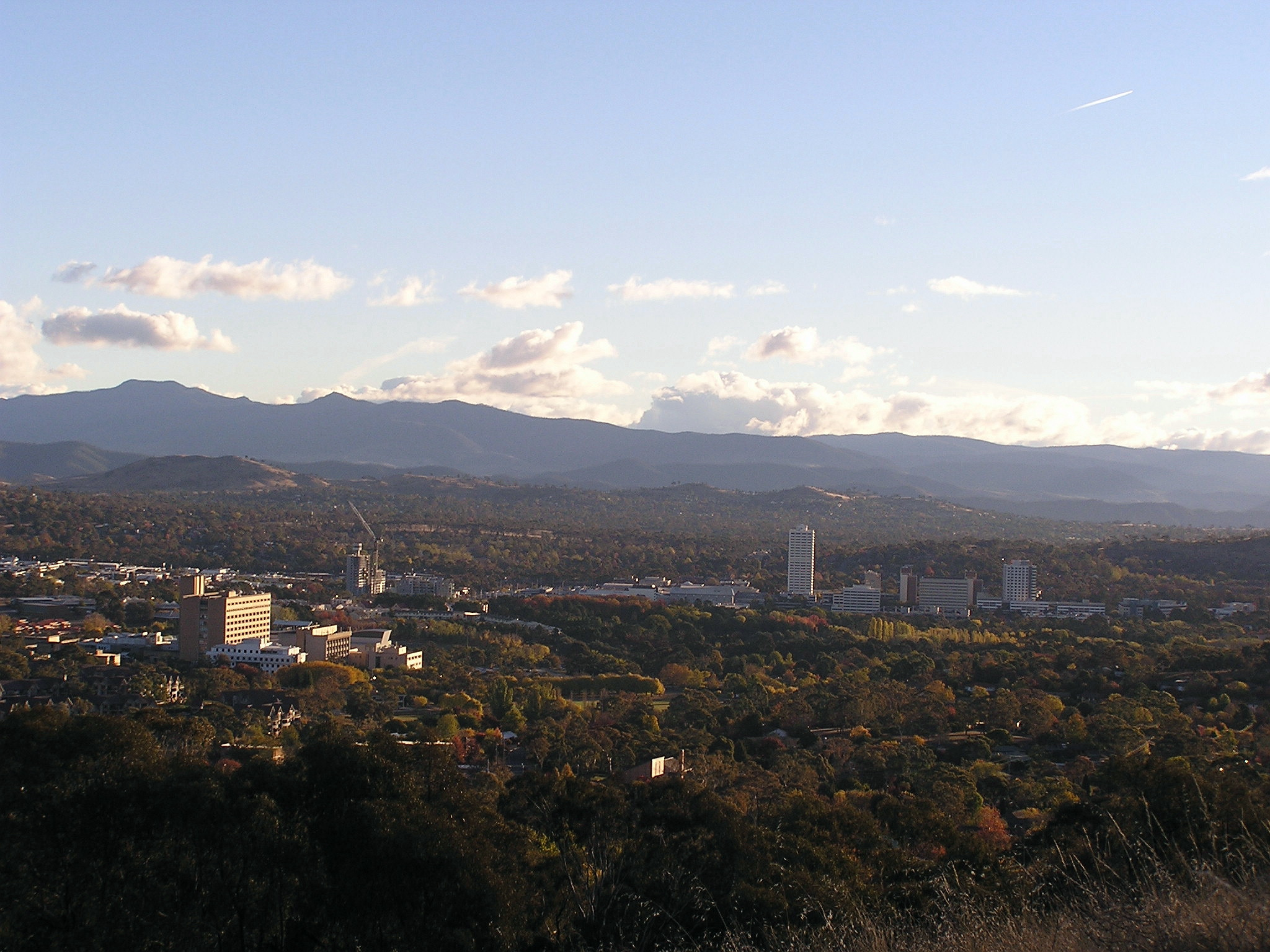
- Woden Valley from Red Hill looking across the suburb of Garran in the foreground to the Brindabella Ranges. The Canberra Hospital is to the left and the Woden Town Centre is to the right in the middle distance.

- Interactive map of Woden Valley
- Coordinates: 35.3452°S 149.095°E
- Country: Australia
- State: Australian Capital Territory
- Location: 7 km (4.3 mi) S of Canberra

Government
  - Territory electorate: Murrumbidgee
  - Federal divisions: Bean; Canberra

Area
  - Total: 28.6 km^{2} (11.0 sq mi)

Population
  - Total: 39,279 (2021 census)
  - Density: 1,373.4/km^{2} (3,557/sq mi)
- Gazetted: 12 May 1966
Localities around Woden Valley
Molonglo Valley	Canberra Central	Canberra Central
Weston Creek	Woden Valley	Jerrabomberra
Tuggeranong	Tuggeranong	Jerrabomberra

Woden Valley (/ˈwoʊdɪn/) is a district in the Australian Capital Territory in Australia. The district is subdivided into divisions (suburbs), sections and blocks.

The name of Woden Valley is taken from the name of a nearby homestead owned by James Murray who named the homestead in October 1837 after the Old English god of wisdom, Woden. He named it this as he was to spend his life in the pursuit of wisdom. However, historian Harold Koch considers that the name may have its origins in the Aboriginal word for possum, either wadyan or wadhan, influenced in interpretation by the term known to English speakers of 'Woden'.

In 1964 it was the first satellite city to be built, separate from the district of Canberra Central. It has its own shopping centre, employment opportunities and accommodation with twelve suburbs arranged around the Woden Town Centre. At the 2021 census, the population of the district was 39,279.

== Establishment and governance ==
Following the transfer of land from the Government of New South Wales to the Commonwealth Government in 1911, the district was established in 1966 by the Commonwealth via the gazettal of the Districts Ordinance 1966 (Cth) which, after the enactment of the Australian Capital Territory (Self-Government) Act 1988, became the Districts Act 1966. This Act was subsequently repealed by the ACT Government and the district is now administered subject to the Districts Act 2002.

== Representation ==
Woden Valley is represented by:

- ACT Legislative Assembly: The Australian Capital Territory (ACT) was granted self-government by the Commonwealth Parliament in 1988 with the passage of the Australian Capital Territory (Self-Government) Act 1988. The first Assembly was elected in 1989. There are currently 25 members of the Legislative Assembly (MLAs). Members are elected every four years by the people of the ACT to represent them and make decisions on their behalf. The ACT Legislative Assembly has five multi-member electorates: Yerrabi; Ginninderra; Kurrajong; Murrumbidgee and; Brindabella, each electing five members.
- Woden Valley Community Council: Woden Valley Community Council (WVCC) engages as widely as possible with the Woden community on a range of issues that affect the Woden community. The council is recognised by and engages with the ACT Government on behalf of Woden residents. The WVCC Is not a local government.

== Location and urban structure ==
The district is a set of contiguous residential suburbs that surround the Woden Town Centre, which includes a major shopping centre, called Westfield Woden, or more commonly known as Woden Plaza. Woden is also home to the third and former tallest building in Canberra, Lovett Tower, which stands at 93 metres. Lovett Tower and a number of other buildings host staff from Australian Government agencies; there is also some light industrial development in the town centre.

Within the district are a number of community facilities including the Phillip campus of the Canberra College, a secondary school catering to years 11 and 12 (16 – 18 years old); a library, the Woden Youth Centre, and the Canberra Hospital, which is located in the north of the district.

== Early homesteads ==
In the mid-1920s following World War I, much of the Woden Valley was granted to returned soldiers under the soldier settlement lease scheme. Four of the earliest homesteads established in the valley were Yamba, Yarra Glen, Melrose and Illoura.

Yamba. In 1920, Walter Eddison was granted a soldier settlement lease on the 764 acres (309 ha) Woden Block 132, covering roughly the present-day suburbs of Phillip and Swinger Hill. In 1925, he applied for an additional block and was granted the 1,601 acres (648 ha) Woden Block 28A, which extended further south covering the present-day suburbs of Pearce and Torrens. Walter initially continued to live at his property The Oaks in Queanbeyan while farming his new property, but then established his homestead Yamba on the property in 1926 and worked the land with his three sons, Tom, Keith and Jack. In 1929, 43 acres (17 ha) were withdrawn from block 28A for the construction of the Woden Cemetery (Woden Block 30). Walter's three sons all fought overseas during World War II, and sadly all three were killed and buried overseas. The Yamba homestead was located in the vicinity of present-day 11 Irving Street, Phillip. Eddison Park in Woden is named in honour of the Eddison family. The main north–south arterial road passing to the east of central Woden was named Yamba Drive in honour of the former property.

Yarra Glen. Frank Gifford was granted a soldier settler lease on the 779 acres (315 ha) Woden Block 32 in 1920, and a lease on the adjacent 825 acres (334 ha) Block 39 in 1922, and named his property Yarra Glenn. In August 1925, the two blocks were merged to become the smaller 1,200 acres (490 ha) Block 27A, which extended from the vicinity of the present-day Royal Australian Mint south to include the present-day suburb of Hughes. In 1927, Gifford sold the lease to George Campbell, a descendant of Robert Campbell of Duntroon. George worked the property with his two sons, Robert and Curtis. The Yarra Glen homestead was located near the intersection of present-day Carruthers Street and Yarra Glen, Curtin. The large conifer on the Yarra Glen median strip near the Carruthers Street overpass was once part of the homestead garden, and the row of large trees to the left (east) of the southbound Yarra Glen offramp were originally a windbreak for the homestead's garden. The main parkway connecting Woden Valley with central Canberra, constructed in 1966, was named Yarra Glenn after the former property.

Melrose. Jack Maguire was granted a 10-year soldier settler lease for the 994 acres (402 ha) Woden Block 25A in 1926. His block covered much of present-day suburbs of Curtin, Lyons and Chifley. He initially called his property Oakey Hill and used it solely for grazing sheep. He built a home on the property in 1927, and renamed the property Melrose. There is a sign marking the location of the former homestead on the pathway between present-day Theodore Street and James Place, Curtin. Maguire farmed Melrose until 1963 when the land was resumed by the government to establish suburbs in Woden Valley. Melrose Drive and Melrose High School were named after the Maguire's property.

Illoura. Thomas Cargill was offered a ten-year soldier settlement lease for the 1,015 acres (411 ha) Woden Block 26A in 1926, which extended from present-day Curtin and Lyons across to present-day North Weston to the west. In 1928 he sold his lease to Guy Tanner, and the Tanner family continued to farm the area until the property was resumed in the early 1970s. Illoura homestead was located between present-day Tuggeranong Parkway and the edge of the present-day suburb of Curtin, in what is currently known as the Illoura agistment paddocks. The homestead was located just to the southeast of the Tuggeranong Parkway / Cotter Road intersection. A clump of large eucalyptus trees still visible to the left of where the southbound onramp meets the Parkway marks the former location of the homestead.

== Residential development ==
In the early 1960s the National Capital Development Commission developed plans to establish 10 suburbs in the Woden Valley to house an estimated 55,000 residents. Work commenced on the first two suburbs, Hughes and Curtin, in late-1962. Some of the first homes built in Curtin were advertised for £6,870 to £8,055. Hughes was officially declared open on 9 May 1964. Chifley and Lyons were the next suburbs to be developed (1965), followed by Garran, Pearce and Torrens (1966), Mawson, Farrer and Phillip (1966), O'Malley (1973) and Isaacs (1986).

By late-1965, in the earlier stages of Woden Valley's development, there were complaints from local residents that the new suburbs lacked shopping and recreational facilities, and the first schools in the area, such as Curtin Primary, were overcrowded as surrounding suburbs were developed.

The first section of Hindmarsh Drive, connecting Woden Valley with Fyshwick and South Canberra, opened in December 1966. Yarra Glen, connecting Woden Valley with the City, opened in November 1967.

== Demographics ==
Historical population
Year	Pop.	±%
2001 census	31,336	—
2006 census	31,992	+2.1%
2011 census	32,958	+3.0%
2016 census	34,760	+5.5%
2021 census	39,279	+13.0%

At the 2021 census, there were 34,760 people in the Woden Valley district, of these 48.7 per cent were male and 51.3 per cent were female. Aboriginal and Torres Strait Islander people made up 1.4 per cent of the population, which was lower than the national and territory averages. The median age of people in the Woden Valley district was 39 years, which was slightly higher than the national median of 38 years. Children aged 0 – 14 years made up 17.4 per cent of the population and people aged 65 years and over made up 18.5 per cent of the population. Of people in the area aged 15 years and over, 50.4 per cent were married and 10.1 per cent were either divorced or separated. The median weekly income for residents within the Woden Valley district was significantly higher than the national average, and similar to the territory average.

At the 2021 census, the most common ancestries reported in the Woden Valley area were English (31.7 per cent), Australian (29.4 per cent), Irish (12.9 per cent), Scottish (10.7 per cent) and Indian (4.9 per cent). 40.3 per cent of residents described themselves as having "No Religion", higher than the national average at 38.4 per cent. Households in the Woden Valley district had a slightly higher than average proportion (27.5 per cent) where a language other than English was spoken at home (national average was 24.8 per cent); and a slightly lower proportion (71.0 per cent) where only English was spoken at home (national average was 72.0 per cent).

Selected historical census data for the Woden Valley district
Census year		2001	2006	2011	2016	2021
Population	Estimated residents on census night	31,336	31,992	32,958	34,760	39,279
Population	District rank in terms of size within the Australian Capital Territory	4th	4th	▼5th	5th	5th
Population	Percentage of the Australian Capital Territory population			9.23%	8.75%	7.11%
Population	Percentage of the Australian population	0.17%	▼0.16%	▼0.15%	0.15%	0.15%
Cultural and language diversity						
Ancestry, top responses	English			24.1%	23.7%	31.7%
Ancestry, top responses	Australian			24.6%	21.4%	29.4%
Ancestry, top responses	Irish			10.0%	9.9%	12.9%
Ancestry, top responses	Scottish			7.6%	7.2%	10.7%
Ancestry, top responses	Indian				4.0%	4.9%
Language, top responses (other than English)	Nepali					▲2.6%
Language, top responses (other than English)	Mandarin	0.9%	▲1.2%	▲1.4%	▲2.2%	▲2.3%
Language, top responses (other than English)	Malayalam			▲0.9%	▲2.2%	▼1.3%
Language, top responses (other than English)	Italian	1.4%	▼1.3%	▼1.2%	▼1.1%	
Language, top responses (other than English)	Tamil				0.9%	
Language, top responses (other than English)	Greek	1.1%	1.1%	1.1%	▼0.9%	
Religious affiliation						
Religious affiliation, top responses	No Religion	19.5%	▲23.0%	▲27.7%	▲32.3%	▲40.3%
Religious affiliation, top responses	Catholic	28.2%	▼27.9%	▼27.5%	▼25.5%	▼21.3%
Religious affiliation, top responses	Anglican	18.7%	▼16.2%	▼14.0%	▼10.2%	▼8.4%
Religious affiliation, top responses	Hinduism	n/c	n/c	▲2.6%	▲3.4%	▲6.2%
Religious affiliation, top responses	Uniting Church	4.6%	4.2%	▼3.4%	▼2.6%	
Median weekly incomes						
Personal income	Median weekly personal income		A$769	A$948	A$1,044	A$1,265
Personal income	Percentage of Australian median income		165%	▼164%	▼158%	▼157%
Family income	Median weekly family income		A$1,884	A$2,390	A$2,554	A$3,106
Family income	Percentage of Australian median income		160%	▲161%	▼147%	147%
Household income	Median weekly household income		A$1,471	A$1,824	A$2,040	A$2,375
Household income	Percentage of Australian median income		143%	▲148%	▼142%	▼136%
Dwelling structure						
Type	Separate house	69.4%	▼68.3%	▼68.0%	▼63.5%	▼58.3%
Type	Semi-detached, row or terrace house, townhouse etc.	12.5%	▲15.0%	▼13.4%	▲20.4%	▲20.3%
Type	Flat, unit or apartment	17.5%	▼16.4%	▲18.6%	▼15.9%	▲21.3%

== List of suburbs ==
- Chifley
- Curtin
- Farrer
- Garran
- Hughes
- Isaacs
- Lyons
- Mawson
- O'Malley
- Pearce
- Phillip
- Torrens

== Places of note and interest ==
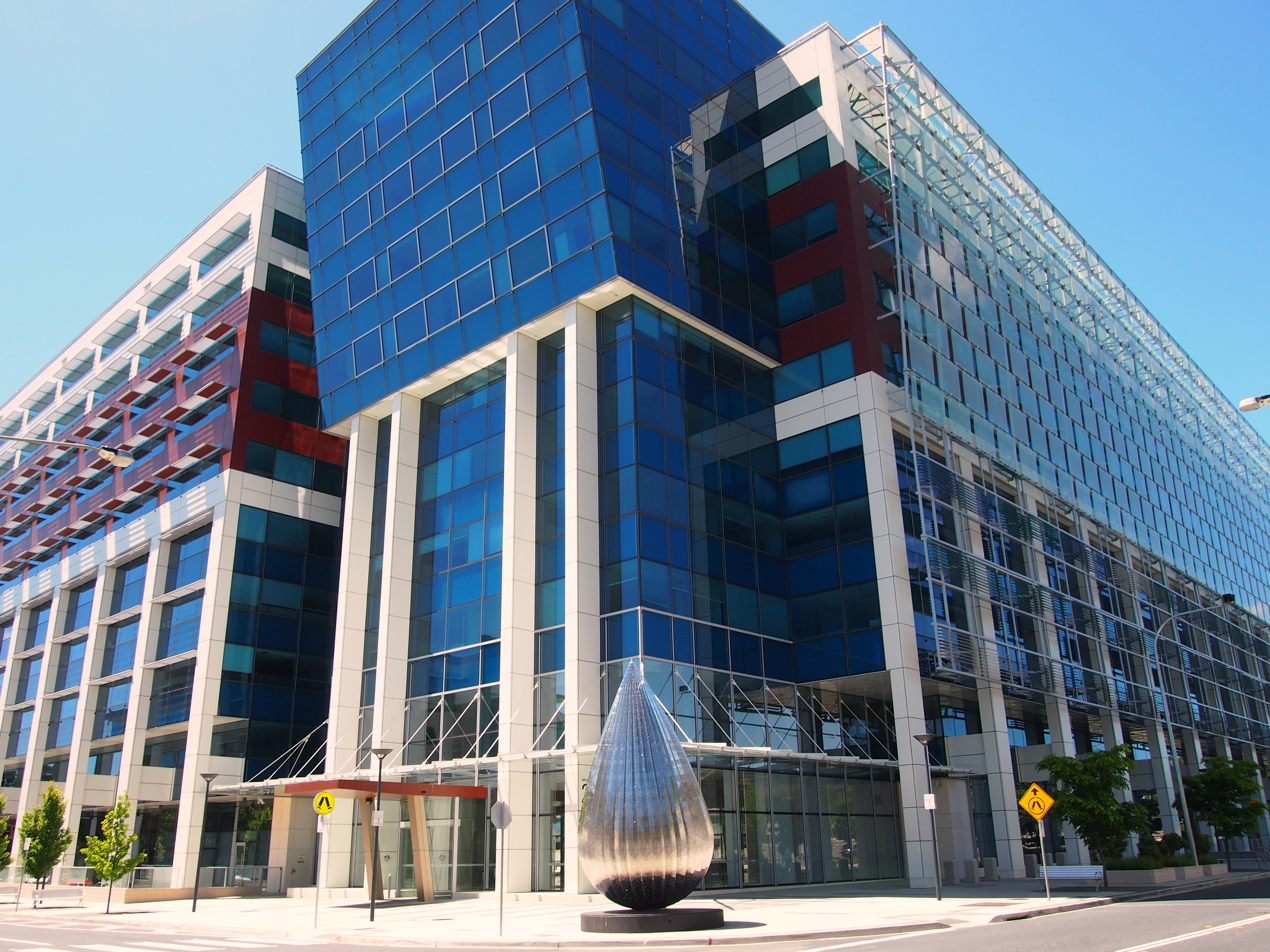
The Sirius building, head office of the Department of Health, located in the Woden Town Centre.

- Australian Department of Health head office, located in the Sirius building, in the Woden Town Centre.
- IP Australia, Australia's equivalent to the US Patent Office, is located in the Woden Town Centre.
- Woden Bus Interchange.
- Woden Storm Water Drain - one of twenty-six legal graffiti sites within the Australian Capital Territory. The walls of the drain display colourful murals for many hundreds of metres from local, interstate and overseas graffiti artists.

=== Churches ===
- Canberra Austral-Asian Christian Church
- Holy Trinity Catholic Church, Curtin
- Hughes Baptist Church
- Immanuel Community Church
- Immanuel Lutheran Church, Lyons
- Lyons Church of Christm Lyons
- New Apostolic Church, Mawson
- Sacred Heart Church, Pearce
- St Alban's Anglican Church, Lyons
- St George's Anglican Church, Pearce
- St James Uniting Church, Curtin
- Sts Peter & Paul's Catholic Church
- St Sava Serbian Orthodox Church
- The Salvation Army, Woden Valley
- Woden Valley Bible Church
- The Anglican Church of the Good Shepherd, Curtin
- The Church of Jesus Christ of Latter-day Saints, Garran
- NationLight Church Canberra, Phillip

=== Sport ===
Woden Valley is a vital area when it comes to sport in the Territory. Its association football club, Woden Valley FC (Woden Rival), is very popular amongst juniors. Woden Valley also has a rugby league team Woden Rams and an Australian rules football team (Woden Blues).

== Natural disasters ==
=== Bushfires ===
While the majority of the destruction caused by the 2003 Canberra bushfires occurred in the Weston Creek district, in the Woden Valley suburbs of Curtin, three houses were destroyed; in Lyons, four houses; and in Torrens, two houses. Curtin, in particular, has been threatened by bushfires several times since its construction.

=== Floods ===
On Australia Day in 1971 a flash flood at Yarra Glen killed seven people. The drains and roads in the area have since been redesigned to avoid future flood casualties.

== See also ==
- Woden Valley Youth Choir
