= Lyons, Australian Capital Territory =

Lyons
- Suburb
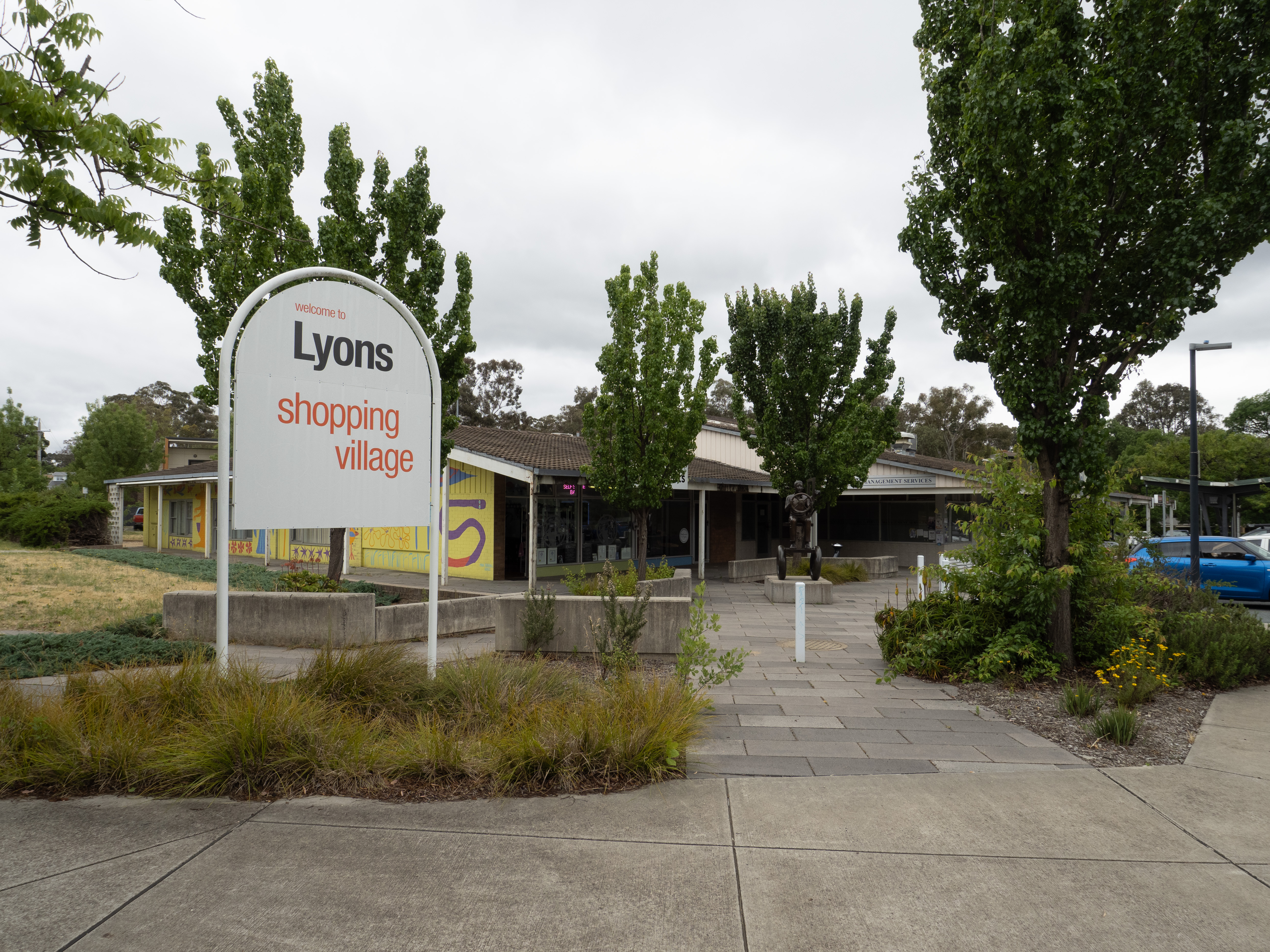
- Lyons shopping centre

- Coordinates: 35.342°S 149.076°E
- Country: Australia
- State: Australian Capital Territory
- City: Canberra
- District: Woden Valley
- Location: 10 km (6.2 mi) SW of Canberra CBD; 17 km (11 mi) W of Queanbeyan; 104 km (65 mi) SW of Goulburn; 301 km (187 mi) SW of Sydney
- Established: 1965

Government
  - Territory electorate: Murrumbidgee
  - Federal division: Canberra

Area
  - Total: 2.3 km^{2} (0.89 sq mi)
- Elevation: 598 m (1,962 ft)

Population
  - Total: 3,271 (SAL 2021)
- Postcode: 2606
Suburbs around Lyons
Weston	Curtin	Curtin, Hughes
Weston	Lyons	Phillip
Waramanga	Chifley	Phillip

Lyons is a suburb in the Canberra, Australia district of Woden.

The suburb was named after Joseph Lyons, Labor Premier of Tasmania from 1923 to 1928 and a Minister in the James Scullin government from 1929 until his resignation from the Labor Party in March 1931. He subsequently led the United Australia Party and was the tenth Prime Minister of Australia from January 1932 until his death in 1939.

The suburb is bounded by Melrose Drive, Tuggeranong Parkway and Hindmarsh Drive. Oakey Hill Nature Reserve, part of Canberra Nature Park, is located within the suburb. The reserve has a number of walking trails and views across Woden and Weston Creek and into Civic. The suburb has a local shopping centre and neighbourhood oval. A former petrol station has since been demolished. Lyons Early Learning School caters for children from birth to grade two through an on-site childcare provider amalgamated with the school.

Streets in Lyons are named after locations in Tasmania.

== Geology ==
Deakin Volcanics green-grey and purple rhyodacite in the west strip along Hindmarsh Drive and on Oakey Hill. Deakin Volcanics purple and green tuff in south east and north west. Deakin Volcanics Pink and green rhyodacitic porphyry is in the west on the higher parts. Yarralumla Formation calcareous shale is in the centre and along Devonport Street and in the north east. Mount Painter Volcanics cream rhyolite in the mid north. In Lyons it is evident that the Deakin Volcanics are laid on top of the Yarralumla Formation, which in turn overlies the Mount Painter Volcanics. A fault running east–west shows itself as a line of quartz on the surface of the ground. An anticline heads in a north–south orientation through the east of the suburb. The Deakin acid Volcanics can be observed in cuttings along Tuggeranong Parkway, and Devonport Street.

== Churches ==
- Immanuel Community Church
- Lyons Church of Christ
- St Alban's Anglican Church

== Education ==
Lyons residents get preference for:

- Lyons Early Childhood School
- A shared Priority Enrollment Area (PEA) of Curtin Primary and Hughes Primary
- Alfred Deakin High School
- Canberra College

== Public art ==
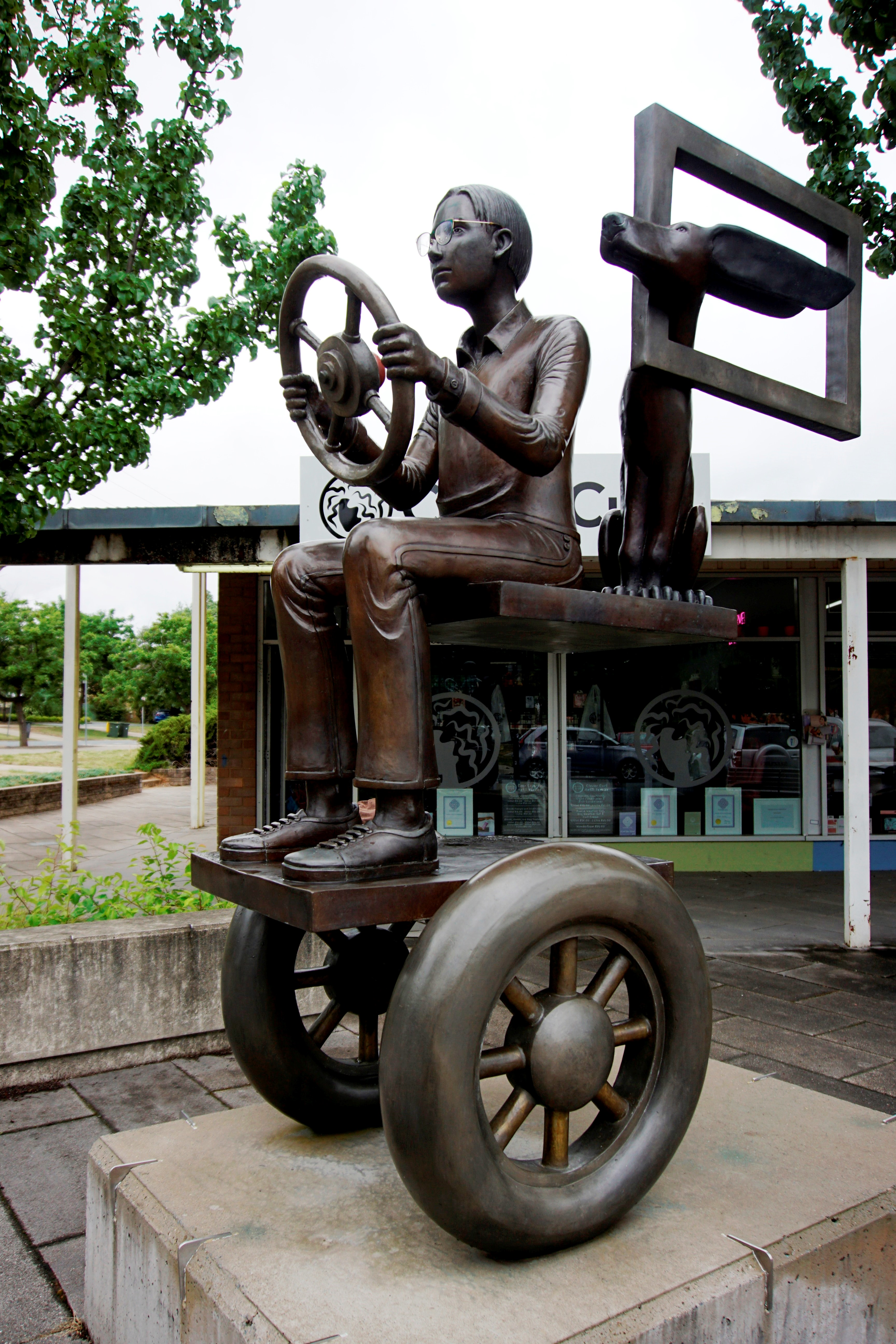
On the Road Again, by Anne Ross

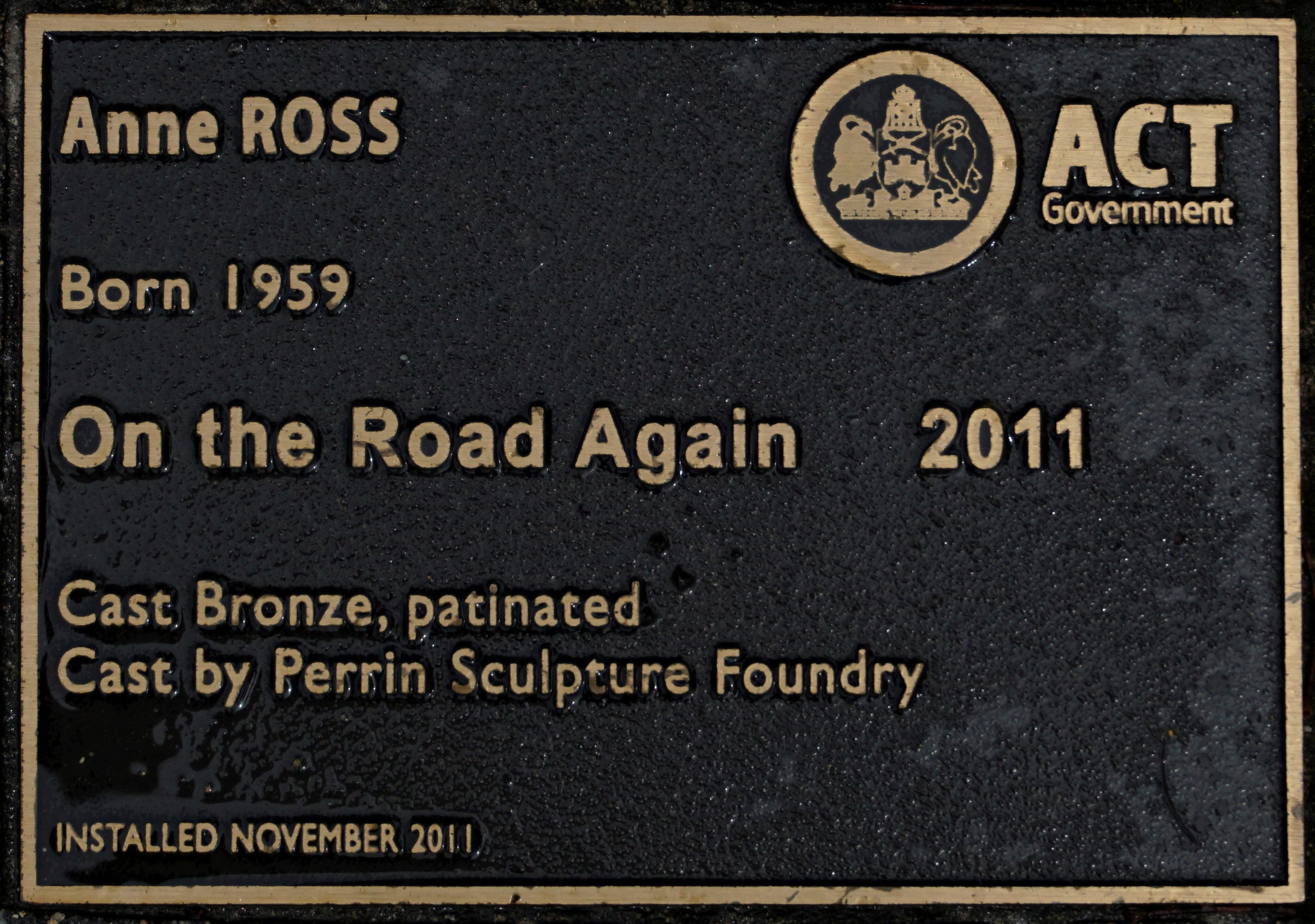
Plaque
