= Garran, Australian Capital Territory =

Garran
- Suburb
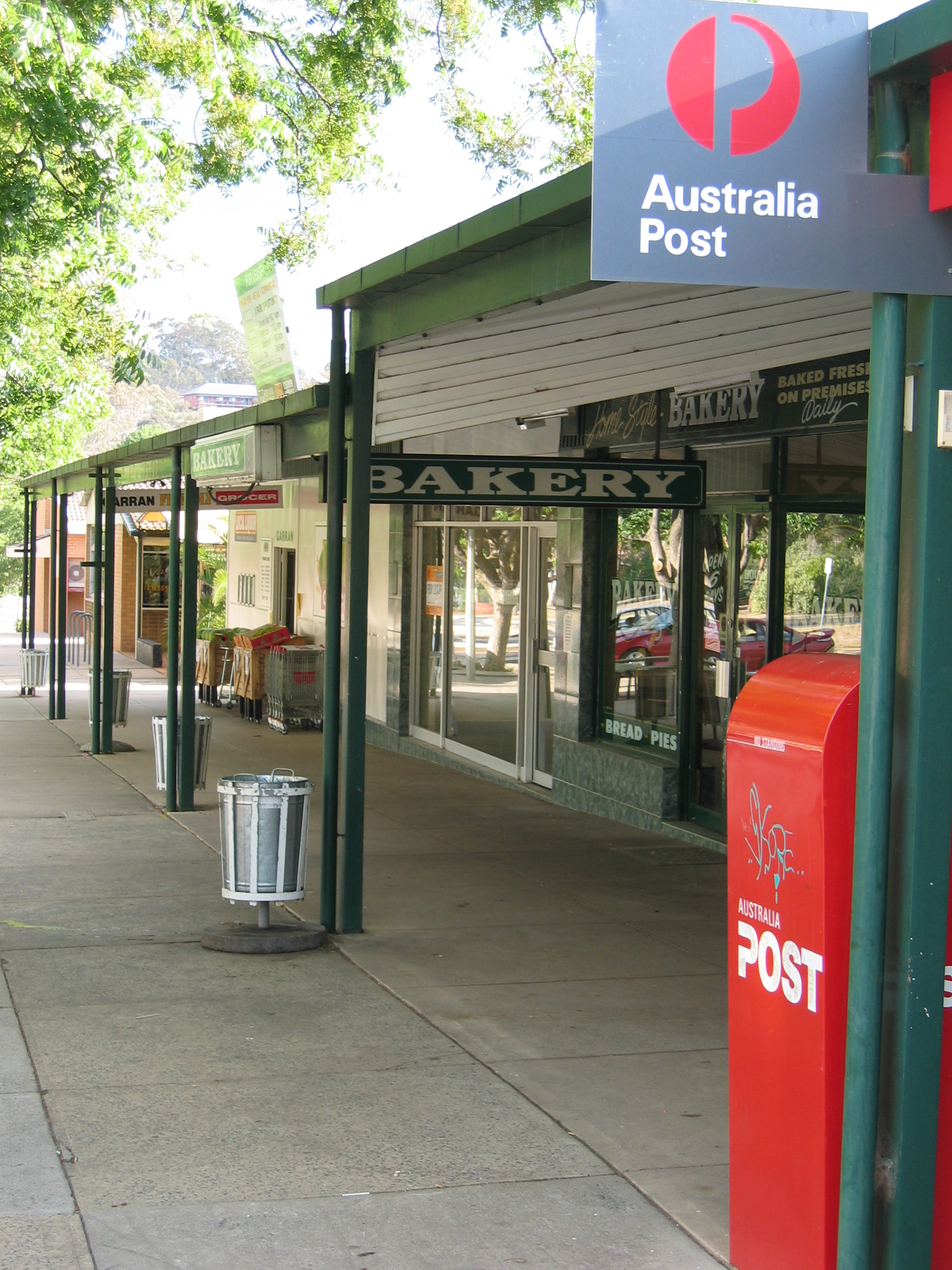
- Garran local shops

- Coordinates: 35.342°S 149.108°E
- Country: Australia
- State: Australian Capital Territory
- City: Canberra
- District: Woden Valley
- Location: 10 km (6.2 mi) S of Canberra CBD; 14 km (8.7 mi) W of Queanbeyan; 101 km (63 mi) SW of Goulburn; 298 km (185 mi) SW of Sydney
- Established: 1966

Government
  - Territory electorate: Murrumbidgee
  - Federal division: Canberra

Area
  - Total: 2.7 km^{2} (1.0 sq mi)
- Elevation: 620 m (2,030 ft)

Population
  - Total: 3,706 (2021 census)
  - Density: 1,373/km^{2} (3,550/sq mi)
- Postcode: 2605
Suburbs around Garran
Hughes	Red Hill	Red Hill
Phillip	Garran	Red Hill
Phillip	O'Malley	Symonston

Garran is a suburb in the Woden district of Canberra in the Australian Capital Territory. Garran was named after Sir Robert Garran who made numerous contributions to the development of higher education in Canberra. The streets in Garran are named after Australian writers. The suburb was first developed in 1966 and has an area of 2.74 km^{2}.

== Demographics ==
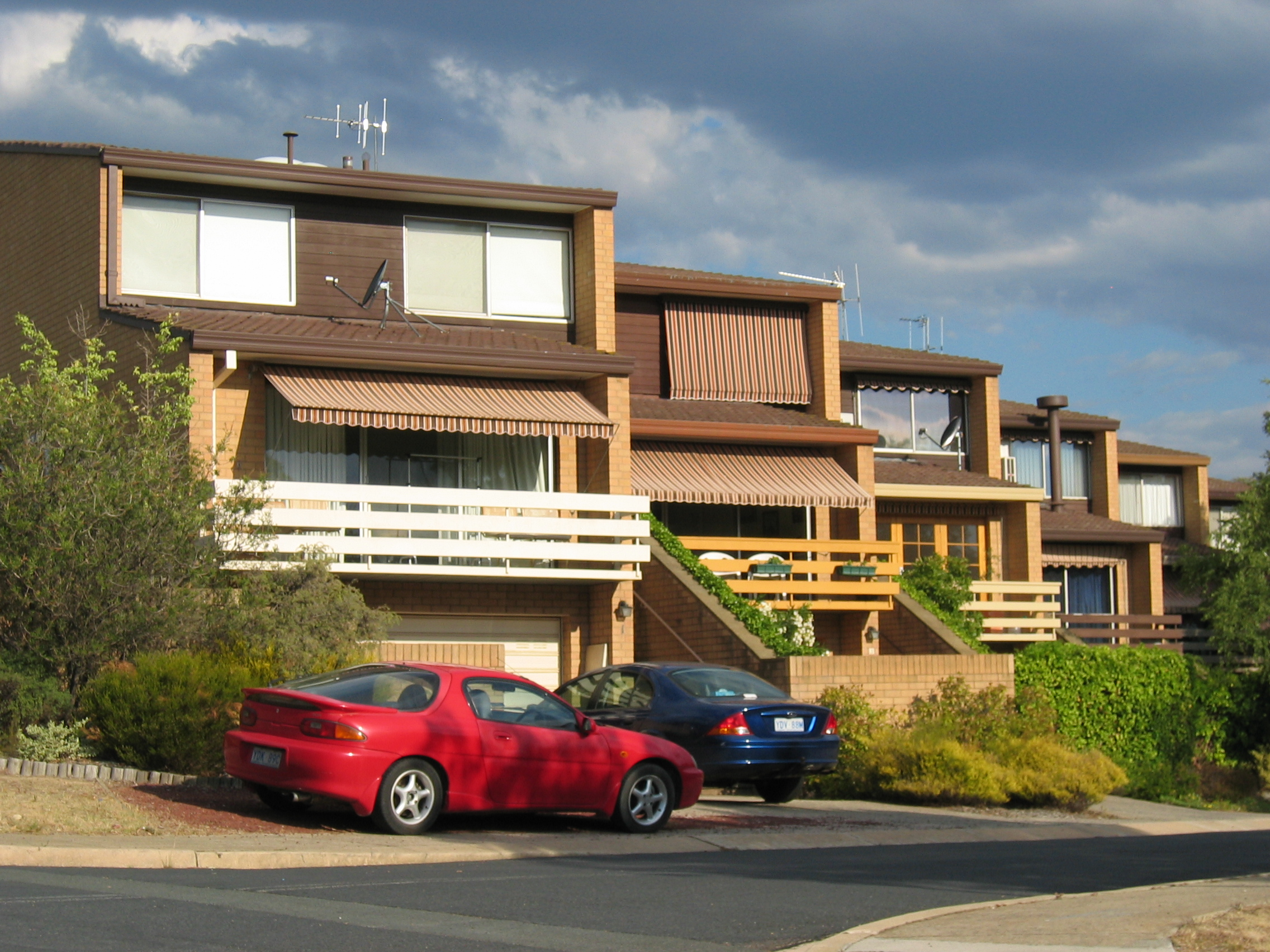
1970s townhouses in Garran

At the 2021 census, Garran had a population of 3,706 people. 61.9% of people were born in Australia. The next most common countries of birth were India (6.8%) and England (3.9%). 66.8% of people spoke only English at home. Other languages spoken at home included Mandarin (3.0%), Telugu (2.5%) and Malayalam (2.3%). The most common responses for religion were No Religion (38.5%) and Catholic (21.5%).

== Geology ==
Garran contains volcanic materials from the Silurian Age. Deakin volcanics purple and green tuff is under the Canberra hospital, around Ingamells Street in the north and the base of Davidson Hill. Deakin Volcanics coarse dark purple rhyodacite is under Fitchett Street and Couvreur Street areas. Deakin Volcanics green grey and purple rhyodacite is in the centre and south of Garran.

== Suburb amenities ==
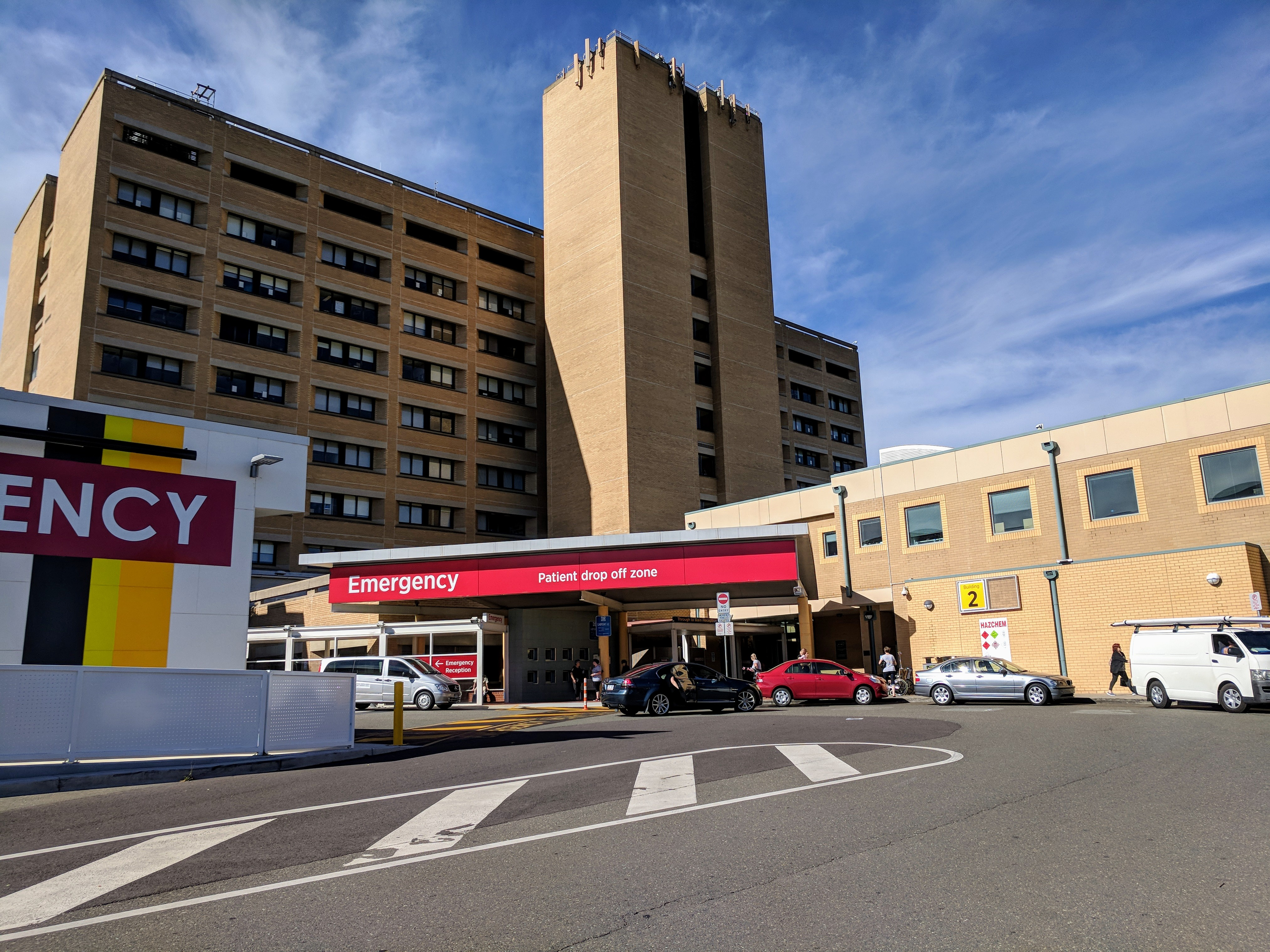
The Canberra Hospital is located in Garran

The Canberra Hospital is located in Garran. The suburb also contains three primary schools: a government school, Garran Primary; a special school for the intellectually disabled, Malkara School and a Catholic school, Sts. Peter & Paul Primary School.
