= Curtin, Australian Capital Territory =

Curtin
- Suburb
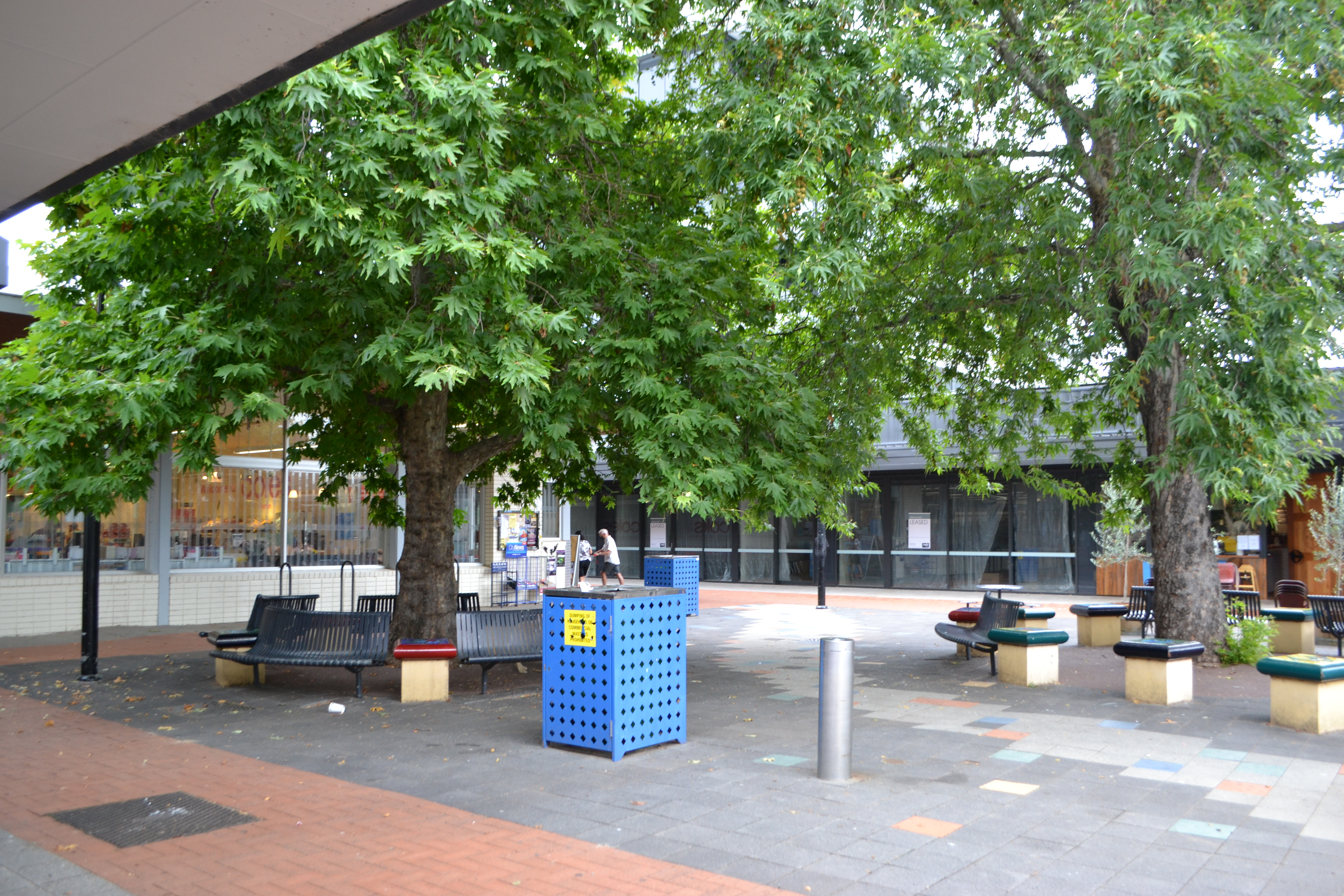
- Curtin local shops

- Coordinates: 35°19′30″S 149°04′40″E
- Country: Australia
- State: Australian Capital Territory
- City: Canberra
- District: Woden Valley
- Location: 8 km (5.0 mi) SW of Canberra CBD; 17 km (11 mi) W of Queanbeyan; 101 km (63 mi) SW of Goulburn; 298 km (185 mi) SW of Sydney
- Established: 1962

Government
  - Territory electorate: Murrumbidgee
  - Federal division: Canberra

Area
  - Total: 4.8 km^{2} (1.9 sq mi)
- Elevation: 587 m (1,926 ft)

Population
  - Total: 5,569 (2021 census)
  - Density: 1,160/km^{2} (3,005/sq mi)
- Postcode: 2605
Suburbs around Curtin
| Stromlo Forest | Yarralumla | Deakin |
| Weston | Curtin | Hughes |
| Weston | Lyons | Phillip |

Curtin (/ˈkɜːrtɪn/) is a suburb in Canberra, Australia, part of the Woden Valley district.

Curtin is named after John Curtin, Australian Prime Minister between 1941 and 1945. Its streets are named after state premiers.

It is next to the suburbs of Yarralumla, Deakin, Hughes, Lyons and Weston. It is bounded by the Cotter Road, Tuggeranong Parkway, Yarra Glen and a green strip between it and Lyons to the south.

Curtin shopping centre offers the following services: Coles supermarket, post office, newsagent, bank, real estate agent, chemist, hairdresser, barber, travel agent, optometrist, florist, bakery, greengrocer and numerous cafes and coffee shops. Of note is the Curtin Milk Bar which was the longest running cafe in the area. Its style and operation remained unchanged since the 1970s until its closure in December 2017. Nearby is Curtin Scout Hall.

Areas of Curtin were designed in accordance with the Radburn model of suburban design and public housing. In Australia, the Radburn model was used in the planning of some Canberra suburbs developed in the 1960s, in particular Charnwood, Curtin and Garran, and a small part of Hughes. These pockets of Radburn design have not seen the same anti-social and crime-related problems that have plagued similar areas in Western and South-Western Sydney, such as Mt Druitt.

The Canberra bushfires of 2003 destroyed four Curtin homes and caused damage to others. The Emergency Services Bureau, based in Curtin, which was the centre of command for the firefighting operation, came under threat itself when its roof caught fire.

The suburb celebrated the fiftieth anniversary of the arrival of its first residents in 2014. As part of that celebration, the Canberra & District Historical Society, which is headquartered at the shops, helped local residents to record oral histories of their memories. They can be accessed on a Web site called Curtin Living Memories. Residents subsequently compiled and published a book on life in the suburb called, Curtin Turns 50.

== Demographics ==
At the 2021 census, there were 5,569 people in Curtin. 73.4% of people were born in Australia. The next most common countries of birth were England 3.8% and India 1.8%. 81.6% of people spoke only English at home. The most common responses for religion in Curtin were No Religion 46.8%, Catholic 21.5% and Anglican 9.8%.

== Geology ==
Curtin has much Mount Painter Volcanics dark grey to grey green crystal tuff. Some cream rhyolite is found in the far east along Yarralumla creek, which runs through the edge of the suburb. Sediments such as shale and sandstone are found in the far north east corner, north of Yarralumla creek. To the west of Curtin there are horse paddocks that contain sequence of rocks getting younger as you head west. First a band of Mount Painter Volcanics cream rhyolite, followed by a band of Yarralumla Formation calcareous shale, followed by Deakin Volcanics purple and green tuff, and lastly Deakin Volcanics green-grey and purple rhyolite. All of these rock types are from the Silurian age.

== Features ==
=== Churches ===
- Anglican Church of the Good Shepherd
- Holy Trinity (Catholic)
- St James Uniting Church

=== Accommodation ===
- Fred Ward Gardens nursing home
- L’Arche Genesaret special needs housing
- Statesman Hotel

=== Parks ===
- South Curtin neighbourhood oval
- Illoura Community Horse Holding Paddocks
- North Curtin Horse Paddocks
- North Curtin Oval

=== Services ===
- QEII Family Centre
- Canberra & District Historical Society
