= Chifley, Australian Capital Territory =

Chifley
- Suburb
- Coordinates: 35°21′04″S 149°04′40″E
- Country: Australia
- State: Australian Capital Territory
- City: Canberra
- District: Woden Valley
- Location: 12 km (7.5 mi) SW of Canberra CBD; 16 km (9.9 mi) W of Queanbeyan; 105 km (65 mi) SW of Goulburn; 302 km (188 mi) SW of Sydney
- Established: 1966

Government
  - Territory electorate: Murrumbidgee
  - Federal division: Bean

Area
  - Total: 1.6 km^{2} (0.62 sq mi)
- Elevation: 618 m (2,028 ft)

Population
  - Total: 2,680 (2021 census)
  - Density: 1,680/km^{2} (4,340/sq mi)
- Postcode: 2606
Suburbs around Chifley
Weston	Lyons
Waramanga	Chifley	Phillip
Canberra Nature Park	Pearce

Chifley is a suburb of Canberra, Australia, in the district of Woden Valley. The suburb's area is 1.6 square kilometres (0.62 mi^{2}).

It was named after Joseph Benedict Chifley, Prime Minister of Australia from July 1945 to December 1949. The streets of Chifley are named for scientists and educationalists.

It is next to the suburbs of Pearce, Lyons and Phillip. Behind it stands Mount Taylor, which is a nature park. It is bordered by Hindmarsh Drive and Melrose Drive. A local shopping centre and Chifley Neighbourhood Oval are located in the suburb.

== History ==
Chifley was established on 12 May 1966, which was around the same time when the Woden Valley was also established, thus making it one of the original settlement spots in the southern part of Canberra. The Districts Ordinance 1966 No. 5 (Cth) became, after the enactment of the Australian Capital Territory (Self-Government) Act 1988, the Districts Act 1966. This Act was subsequently repealed by the ACT Government and the district is now administered subject to the Districts Act 2002.

Construction in the suburb itself also began in 1966, with 795 houses and 156 flats built to accommodate approximately 3,000 people. Most of the streets in Chifley were named after academics.

The Canberra bushfires of 2003 engulfed multiple parts of Canberra on 18 January 2003 and also reached the Mount Taylor Nature Reserve which Chifley borders with. Thankfully the fires did not reach into Chifley or caused minimal damage in the suburb. in 2014, ACT Disability Minister Joy Burch, alongside Canberra Raiders coach Ricky Stuart launched a new respite centre project for children with disabilities. The facility will serve 30 to 40 families annually, and the ACT Government has funded the project with $1 million.

== Geology ==
Chifley is underlaid by Silurian age Deakin Volcanics rhyodacite which are coloured green-grey, red or purple.

== Demographics ==
At the 2021 census, Chifley had a total population of 2,680 people: 48.2% were males and 51.8% were females. The median age of people in Chifley was 37 years, above the median age for Canberra of 35. The median individual income for Chifley was $1,191. Median household income was $2,347and the median income for families was $2,940, which was above the Australian average.

Around 67.3% of the residents in Chifley were born in Australia. The three main countries of birth for those born overseas were Nepal (4.1%), India (3.7%), England (2.8%), Bhutan (2.2%) and China (1.8%). 71.3% of people spoke only English at home. The most popular religious affiliations in descending order were No Religion (41.9%), Catholic (20.1%), Hinduism (7.7%), and Anglican (7.3%).

== Politics ==
Chifley is located in the federal House of Representatives electorate of Bean, which is the largest division in the Australian Capital Territory. The electorate of Bean is represented by David Smith of the Australian Labor Party.

Chifley is located in the ACT Legislative Assembly electorate of Murrumbidgee. The electorate elects five members on the basis of proportional representation.

== Suburb amenities ==
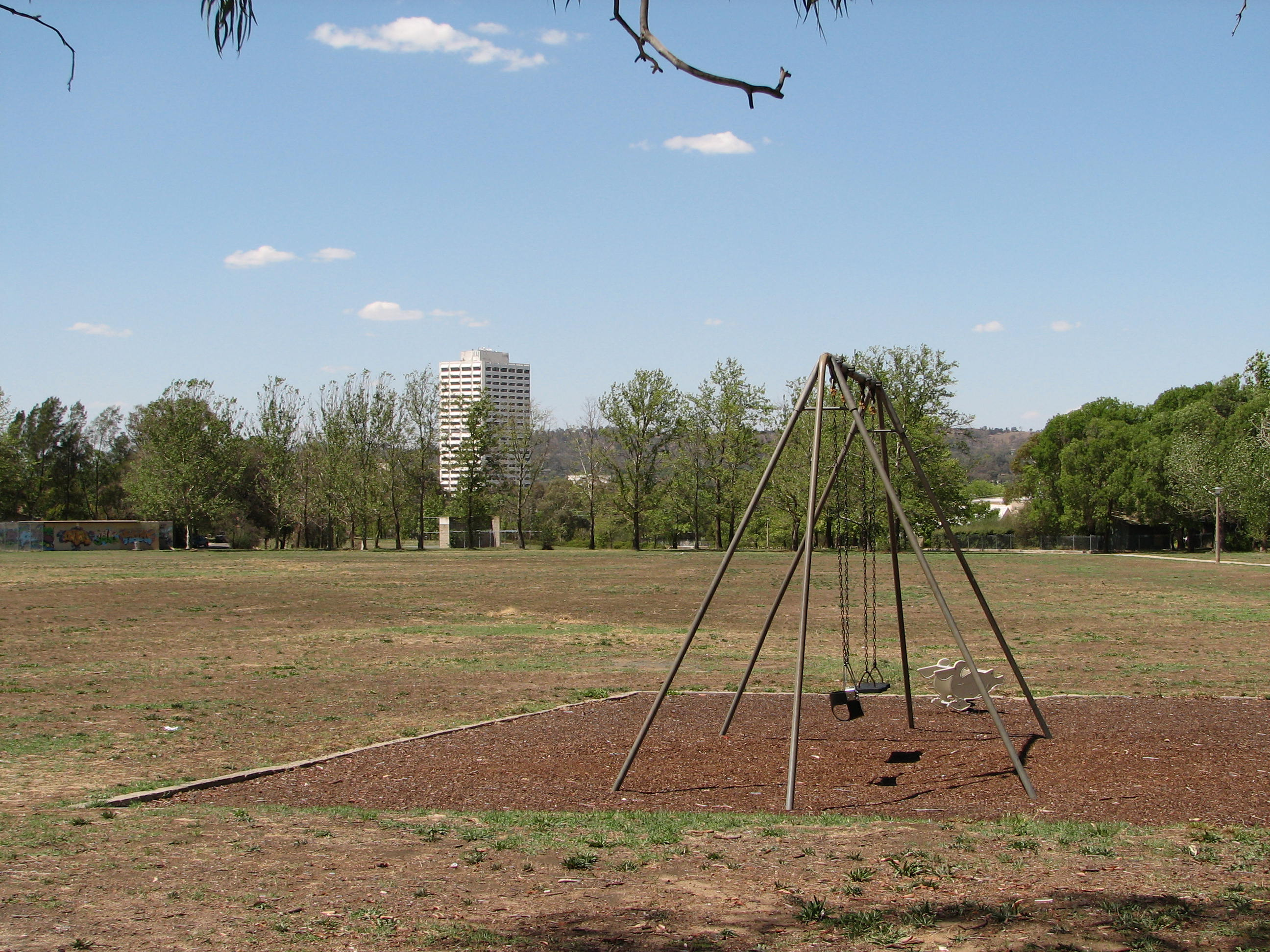
Looking from the Chifley shopping centre over the neighbourhood oval towards Phillip.

=== Shops and churches ===
Chifley has a small local shopping centre located on Eggleston Crescent. The shopping centre consists of a supermarket, a bakery, a restaurant, a podiatrist, chiropractor, and a local liquor store. Chifley has two churches both of which are located at Maclaurin Crescent, known as the Calvary Chapel and the Society of Saint Pius X Misson. https://sspx.com.au/en/community/priories

=== Recreation ===
Local playground, outdoor fitness equipment and a basketball half court are located there, a graffiti wall, and the Chifley Neighbourhood Oval. There are public BBQs at the playground.

=== Education ===
A small preschool is located in the suburb. The suburb once had a primary school originally named as Chifley Primary School, which opened in 1966. The school closed in 1989 and was renamed Melrose Primary School, until its closure again in 2006.

== See also ==
- Geology of the Australian Capital Territory
