= John S. Davie =

Sculptor (1862–1955)

John Samuel Davie (1862–1955) was a Scots-born sculptor and teacher in Australia, best known for his statue of Robert Burns in Canberra, reckoned by some as the finest in Australia. (Note: The statue was also praised in a website devoted to statues of Burns, but credited to "Samuel Davie", referring to his seldom-mentioned middle name.)

== History ==
Davie was born in Edinburgh, the sixth son of William and Anne Davie. He learned the art of sculpture at the Royal Scottish Academy, Edinburgh, a seven-year course, after which he worked as an assistant to John Hutchison. Around 1886 he left for Australia, arriving in Sydney, where he did some architectural carvings, then moved to Melbourne, where he found work designing for a tile company, then around 1896 began his teaching career with the Victorian Education Department.

Around 1897 he was appointed head of the Modelling and Sculpture Department at the Working Men's College, Melbourne, and he also conducted classes at Brunswick College on Sydney Road, Brunswick. 1900–1901. He retired in 1933, to be succeeded by Stanley Hammond. Around this time he was approached by a committee led by Sir James Murdoch to create the Burns statue, funded by around £10,000 in donations, mostly from New South Wales (the Burns societies in Victoria did not contribute). He set up a studio on the back lawn of his residence at Orrong Road, Elsternwick. The plaster mould of the clay model was sent to the Chiurazzi foundry in Naples, to be cast in bronze. It took him a year, and the seated bronze figure in front of a granite wall with four bas-relief panels was erected at the corner of Canberra Avenue and National Circuit, Forrest, and unveiled on 25 January 1935, the 176th anniversary of Burns' birth. It has been labelled Canberra's first public statue, and is remarkable in depicting the poet seated. Some controversy erupted on account of the verses transcribed onto the bronze plaques — some words, and the spelling of others, had been changed to make their meaning clearer to "Sassenachs".

A grand "Burns Night" dinner was held after the unveiling, when (according to newspaper reports), everyone was toasted or thanked, apart from the sculptor.

== Works ==
- His first commission was a statue of James Moorhouse, Bishop of Melbourne.
- Statue of Queen Victoria in the Botanical Gardens, Geelong.
- Burns Memorial, Canberra

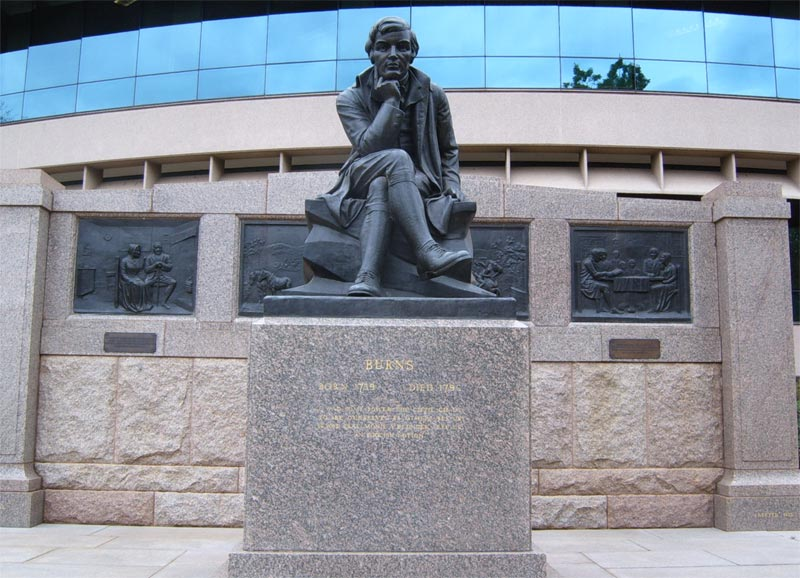

== Recognition ==
He was the subject of an Archibald Prize painting by Amalie Colquhoun.

== Family ==
Davie married Violet Lockington (c. 1872 – 14 November 1941) on 7 January 1904. They had a home at 58 Orrong Road, Elsternwick; their children included Margaret, Violet, Jean and Allan (born 27 December 1910)

Davie had a brother in Australia, Graham Davie (c. 1864 – February 1916), a traveller for Alex Cowan & Sons Ltd.

Three of their nephews were killed in WWI: Allan Davie (with the Royal Scots regiment) on 29 October 1916; Graham Davie (Seaforth Highlanders) on 18 November 1916; and John Davie (also Royal Scots) on 6 December 1916. It is likely they were sons of James Davie (c. 1854 – 29 November 1946), who died in Sydney.
