= Hughes, Australian Capital Territory =

Suburb in Canberra, Australia; postcode 2605

Hughes
- Suburb
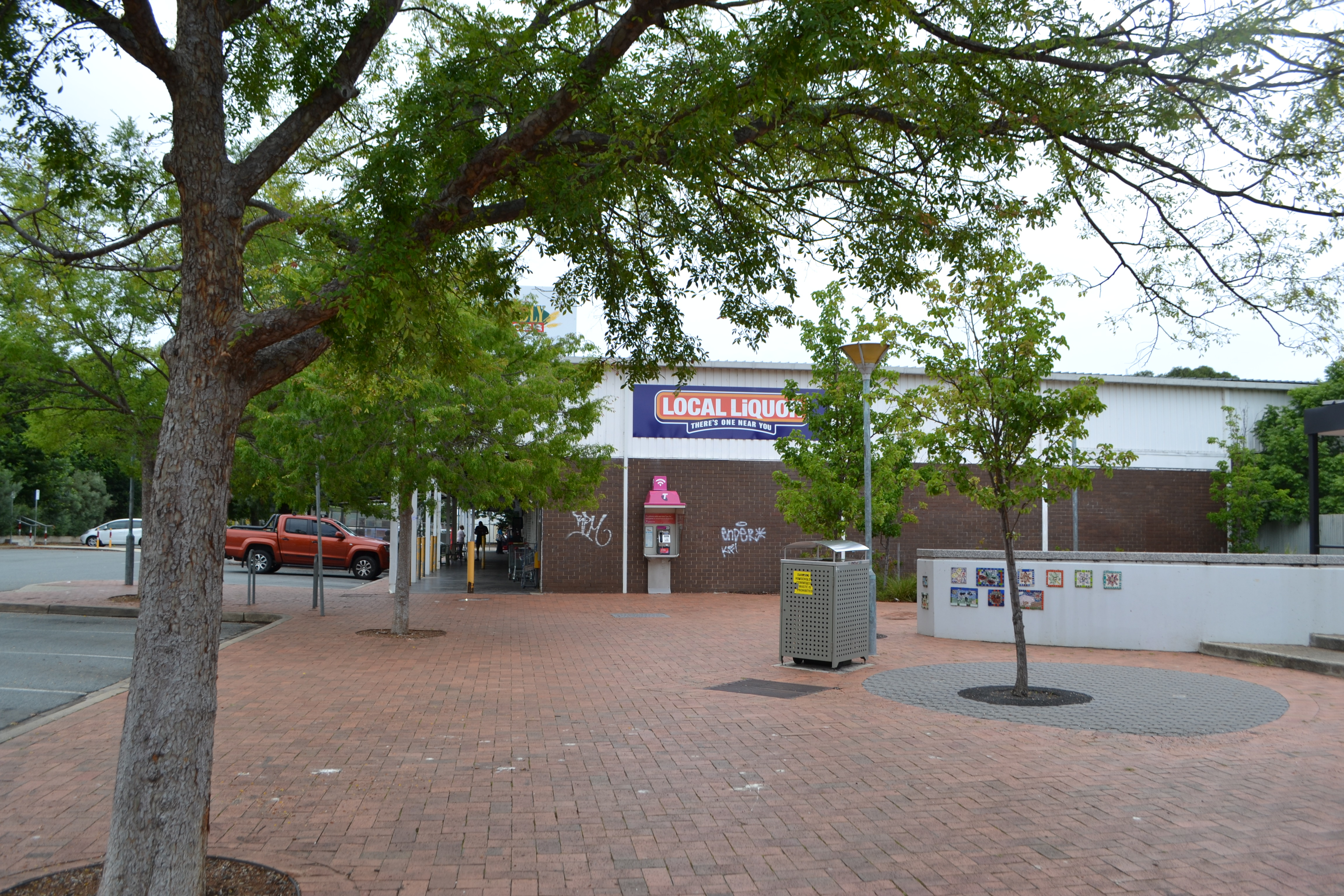
- Hughes local shops

- Coordinates: 35.333°S 149.094°E
- Country: Australia
- State: Australian Capital Territory
- City: Canberra
- District: Woden Valley
- Location: 8 km (5.0 mi) SSW of Canberra CBD; 16 km (9.9 mi) W of Queanbeyan; 103 km (64 mi) SW of Goulburn; 300 km (190 mi) SW of Sydney
- Established: 1963

Government
  - Territory electorate: Murrumbidgee
  - Federal division: Canberra

Area
  - Total: 1.8 km^{2} (0.69 sq mi)
- Elevation: 592 m (1,942 ft)

Population
  - Total: 3,210 (2021 census)
  - Density: 1,780/km^{2} (4,620/sq mi)
- Postcode: 2605
Suburbs around Hughes
Curtin	Deakin	Deakin
Curtin	Hughes	Red Hill
Phillip	Garran	Garran

Hughes is a suburb in the Canberra, Australia district of Woden. The area of the suburb is 1.81 km^{2}.

== History ==
Hughes is named after The Right Honourable William Morris "Billy" Hughes, the seventh Prime Minister of Australia from 1915 to 1923. Streets in the suburb are named with the theme of World War I armed services personnel and contemporaries of William Hughes. The suburb was gazetted on 20 September 1962, with a population of nine. Residential construction began in 1963, and by 1974 Hughes had a population of 4050.

== Geography ==
Hughes adjoins the suburbs of Deakin, Garran, Phillip and Curtin. It is bounded by Carruthers Street to the North, Yarra Glen and Yamba Drive to the west, and the Red Hill area of Canberra Nature Park to the east and south.

=== Geology ===
Hughes has several different kinds of rock from the Silurian period. Shale from the Yarralumla Formation is in the south west. Cream coloured rhyolite from the Mount Painter Volcanics is found in the north west. Dark purple rhyodacite from the Deakin Volcanics is found north of Hughes. In the south east tuff forms a layer on top of the Mount Painter Volcanics. An inactive north west – south east trending fault runs through the middle of the suburb. Movement was down on the north east side.

== Demographics ==
At the 2021 census, Hughes had a population of 3,210 people.

== Suburb amenities ==
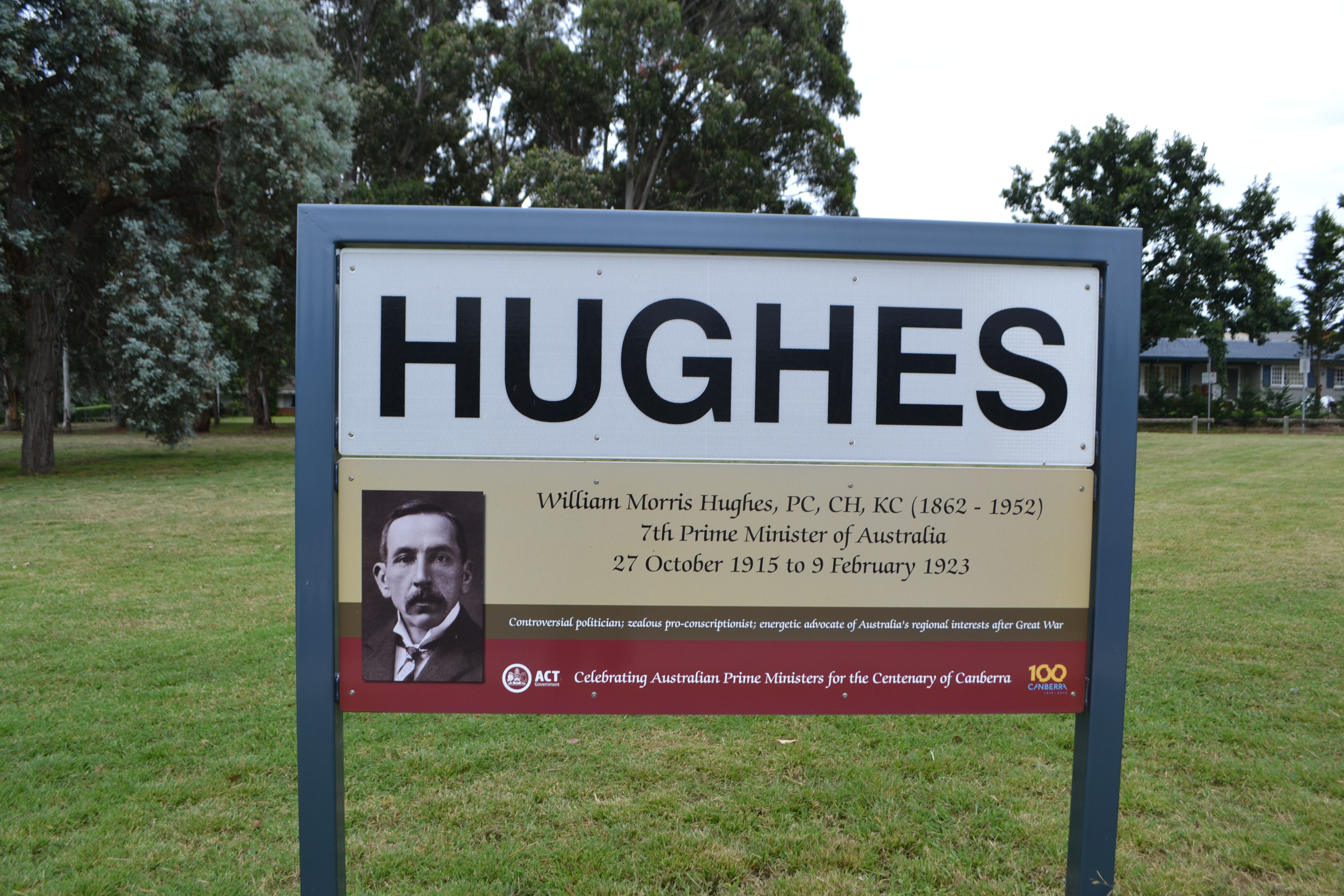
Sign marking the border of Hughes. Contains information about William Hughes.

=== Shopping ===
A small shopping centre consists of a take-away restaurant, chemist/sub-newsagency, bakery/cafe, supermarket, post office, dry cleaner, hairdresser, real estate agent, and service station and mechanical workshop.

=== Recreation ===
Sporting facilities are North Woden Tennis club and Clarrie Hermes Park (Hughes Oval), as well as three local area playgrounds.

Walking trails commence in the north-east of the suburb which run to the north of Federal Golf Course through to Red Hill Nature Reserve. Parts of the suburb have views over the Woden valley and the Woden town centre to the northern reaches of the Brindabellas.

=== Education ===
Located in the suburb are Hughes primary school and Hughes pre-school.

=== Religion ===
There are three churches in Hughes: Jehovah's Witnesses, Canberra Christadelphians and the Baptist Church

=== Other ===
St Andrews village is a retirement village, that was controversially built next to Yarra Glen, the highway bounding the west side of the suburb.
