= Fairbairn =

Origin
- Derivation: Metathesis of Freburn
- Meaning: "a handsome child"
- Region of origin: Scotland

Other names
- Variant form: Fairchild

Fairbairn is a surname of Scottish origin which means "a handsome child." It is possibly derived from a metathesis of the surname Freburn.

Notable people with the surname include:

- Andrew Fairbairn (disambiguation), several people
- Bill Fairbairn (born 1947), Canadian ice hockey player
- Bruce Fairbairn (1949–1999), Canadian musician, songwriter and producer
- Carolyn Fairbairn, British business and television executive
- Charles Fairbairn, Canadian politician, member for Victoria South (1890–1896)
- David Fairbairn (politician) (1917–1994), Australian politician and cabinet minister
- David Fairbairn (artist) (born 1949), Australian painter and printmaker
- Douglas Fairbairn, co-developer of the Xerox NoteTaker, one of the first portable computers
- George Fairbairn (disambiguation), several people
- Ian Fairbairn (rower) (1896–1968), British financier and rower
- Ian 'Walter' Fairbairn, English folk musician
- Irene Fairbairn (1899–1974), Australian Girl Guides’ leader
- Ivo Fairbairn-Crawford, British athlete who competed in 1908 Olympics. (800m & 1500m)
- James Fairbairn (1897–1940), Australian politician, Minister for Air and Civil Aviation, killed in the Canberra air disaster, 1940
- John Fairbairn (disambiguation), several people
- Joyce Fairbairn (1939–2022), Canadian senator and cabinet minister
- Kaʻimi Fairbairn (born 1994), American football player
- Nicholas Fairbairn (1933–1995), British politician
- Patrick Fairbairn (1805–1874), Scottish theologian
- Peter Fairbairn (1799–1861), Scottish engineer
- Rhea Fairbairn (1890–1953), Canadian amateur tennis player
- Richard Robert Fairbairn (1867–1941), British politician
- Robert Fairbairn (1910–1988), Scottish banker and cricketer
- Robert Edis Fairbairn (1879–1953), Canadian pacifist
- Ronald Fairbairn (William Ronald Dodds Fairbairn, 1889–1964), British psychoanalyst, father of Nicholas Fairbairn
- Steve Fairbairn (1862–1938), Australian-born rowing coach active in Cambridge and London
- Sydney Fairbairn MC (1892–1943), English cricketer and British Army officer
- Thomas Fairbairn, 2nd Baronet (1823–1891), English industrialist and art collector
- Thomas McCulloch Fairbairn (politician) (1840–1874), Canadian politician
- Thomas McCulloch Fairbairn (1840-1874), Canadian lawyer and politician
- William Fairbairn (Sir William Fairbairn, 1st Baronet of Ardwick, 1789–1874), Scottish engineer
- William E. Fairbairn (1885–1960), British soldier, police officer, and WWII commando trainer

== See also ==
- Fairburn (disambiguation)
