= Fairburn =

Fairburn may refer to:

== Places ==
New Zealand

- Fairburn, Kaitaia, New Zealand

United Kingdom

- Fairburn, North Yorkshire, a village in England
- Fairburn Tower, Scottish castle

United States

- Fairburn, Georgia, a city
- Fairburn, South Dakota, a town
- Fairburn, Wisconsin, an unincorporated community

== Other ==
- LMS Fairburn 2-6-4T, a class of steam locomotive designed by Charles Fairburn built 1945-1951
- RSPB Fairburn Ings, a reserve of the Royal Society for the Protection of Birds in West Yorkshire, England

== See also ==
- Fairburn (surname)
- Fairbairn
