= Freeborn (disambiguation) =

"Freeborn" is a term associated with political agitator John Lilburne (1614–1657).

Freeborn may also refer to:

- Freeborn (Ancient Rome), a person who never been a slave in the Ancient Rome
- Free negro
- Free people of color
- Freeborn (name)
- Freeborn County, Minnesota, a county in Minnesota, United States
- Freeborn, Minnesota, a city in Freeborn County, Minnesota, United States
- Freeborn Lake, a lake in Douglas County, Minnesota, United States
