= Red Hill, Australian Capital Territory =

Suburb of Canberra, Australia

Red Hill
- Suburb
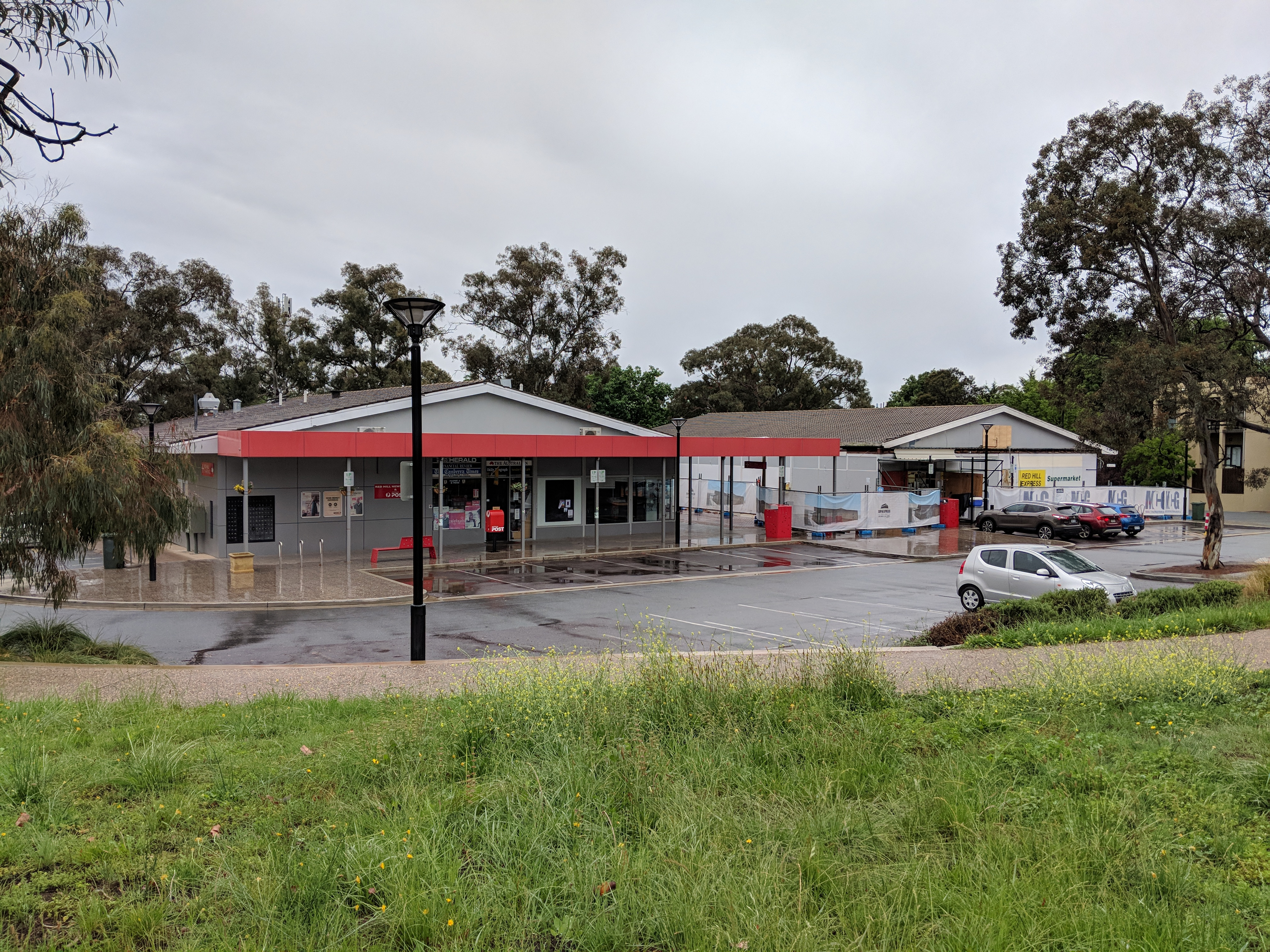
- Red Hill shops

- Coordinates: 35°19′59″S 149°07′59″E
- Country: Australia
- State: Australian Capital Territory
- City: Canberra
- District: South Canberra
- Location: 7 km (4.3 mi) S of Canberra CBD; 12 km (7.5 mi) W of Queanbeyan; 100 km (62 mi) SW of Goulburn; 297 km (185 mi) SW of Sydney
- Established: 1928

Government
  - Territory electorate: Murrumbidgee
  - Federal division: Canberra

Area
  - Total: 4.87 km^{2} (1.88 sq mi)
- Elevation: 634 m (2,080 ft)

Population
  - Total: 3,146 (SAL 2021)
- Postcode: 2603
- Gazetted: 20 September 1928
Suburbs around Red Hill
Deakin	Forrest	Griffith
Garran	Red Hill	Narrabundah
O'Malley	Symonston	Symonston

Red Hill is a suburb of Canberra, Australian Capital Territory, Australia. The suburb is named after the northernmost hill of the ridge to the west of the suburb. The ridge is a reserve and managed as part of the Canberra Nature Park. The hill is an element of the central Canberra design axis.

== History ==
The name 'Red Hill' was gazetted as a suburb name in 1928. This was the name associated with the hill since the days of the early settlers and probably suggested by the red soil in the area. Streets are named after ships and explorers. Mugga Way is named after an Aboriginal word also associated with the locality since the days of the early settlers.

The hill was once part of the Narrabundah lease held by Charles Russell. He grazed sheep but as the suburb became built up, local pet dogs worried them and killed them. He changed to cattle and finally gave up the lease in 1992.

The Red Hill Precinct or "Old Red Hill" is bounded by Mugga Way, Moresby Street, Arthur Circle, Monaro Crescent and Flinders Way. The major streets of this area were included in an outline plan for the early development of Canberra prepared by Walter Burley Griffin in 1918. Its streetscape and landscape character reflect 1920s garden city planning. It is listed by the ACT Heritage Council.

Residential land in the suburb of Red Hill was offered for sale in the first Canberra land auction conducted on 12 December 1924. By 1929, 22 houses had been built and by 1955 there were 64 houses.

Other sites in Red Hill listed by the ACT Heritage Council are:

- Calthorpes' House.
- The Royal Australian Institute of Architects Headquarters, 2a Mugga Way, which was designed by Bryce Mortlock of the Sydney firm, Ancher, Mortlock and Woolley in 1967.
- The Canberra Grammar School, which was built between 1929 and 1939 in the Inter-war Gothic style.
- 145 Mugga Way. According to the ACT Heritage Council, the house is considered to be an "excellent example of the late twentieth century Sydney Regional style of architecture by Allen Jack+Cottier (Russell Jack) who are considered to be key practitioners in the style."
- Red Hill Camp. A Ngunnawal campsite from the 1940s at the intersection of Flinders Way, Durville Crescent and Hayes Crescent.

== Suburb amenities ==
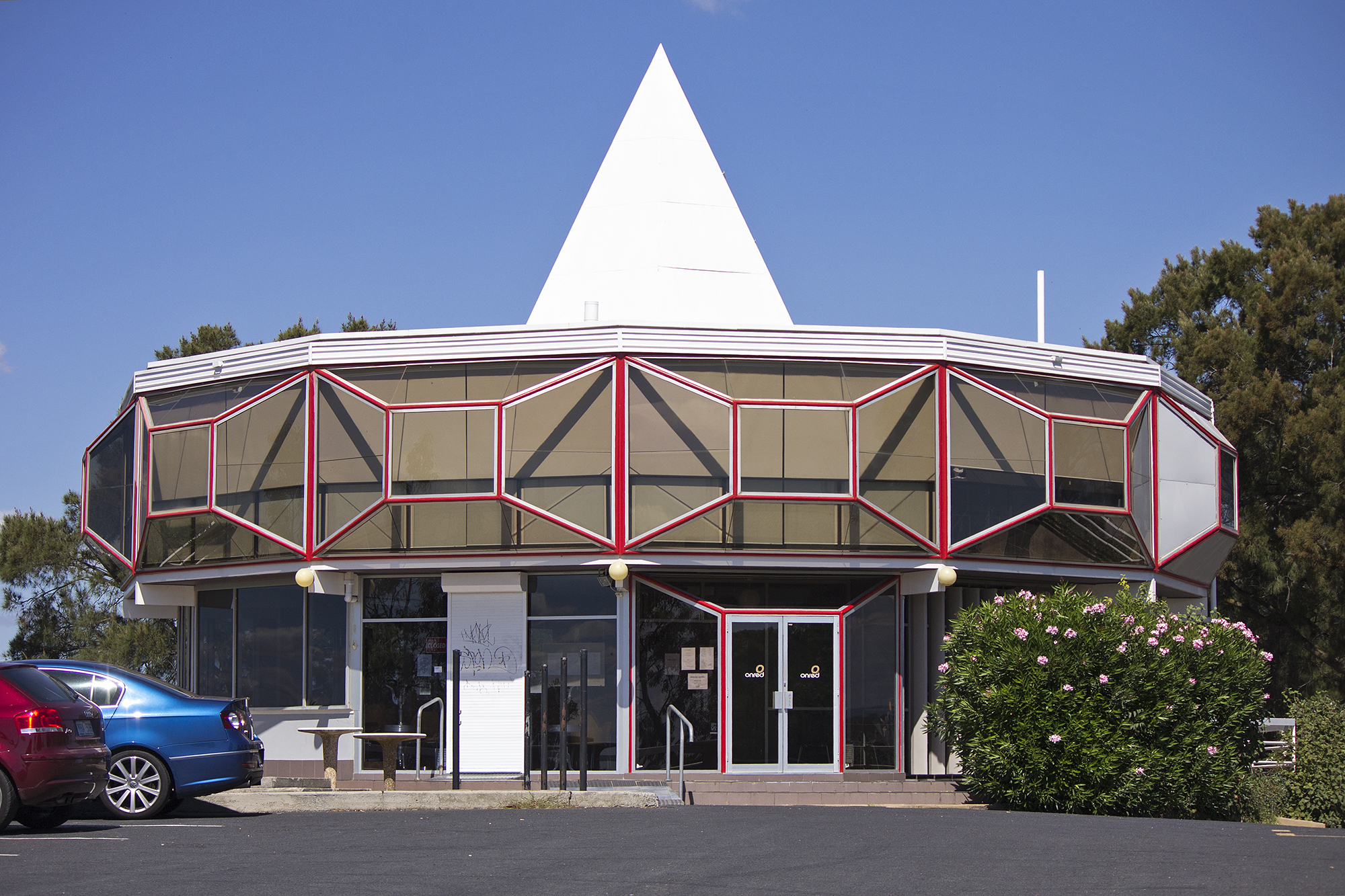
Lunetta Trattoria restaurant on Red Hill was built in 1964 and has views over Canberra

=== Canberra Nature Park: Red Hill ===
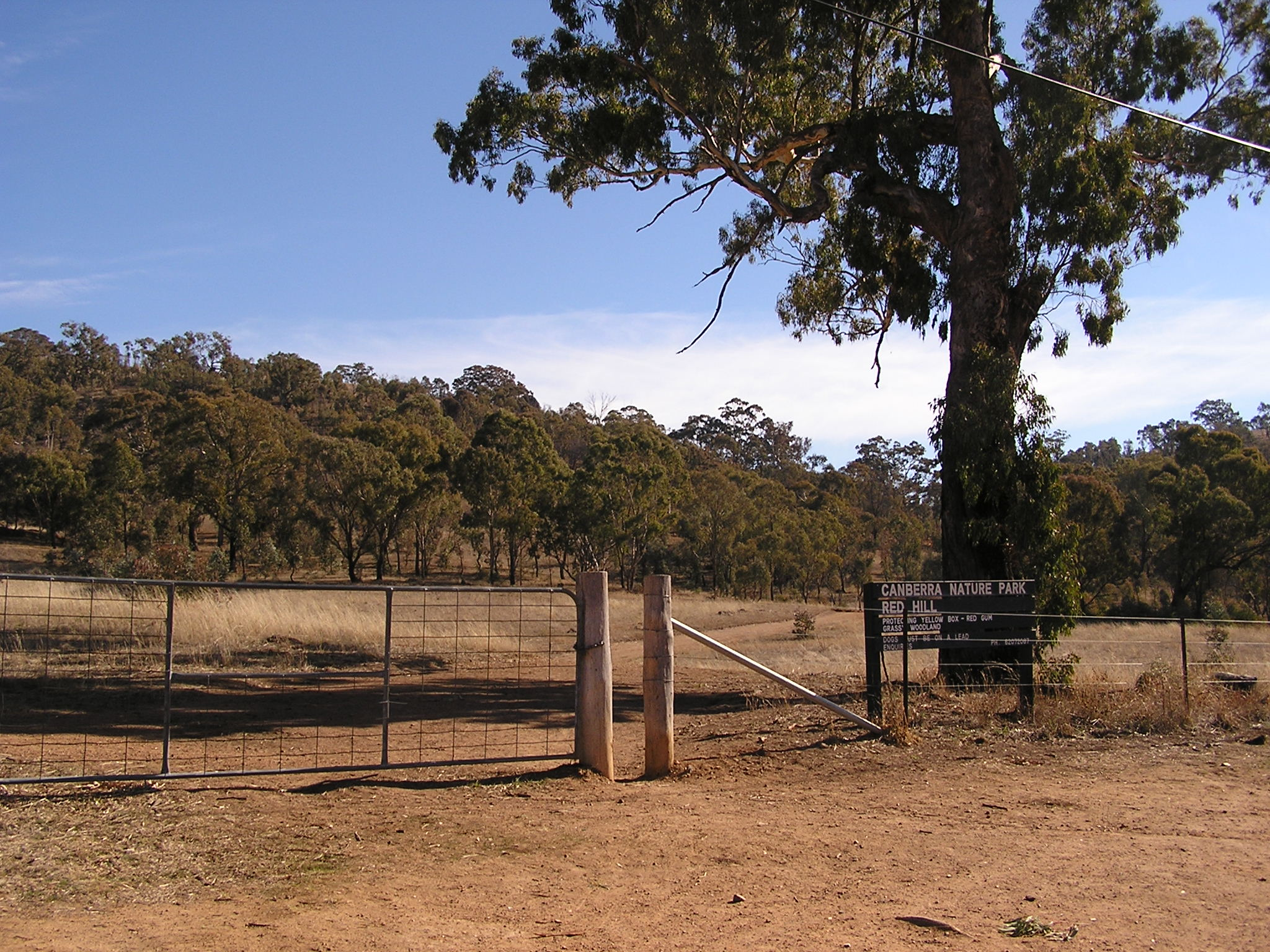
Entrance to Red Hill reserve, part of the Canberra Nature Park

Red Hill's most important recreational area is the hill itself. From the Canberra Times Letters to the Editor in May 2000 one resident said:

Most Sundays I walk on the slopes of Red Hill in bush that is not pristine, not especially beautiful, but that is there close to where I live, a bit of bush rather than town earth and rock, not bitumen. There is a variety of birds, a miscellany of trees, some of them exotics, a range of weedy but pretty flowers, no doubt snakes, and certainly kangaroos. Ironically, a month ago I saw more kangaroos (a mob of 14) on Red Hill in the centre of Canberra than I saw subsequently during the entirety of a 16-day tour of the Red Centre. This Red Hill bush it can't be called wilderness makes Canberra a better place to live for the many people who do walk there and enjoy its qualities.

=== Green spaces ===
Notable green spaces include the Lady Nelson Playground located close to the Red Hill shops, Navigators and Voyager Parks on either side of Red Hill Primary school, Golden Grove Park, and Oscar's Park, a community gathering space located near Roebuck Street.

== Education ==
Red Hill has a local public primary school and a government pre school located in the same building complex. The Red Hill School is an accredited IB World School. There is also a Catholic primary school, St Bede's Primary School, and the Canberra Grammar School, an Anglican school for boys and girls, and a French-Australian preschool.

Red Hill residents get preference for:

- Depending on the address: Red Hill Primary or Forrest Primary
- Telopea Park School (for high school)
- Narrabundah College

== Notable places ==
=== Calthorpes' House ===
Calthorpes' House at 24 Mugga Way was built in 1927 by Harry Calthorpe, stock and station agent with the firm Woodgers & Calthorpe. Designed by the architectural firm of Oakley and Parkes, the house displays many characteristics of the Spanish Mission style. The family (Harry, his wife Del and two daughters, Del and Dawn) lived together in the house throughout the Depression and Second World War, when both girls married. After Harry's death in 1950, his wife continued to live in the house, mostly alone. While friends and neighbours redecorated their houses, she never did. After her death in 1979, it was recognised that an opportunity existed to preserve a house that related to Canberra's early years in staggering completeness, and the Australian Commonwealth Government bought the house, its garden and the house's contents from the two daughters in 1984.

The Australian Institute of Architects in its register of significant 20th-century architecture says the building is a rare, relatively unchanged example of a 1920s Australian home. Noting that it encapsulates family life of the time, it also points to the interior design and clinical appearance of the kitchen and bathroom, which "heralded the new social era".

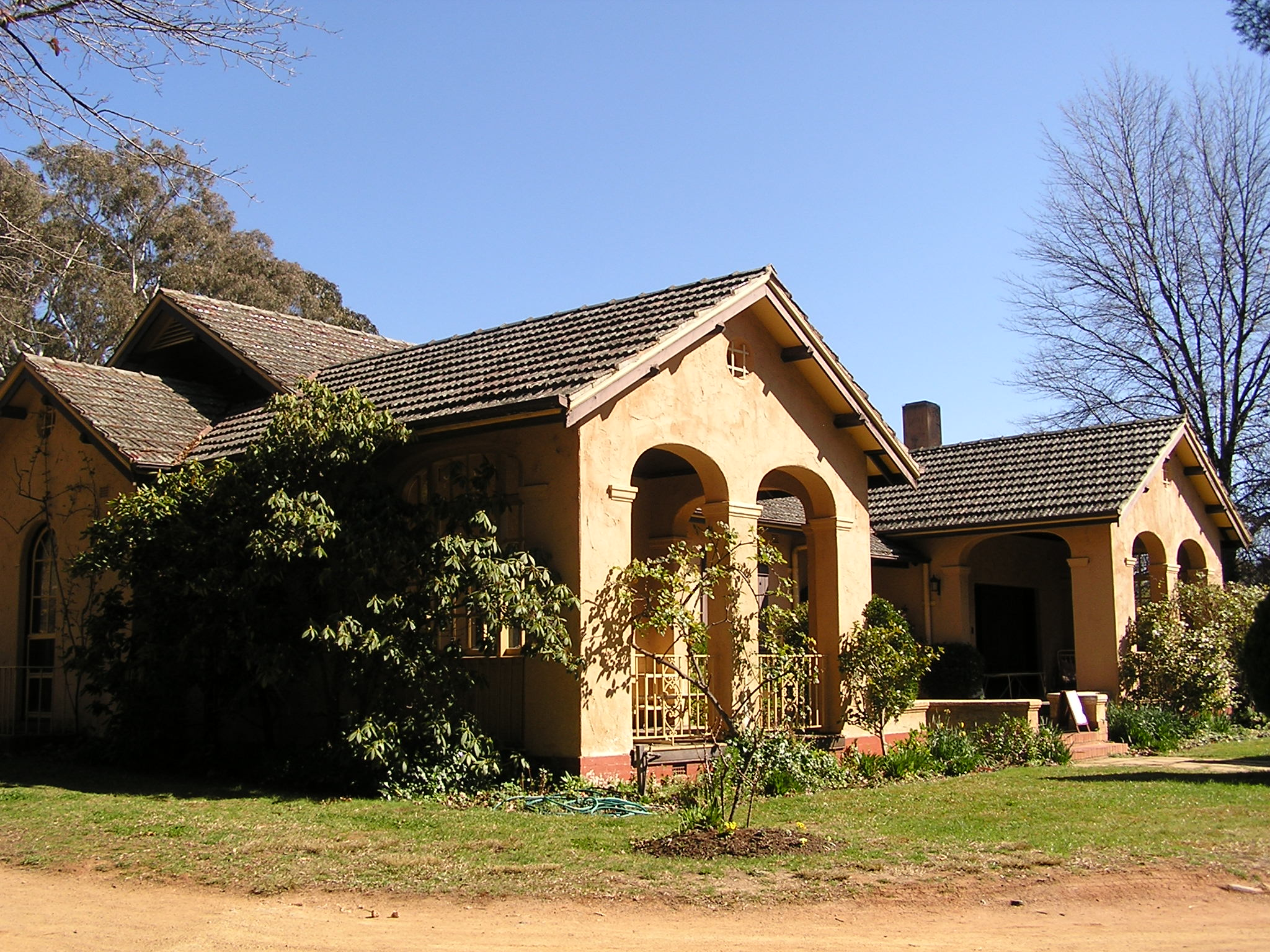
House from front garden

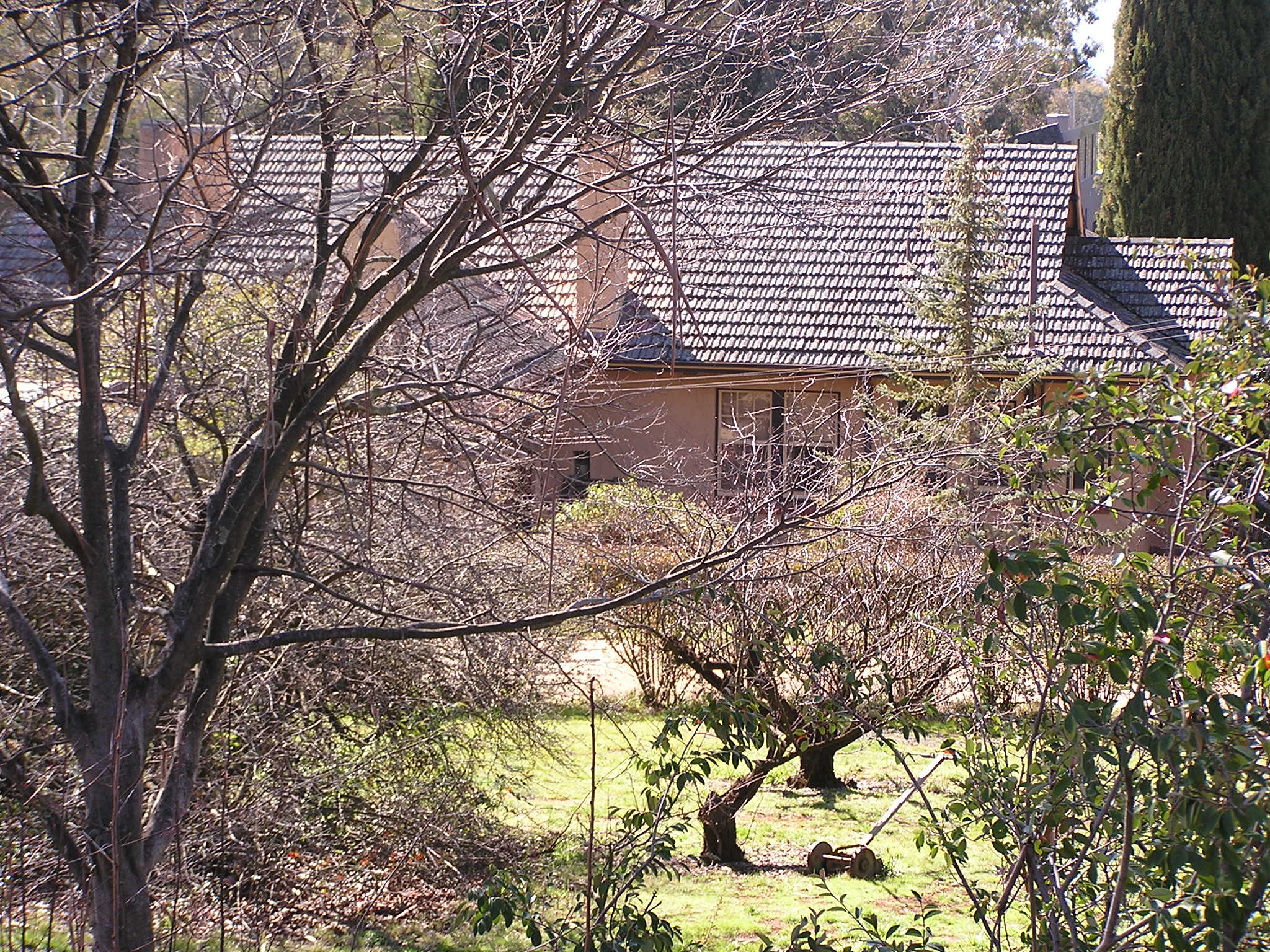
Back garden, including orchard

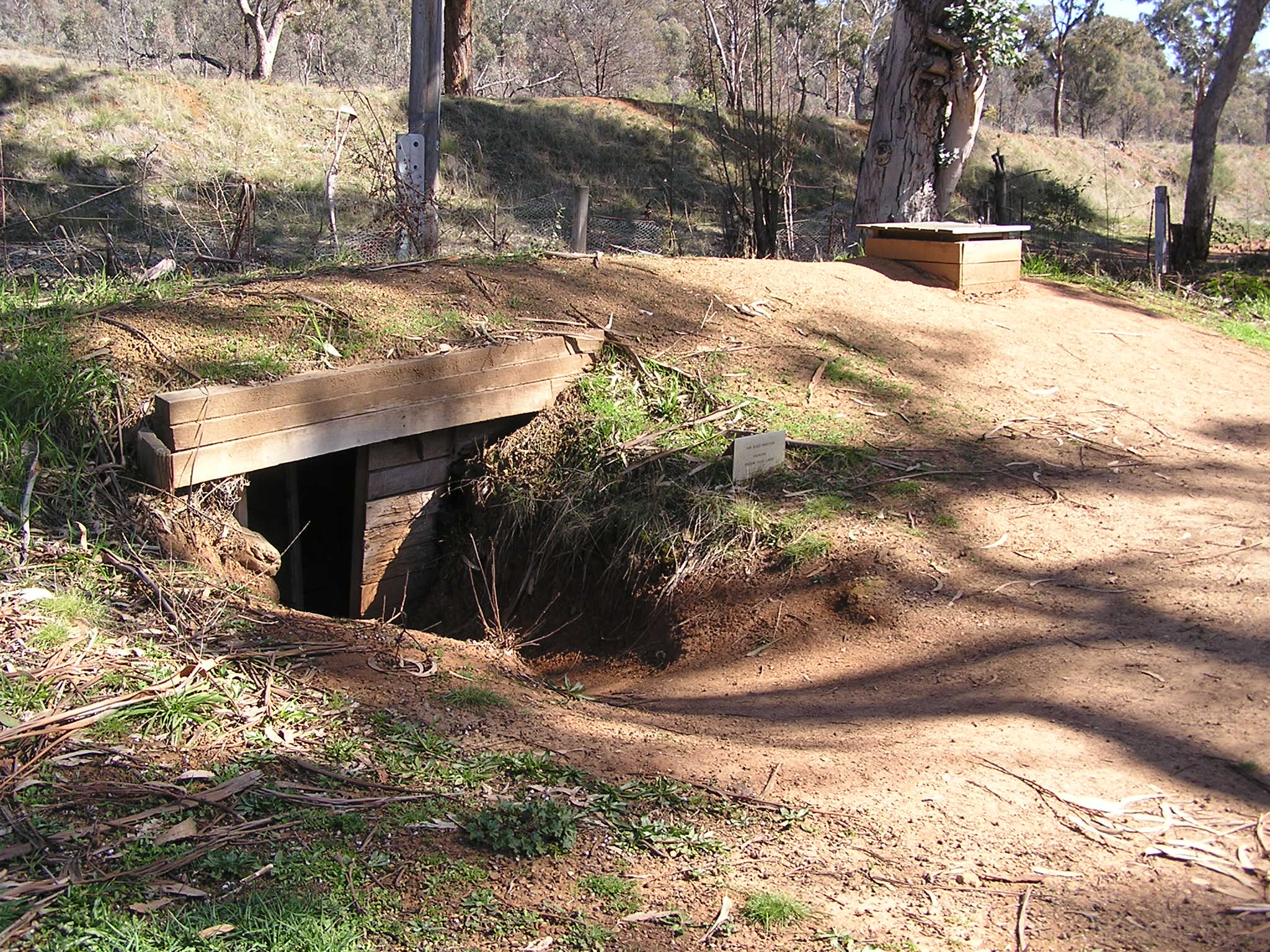
World War II air raid shelter in back garden

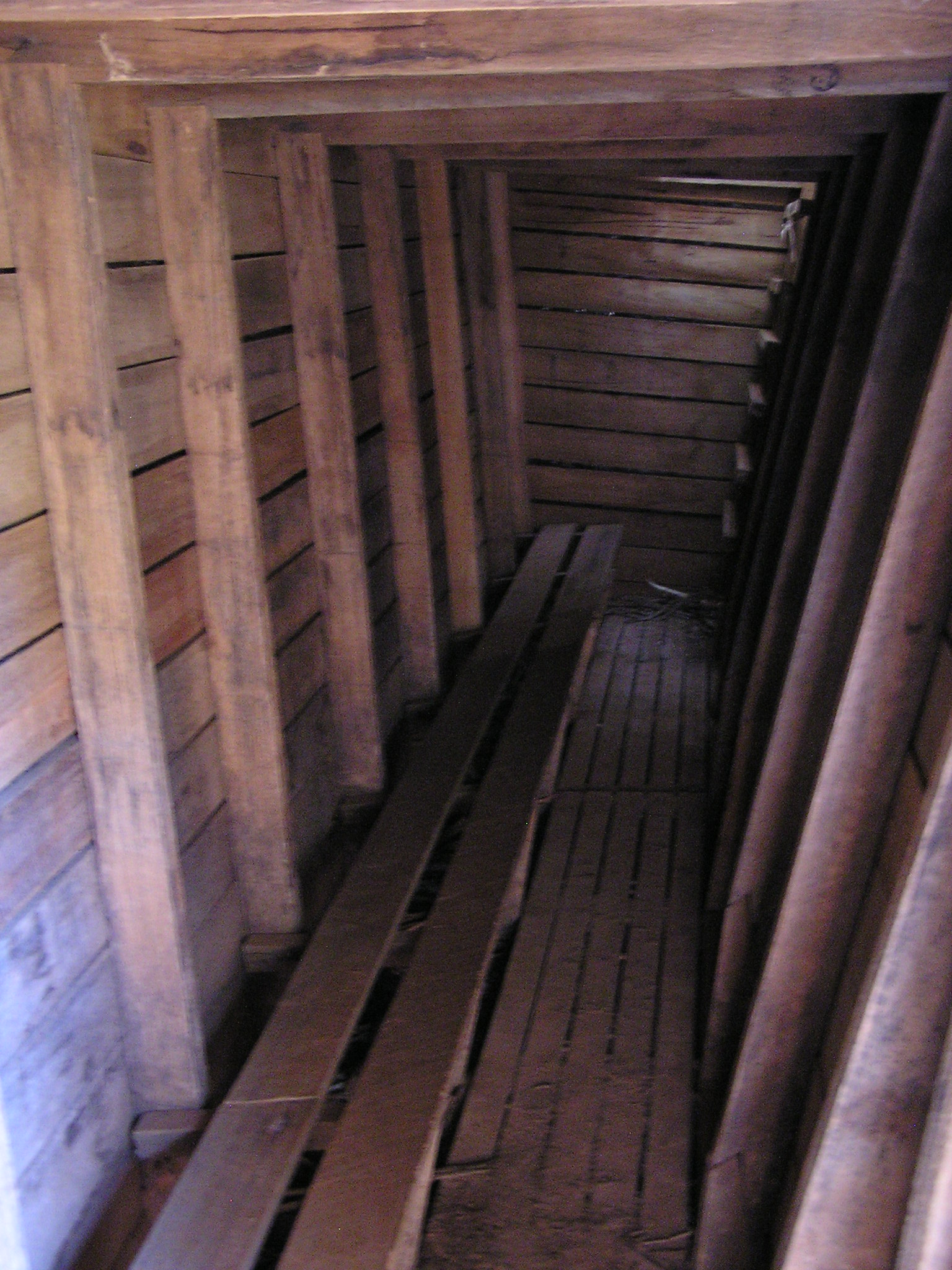
Air raid shelter interior

=== Boxford ===
A suburban garden named Boxford designed by Polly Park was divided into six separate sections, each reflecting the garden history and culture of a different part of the world. One of the gardens is in the Japanese style; another features a fountain inspired by chapel of Oscar Niemeyer in garden derived from the ideas of Burle Marx a Brazilian garden designer. The garden has been listed on the ACT Heritage Register, and it was featured in Burke's Backyard.

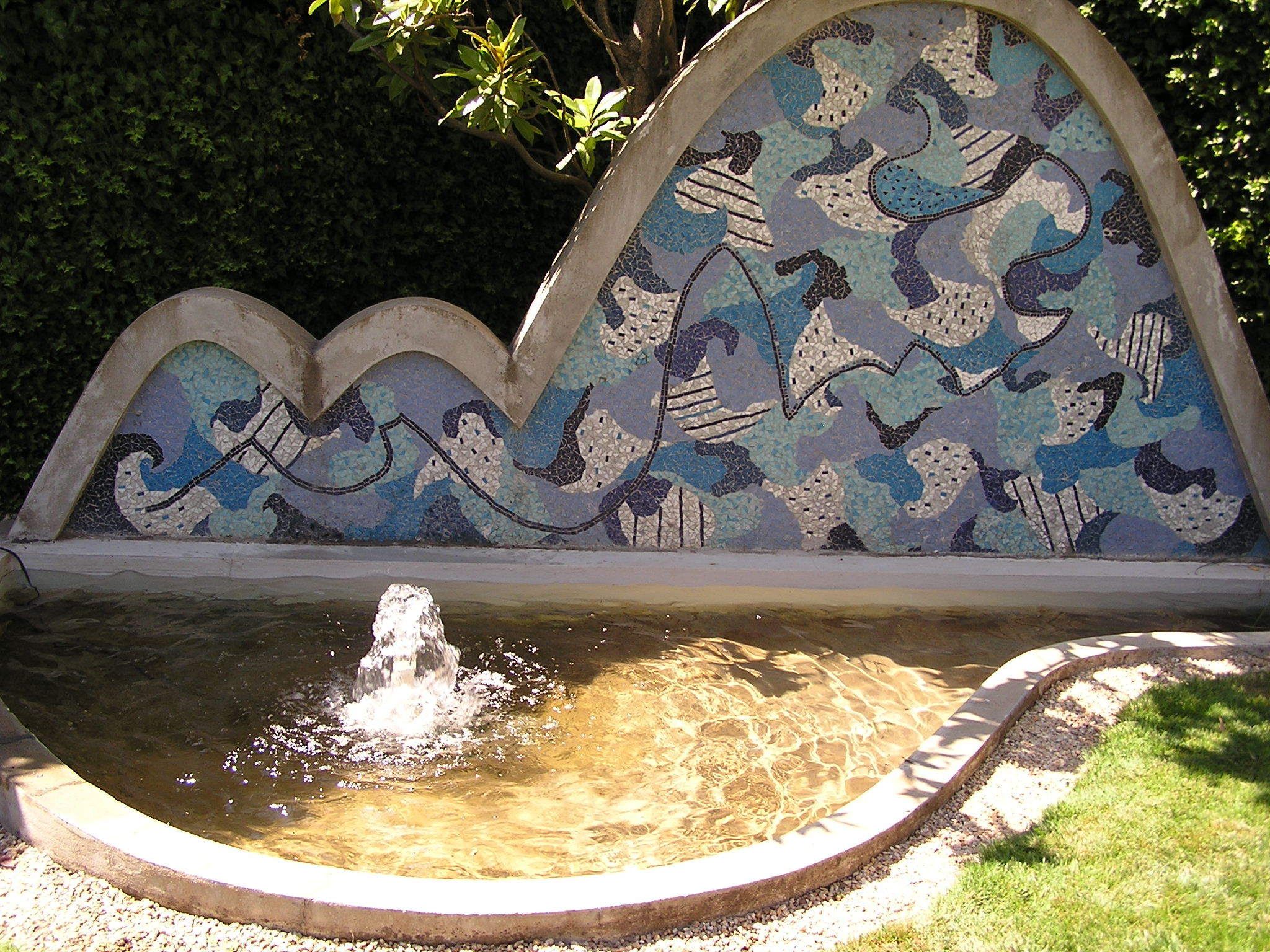
Fountain

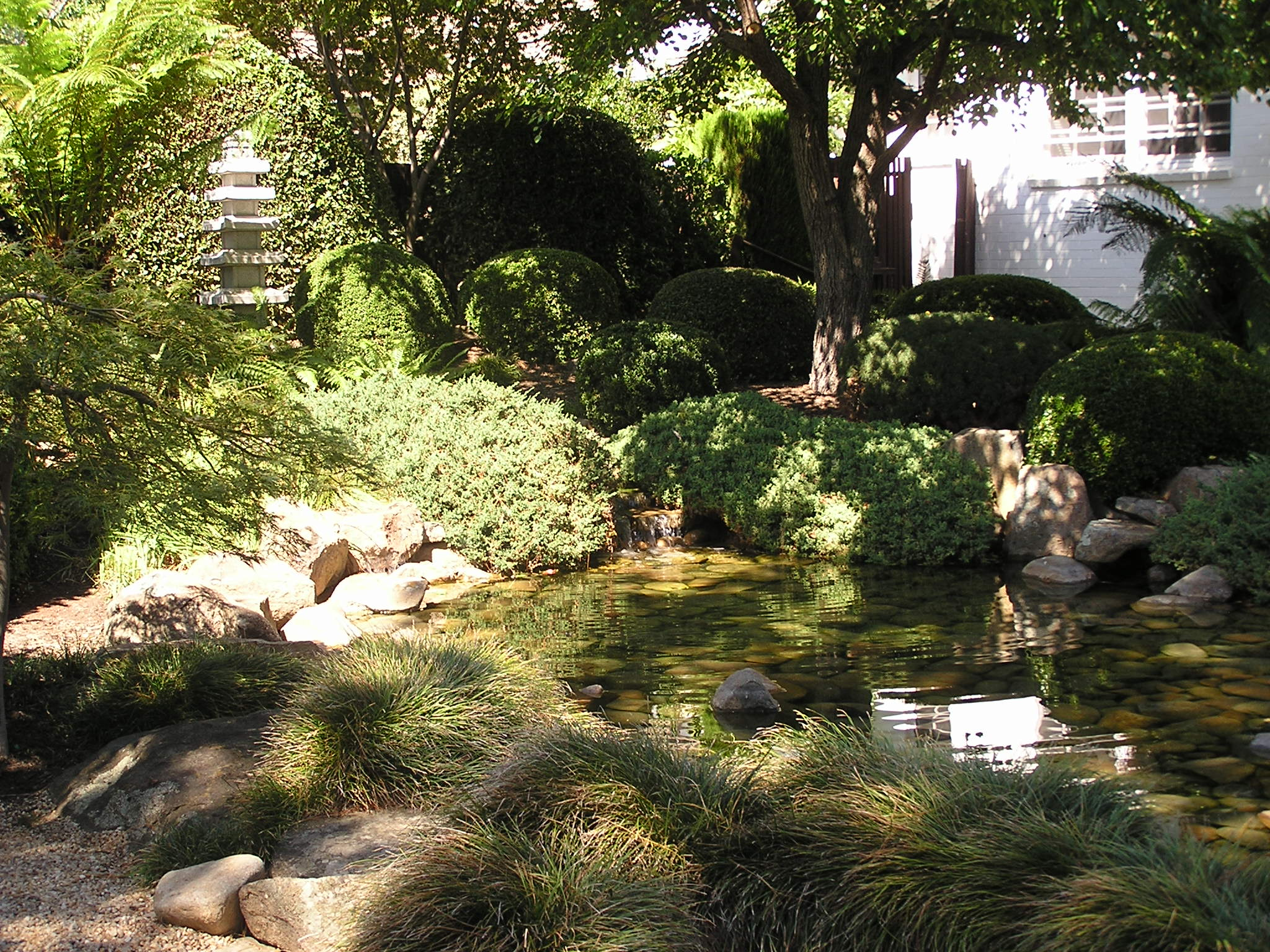
The Japanese garden

Despite its heritage listing the garden was destroyed by new owners.

== Major roads ==
The main access to the suburb from the south is from Hindmarsh Drive onto either Mugga Way or Dalrymple Street. The main roads through the suburb are La Perouse Street, Flinders Way and Monaro Crescent. The suburb's roads are named after ships and explorers.

== Demographics ==
The first families moved to the suburb of Red Hill in 1927 and by 1933 the suburb had a population of 132 people. Its population peaked in 1971 with 4,100 residents. At the 2021 census, Red Hill had a population of 3,146, little changed from its population of 3,170 in 2016, 3,249 in 2011 and 3,143 in 2006 and 3,062 in 2001. The population number has changed little over the last 30 years: in 2001 there were 16 fewer people than in 1996; 32 more people than in 1991.

The median age was 42 years; an increase over the median age of 39 recorded in the 2006 census and 37 years recorded in both the 1996 and 1991 censuses.

The mean household size was 2.8 persons.

In the 2021 census, 79.1% of dwellings were separate houses, 7.3% were semi detached, row or terrace houses and townhouses and 13.4% were flats, units or apartments.

Of all occupied private dwellings in the 2021 census, 39.2% were fully owned, 35.8% were being purchased and 21.8% were being rented.

== Governance ==
2025 federal election
Labor	48.94%
Liberal	23.35%
Greens	13.70%
Independent	11.88%
2024 ACT election
Liberal	43.1%
Labor	29.1%
Fiona Carrick Independent	11.7%
Greens	7.6%

Red Hill is located within the federal electorate of Canberra, which is currently represented by Alicia Payne in the House of Representatives. In the ACT Legislative Assembly, Red Hill is part of the electorate of Murrumbidgee, which elects five members on the basis of proportional representation, currently two Labor, two Liberals and one independent. Polling place statistics are shown to the right for the Red Hill polling place at Red Hill School in the 2022 federal and 2024 ACT elections.

== Geography ==
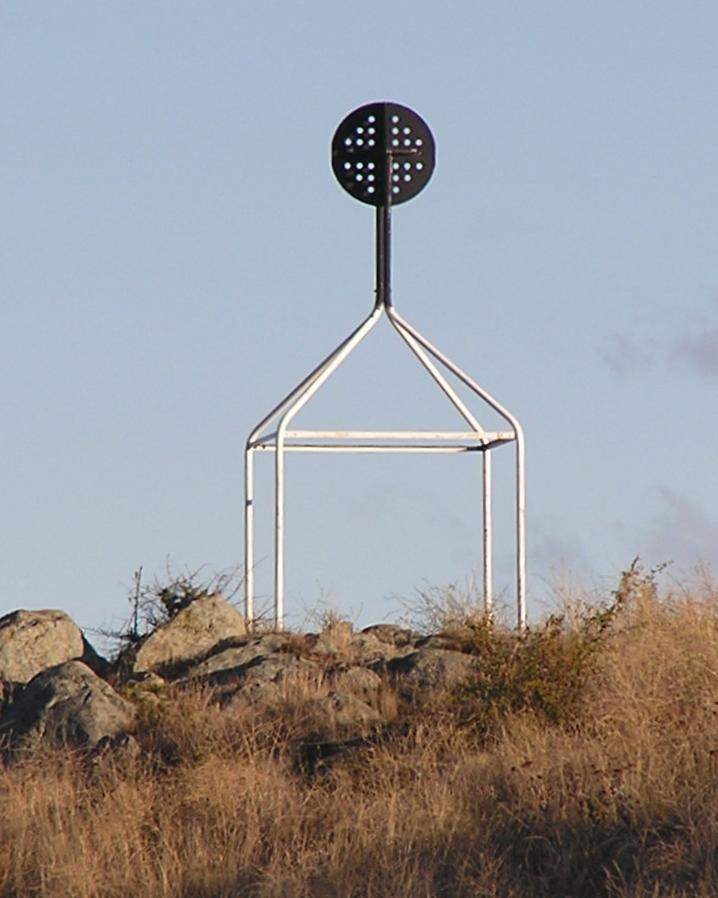
Davidson Trig Point on Red Hill

The Red Hill ridge forms the south-west boundary of the suburb. The ridge separates the central Canberra valley from Woden Valley. The northernmost peak is Red Hill, the Davidson Trig is on the middle point, and Mount Mugga is on the southernmost point of the ridge across Hindmarsh Drive.

The suburb occupies 4.87 km² and has a population density of 634/km².

== Geology ==
The Red Hill ridge is said by geologists to be an "erosion residual" resulting from metamorphism of sedimentary rock. The Yarralumla Formation sediments were toughened by thermal metamorphism from a small granite intrusion to the south thereby providing the resistant core of the ridge. The granite is deeply weathered and does not outcrop but is evident by the smooth slopes and deep red soils on the lower slopes to the north-west by the road to the Federal Golf Course. This intrusion is known as Federal Golf Course Tonalite. It is dated at 417±8 Mya. It is completely crystalline with mineral content of plagioclase, hornblende, biotite and interstitial quartz and no potash feldspar.

The type of red soil is known as terra rossa.

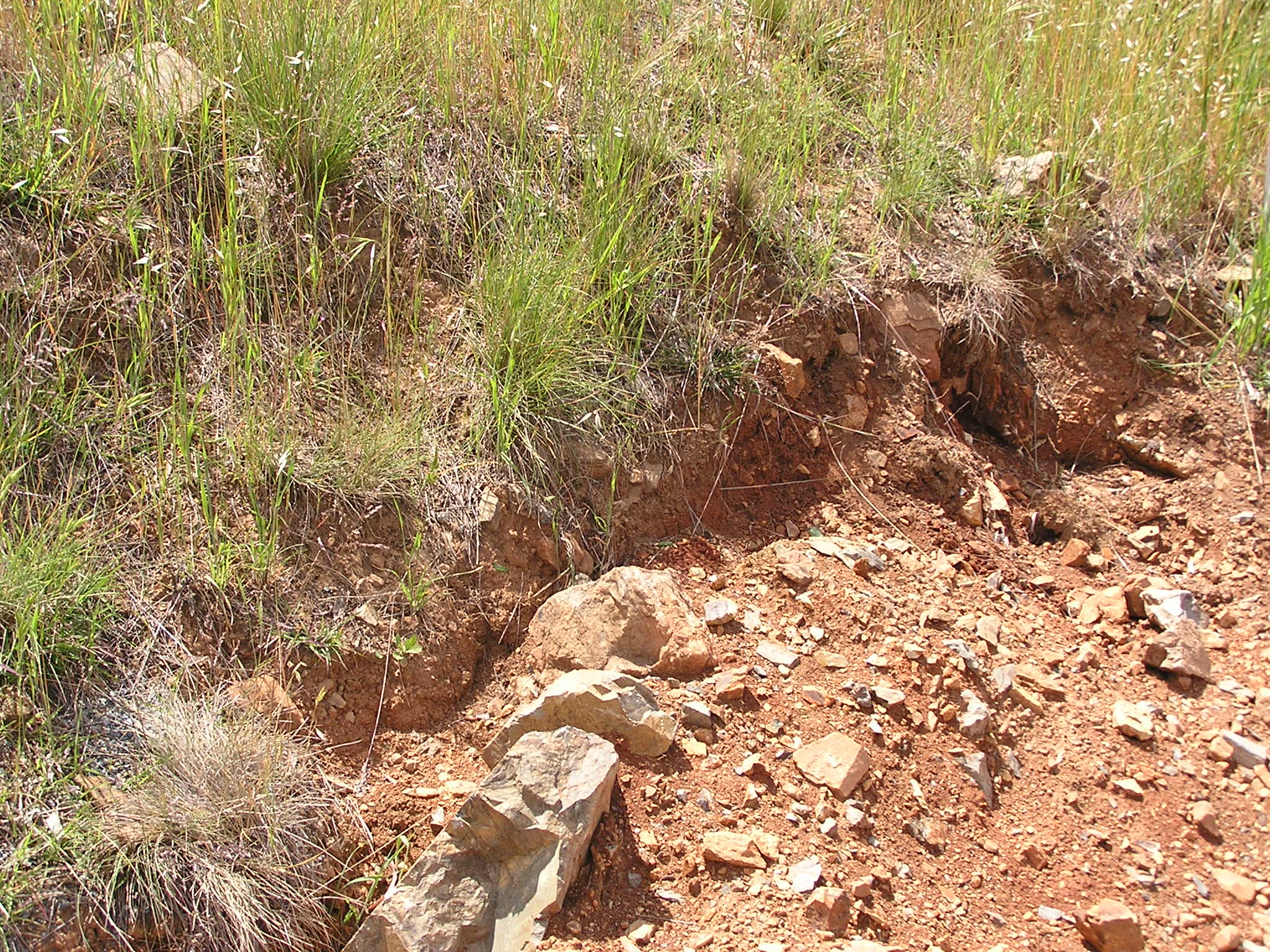
Recently exposed soil. Red Hill gained the name from the colour of its soil.

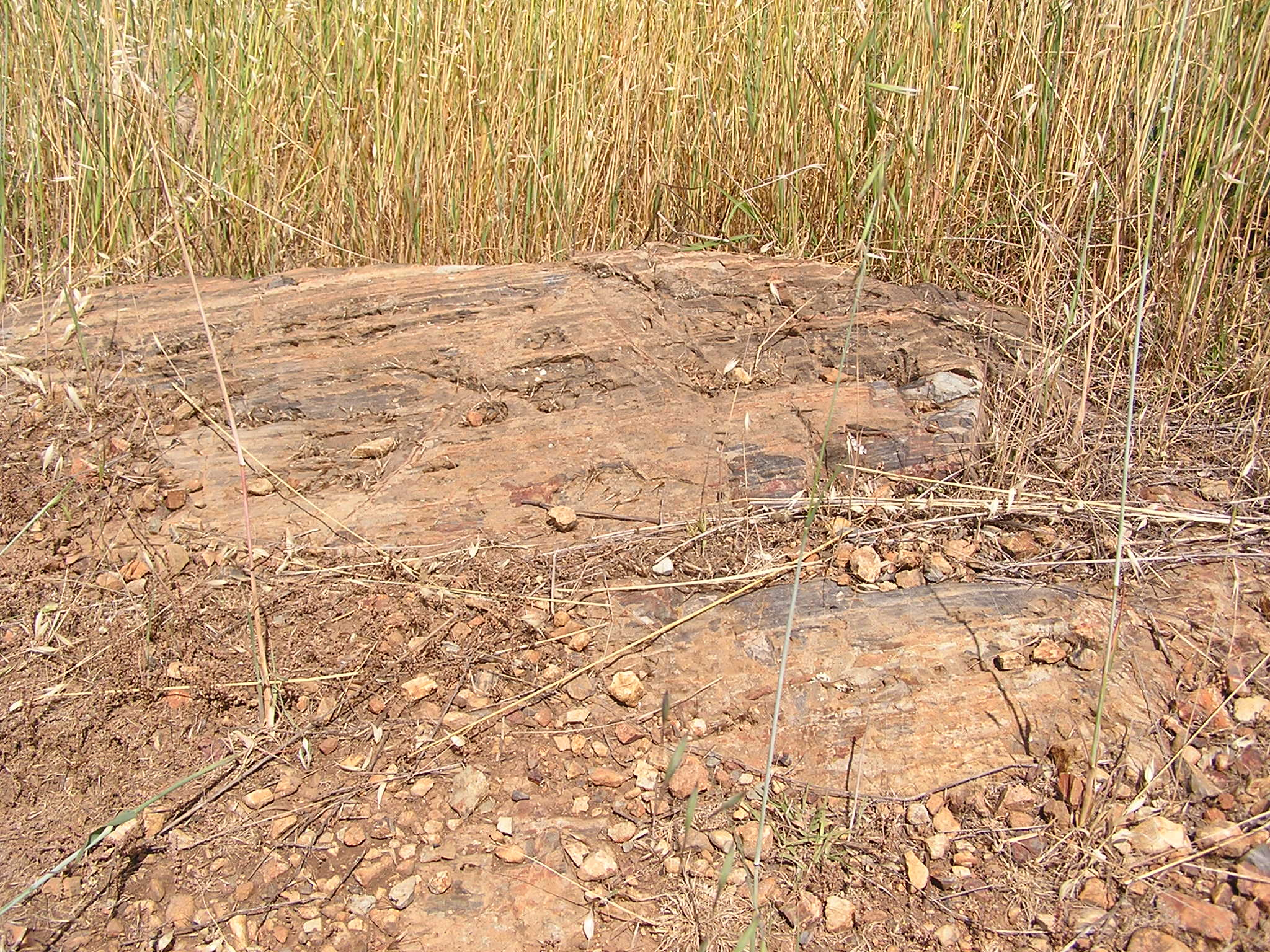
This rock is from a still-standing metamorphic ridge

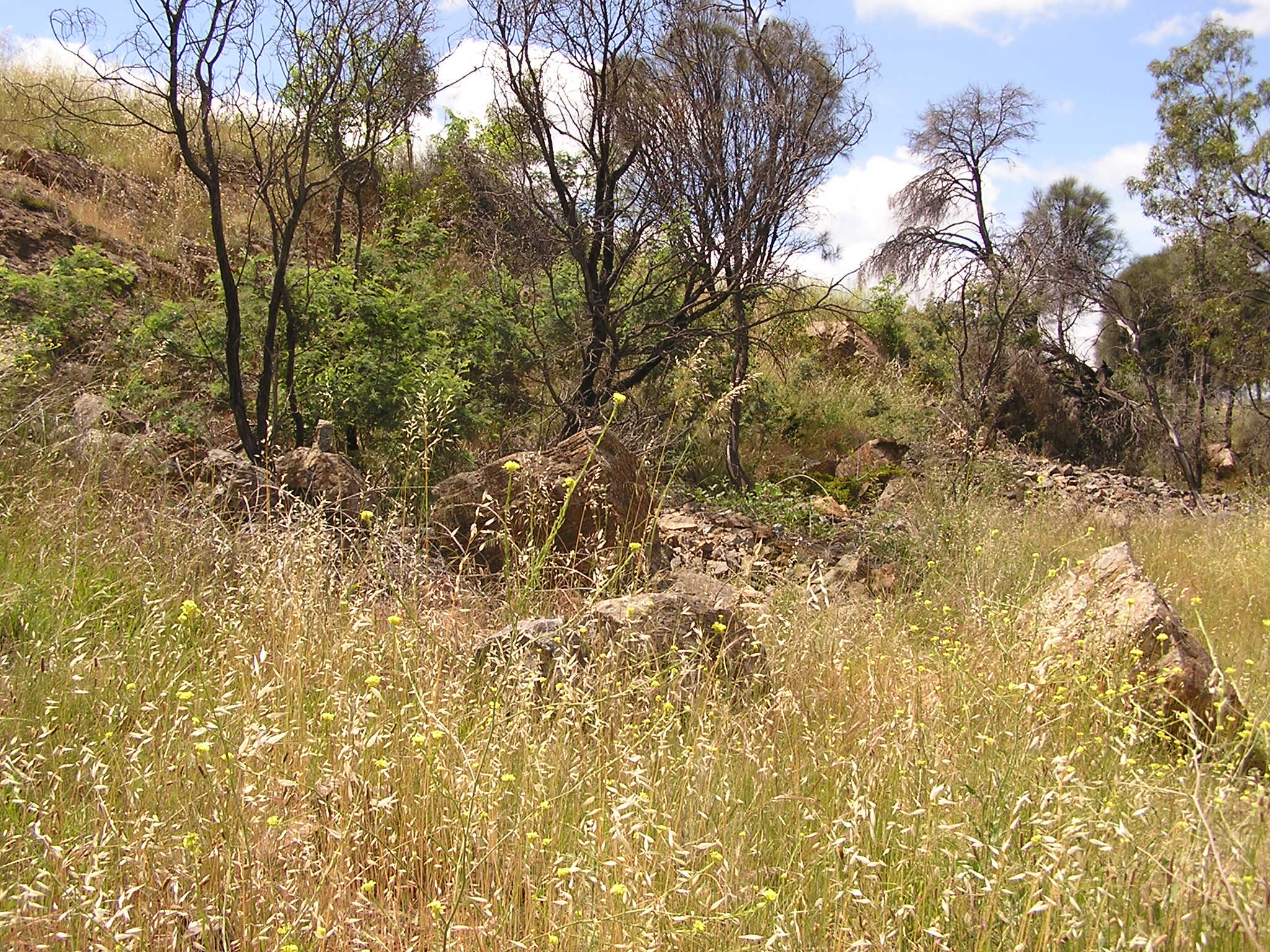
Small disused quarry on west side of the ridge

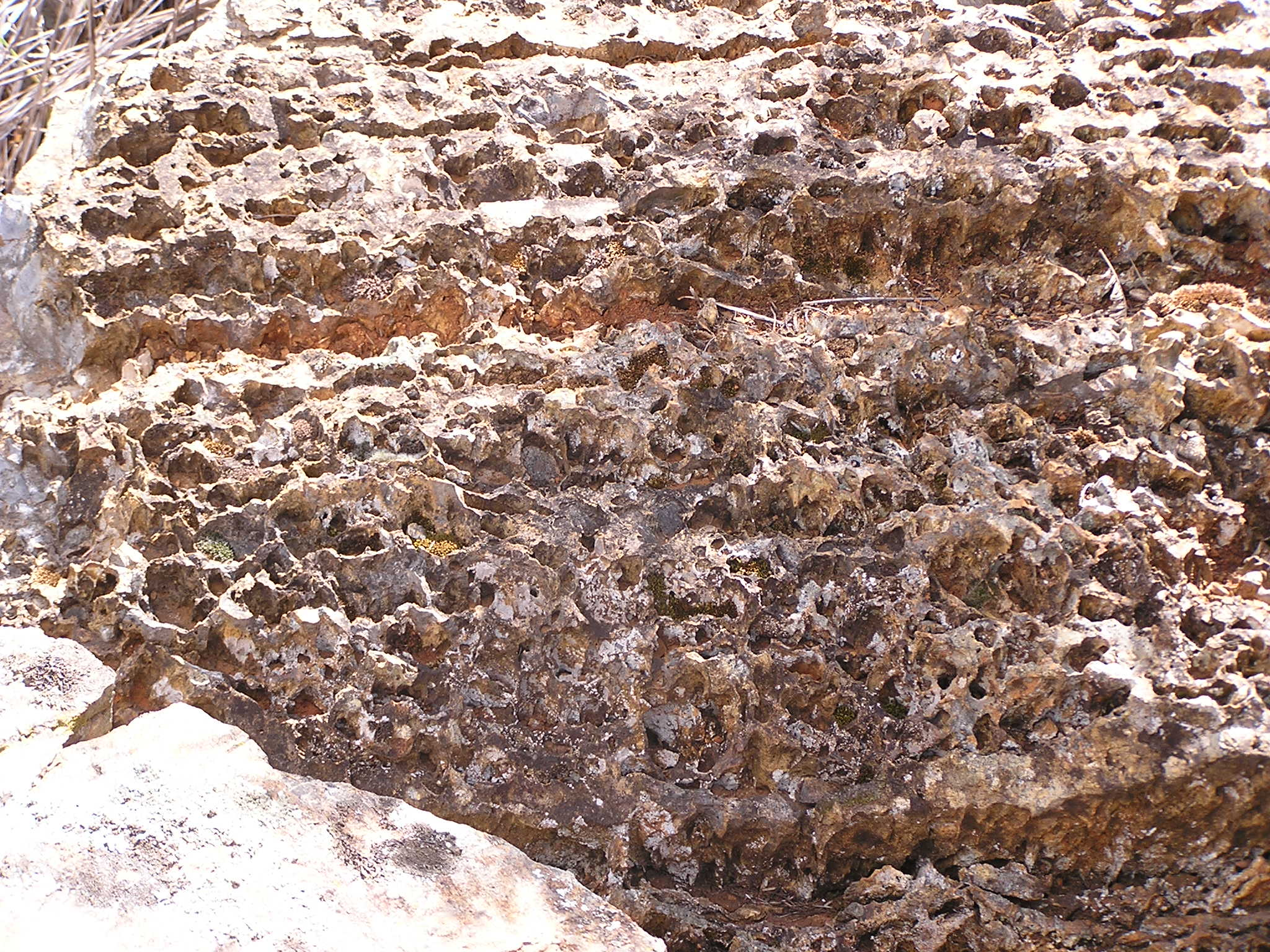
Exposed rock in disused small quarry, showing interesting weathering features

=== Rock location summary ===
Mount Painter Volcanics dark grey to green grey dacitic tuff is found in all except the west. This includes most of the built up area. Yarralumla formation outcrops on Red Hill down to Mugga Way. The Federal Golf Course hanging off the west side of Red Hill also counts as part of the suburb. It has a Silurian tonalite intrusion under the whole course referred to as granite above.

== Red Hill Lookout ==
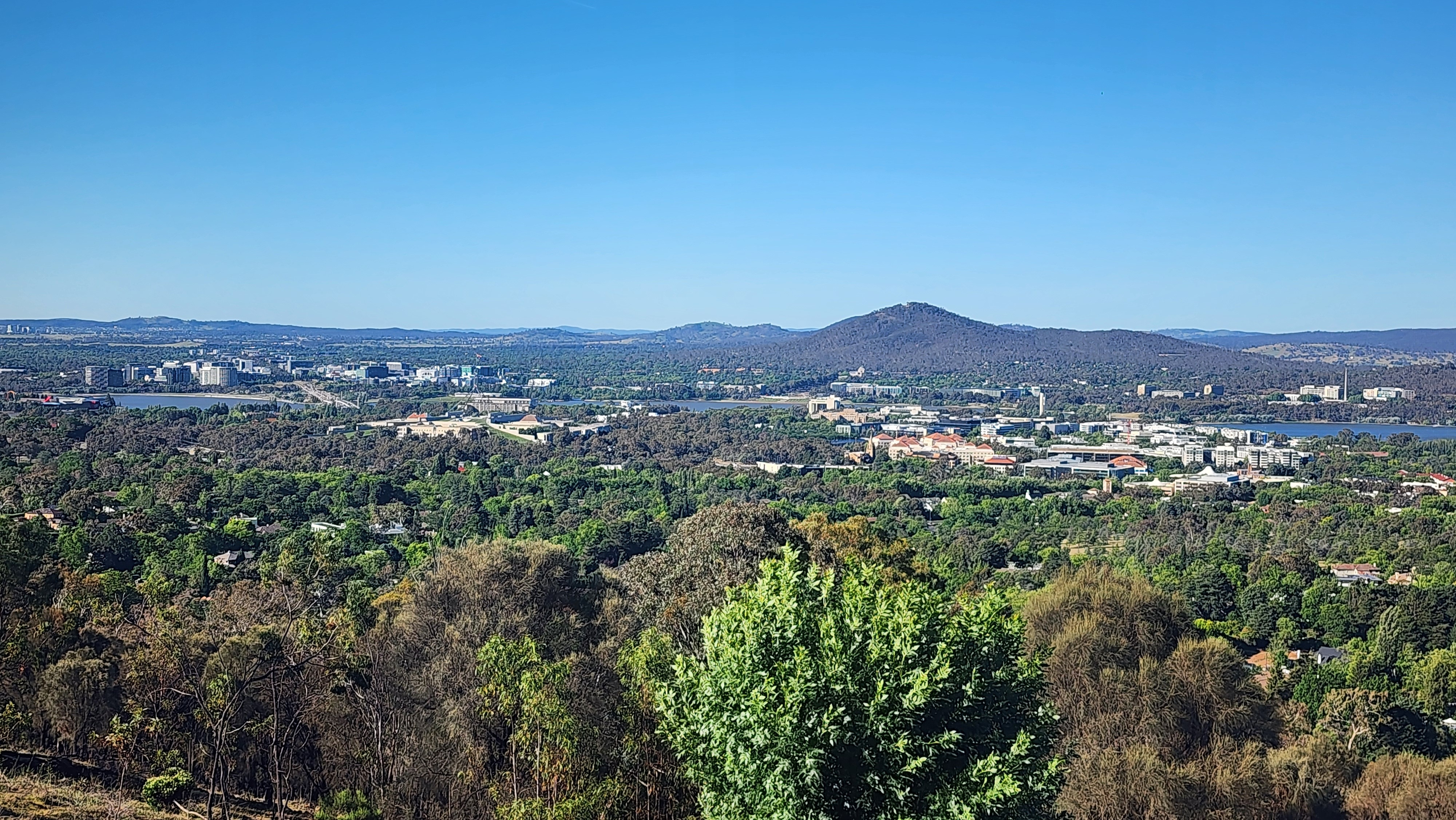
View to north to the Canberra City and Parliament House, Lake Burley Griffin, National Gallery of Australia, Questacon, National Library of Australia, High Court of Australia and DFAT

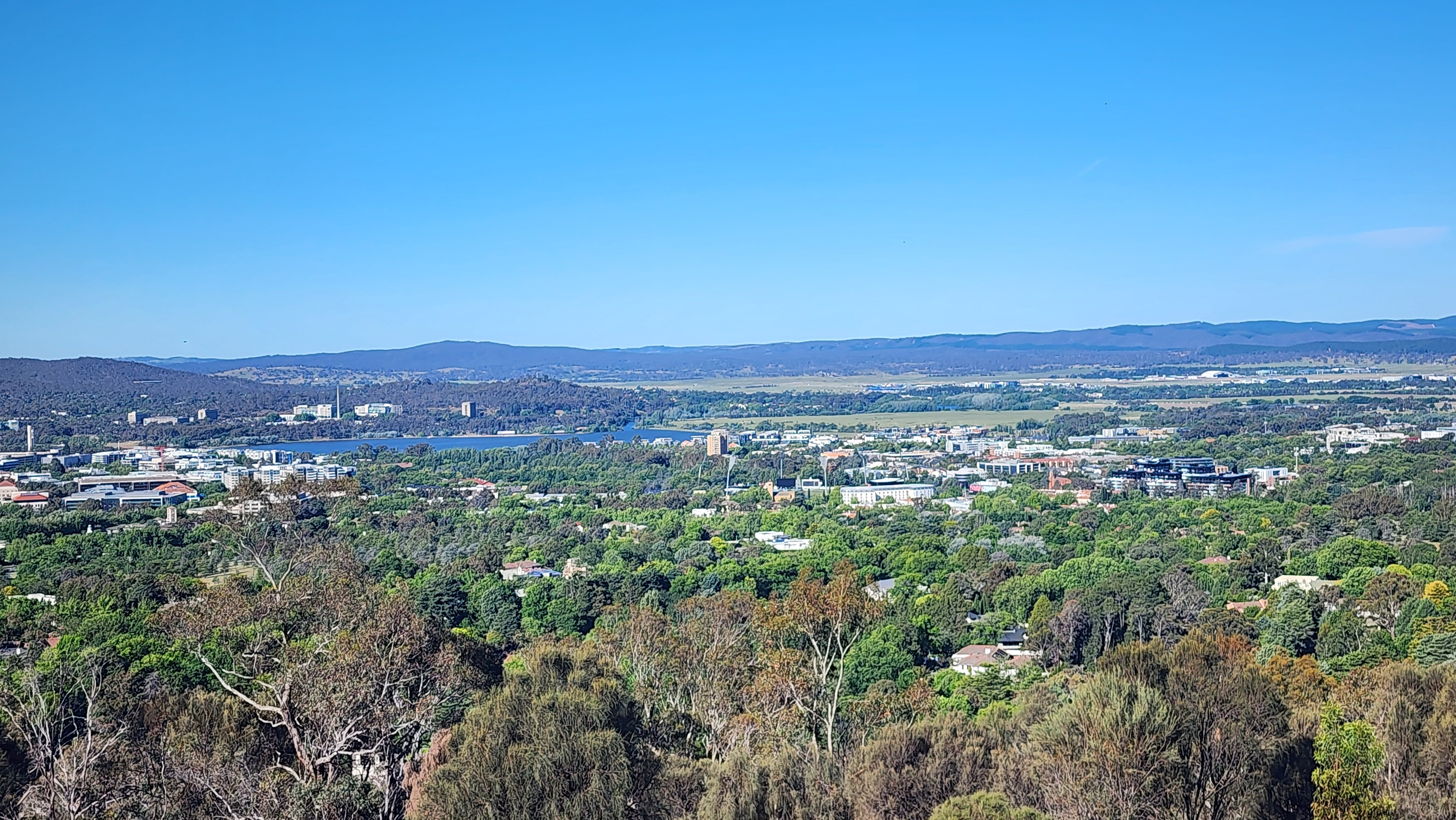
View to northeast to National Carillon, Australian–American Memorial, Kingstone, Canberra Airport and Fairbairn

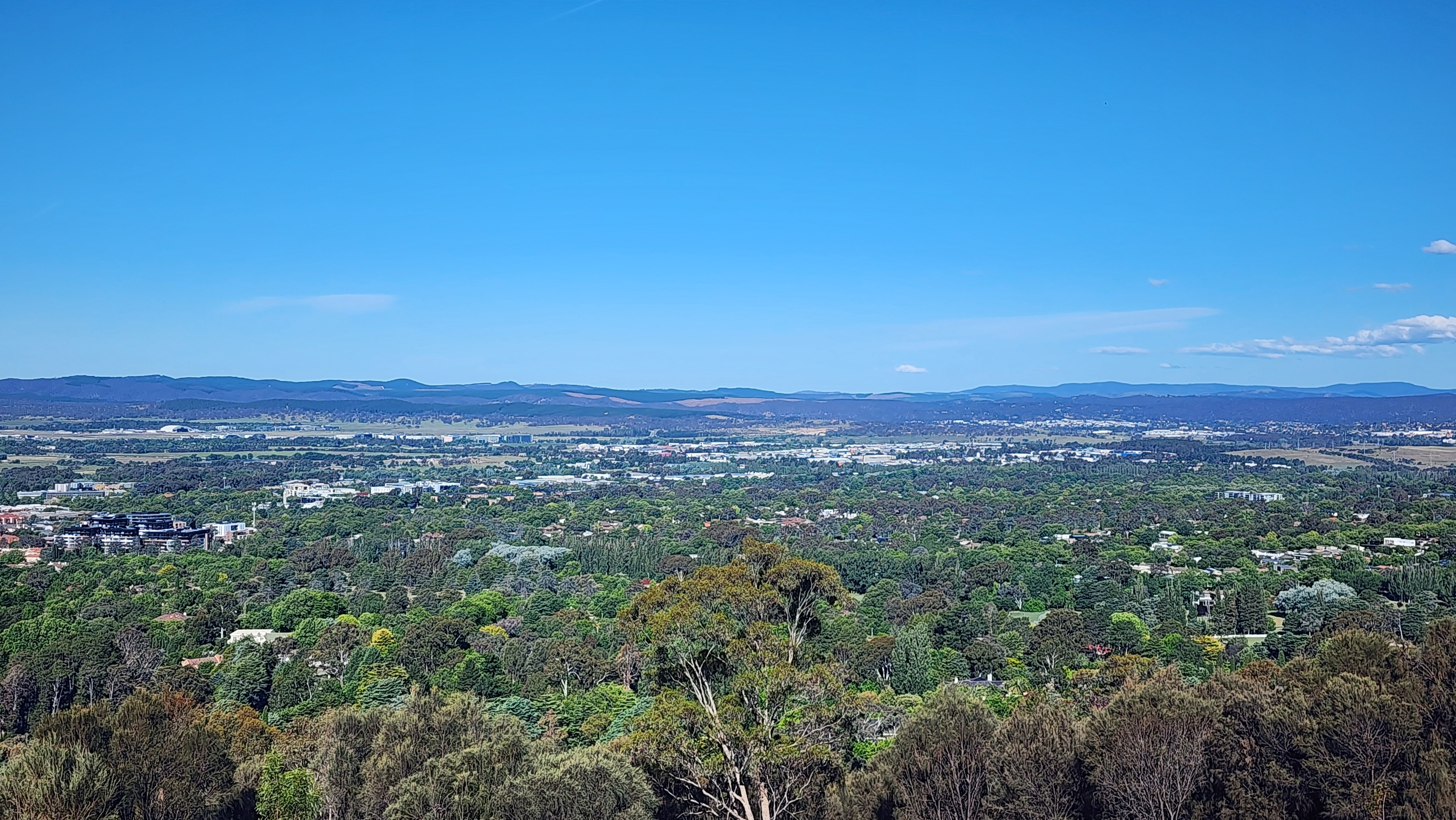
View to east to Canberra Airport, Fairbairn, Fyshwick and Canberra Outlet Centre

North to east view
