= Maria Hyde Hibbard =

American temperance leader (1820–1913)

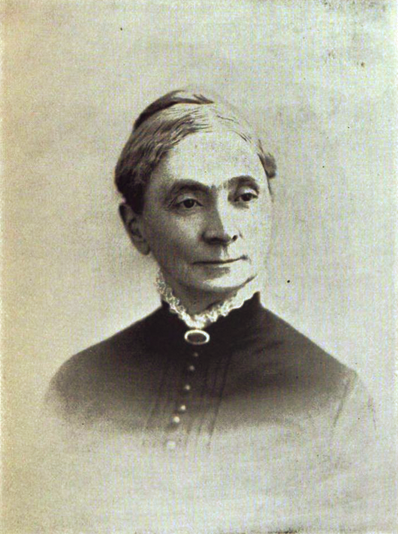
- Portrait from Two decades, 1894
- Born: Maria Hyde; September 10, 1820; Oxford, New York, U.S.
- Died: April 30, 1913 (aged 92); Clifton Springs, New York, U.S.
- Occupations: educator; executive
- Known for: President, New York State, Woman's Christian Temperance Union; President, New York Branch, Woman's Foreign Missionary Society of the Methodist Episcopal Church
- Spouse: Freeborn Garretson Hibbard (m. 1846; died 1895)

Maria Hyde Hibbard (née, Hyde; 1820–1913) was an American educator and an executive in two women's organizations. She served as President of the New York State Woman's Christian Temperance Union (WCTU) and of the New York Branch of the Woman's Foreign Missionary Society of the Methodist Episcopal Church.

== Early life and education ==
Maria Hyde was born in Oxford, Chenango County, New York, September 10, 1820. Her parents were Asahel Johnson Hyde (1797–1880) and Mary Osborne (Hinckley) (1798–1884). Maria's siblings were Orimal, Henry, Ammi, John, Mary, Peter, and Laura. The family home had a highly spiritual and intellectual atmosphere.

She was educated at the Oxford Academy.

== Career ==
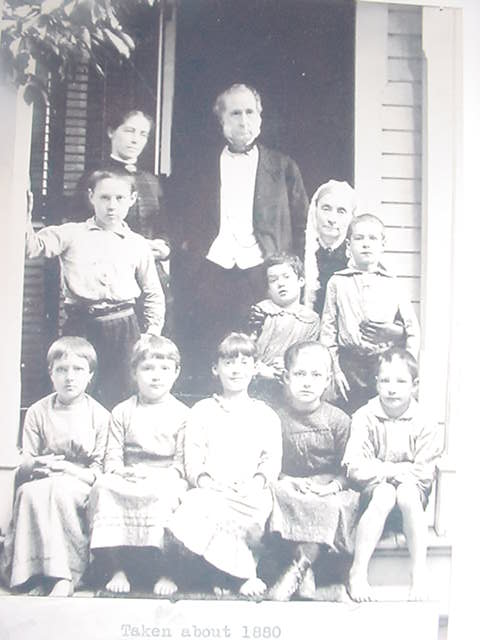
Rev. Hibbard standing next to his niece; Mrs. Hibbard seated to his lower left

After graduation and when only 18 years of age, she became the preceptress of in the Genesee Wesleyan Seminary, at Lima, New York. While holding that position, she married Rev. Freeborn Garretson Hibbard, D.D., of the Methodist Episcopal Church (MEC), in 1846. She went on to serve as associate principal of the Seneca Collegiate Institute, also of the Binghamton Academy; and was afterward preceptress of Oxford Academy.

Hibbard was elected as the second President of the New York State WCTU at Poughkeepsie in 1879, which office she filled for three years, ending the service only because of responsibilities at home. It was during these busy years that she organized temperance work among the Native Americans on the reservation in Western New York.

By 1877 and still in 1885, living in Clifton Springs, New York, Hibbard served as president of the New York Branch of the Woman's Foreign Missionary Society of the MEC, retaining the position for several years.

She kept even pace with her husband (the author of several theological works) in both literary and spiritual accomplishments.

== Personal life ==
When her husband became ill, she was obliged to put aside her public work and devote herself to his care; Rev. Hibbard died in 1895.

Maria Hyde Hibbard died in Clifton Springs, New York, April 30, 1913.
