= Andrew Fairbairn =

Andrew Fairbairn may refer to:

- Andrew Martin Fairbairn (1838–1912), Scottish theological scholar
- Sir Andrew Fairbairn (politician) (1828–1901), British Member of Parliament, 1880–1886
- Andrew Fairbairn (cricketer) (1862–1925), New Zealand cricketer
