= Polly Park =

Polly Park was an amateur gardener who created, with her husband Peter, the garden 'Boxford' at her suburban house in Red Hill in Canberra, Australia. She was United States born, and travelled around many parts of the world with her husband. In her garden she created separate sections, in which she experimented with the garden styles of different countries. These include several types, from an English knot to Indian. She described the garden in her book The World in My Garden. The fascination of the garden is the successful concentration of effort and imagination within a half acre house block. The garden was recorded by the National Trust.

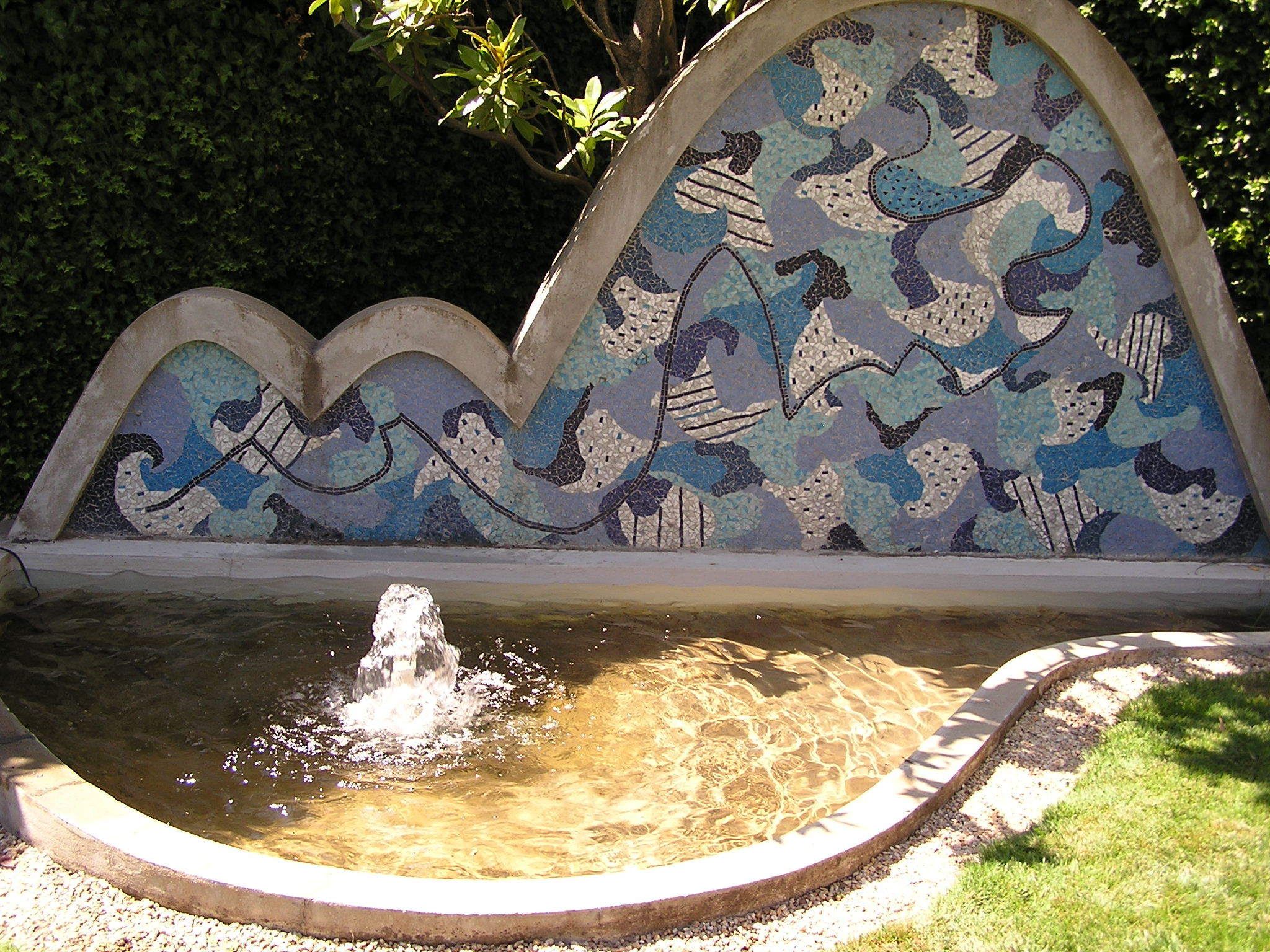
Fountain

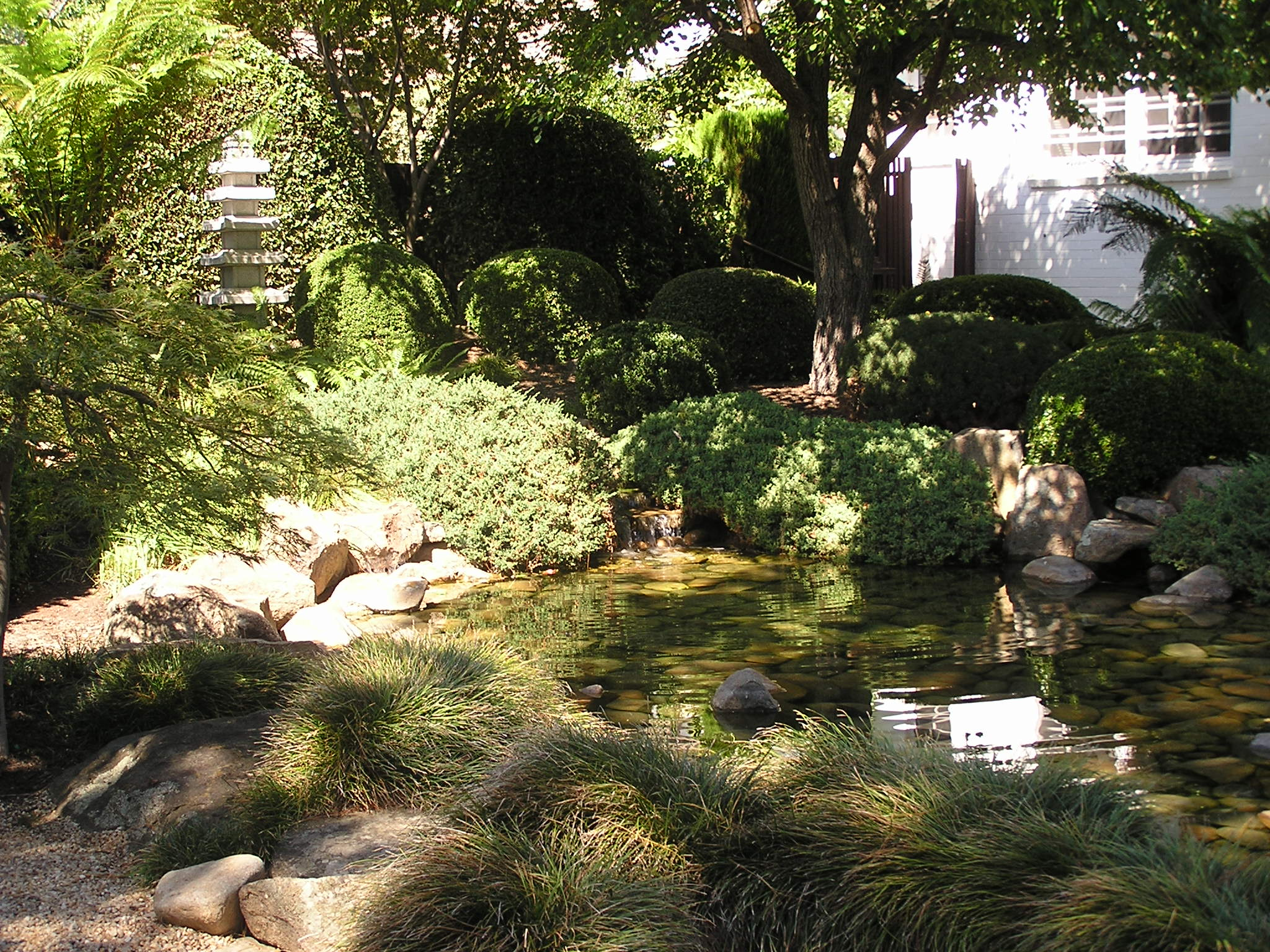
The Japanese garden

Despite the heritage listing the garden was destroyed after the Park's sold their home in 2006.

Polly Park died 10 May 2017 aged 96.
