= Fairburn (surname) =

The surname Fairburn may refer to:

- Charles Fairburn (1887–1945), Chief Mechanical Engineer of the London Midland & Scottish Railway
- Harold Fairburn (1884–1973), Inspector-General of the Straits Settlements Police (Singapore)
- Jeff Fairburn (born 1966), British businessman
- Paul Fairburn, British radio broadcaster
- Rex Fairburn (1904–1957), New Zealand poet
- William Armstrong Fairburn (1876–1947), author, naval architect, marine engineer, and industrialist
- T. C. Fairbairn (1874–1978), impresario
- William E. Fairbairn, (1885-1960) British Royal Marine and police officer.
