= Freeborn Garretson Hibbard =

Reverend Freeborn Garrettson Hibbard (February 22, 1811 - January 27, 1895) was an American Methodist minister, theologian, and author.

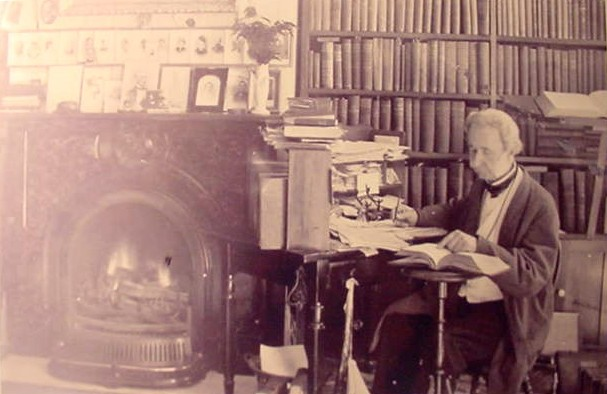
Reverend Freeborn Garrettson Hibbard in his study at Clifton Springs

== Life ==
His father, Reverend Billy Hibbard, was a well-known clergyman of the Methodist Episcopal Church. Freeborn entered the ministry of the same church in the New York conference at the age of eighteen, before he had completed his college course, and continued in this work chiefly in western New York from 1830 till 1856, when he was elected editor of the Northern Christian Advocate, printed in Auburn, New York. In 1860, he resumed the pastorate and became presiding elder of the Geneva district.

His wife, Maria Hyde Hibbard, served as President of the New York State Woman's Christian Temperance Union.

Hibbard died on January 27, 1895, in Clifton Springs, New York.

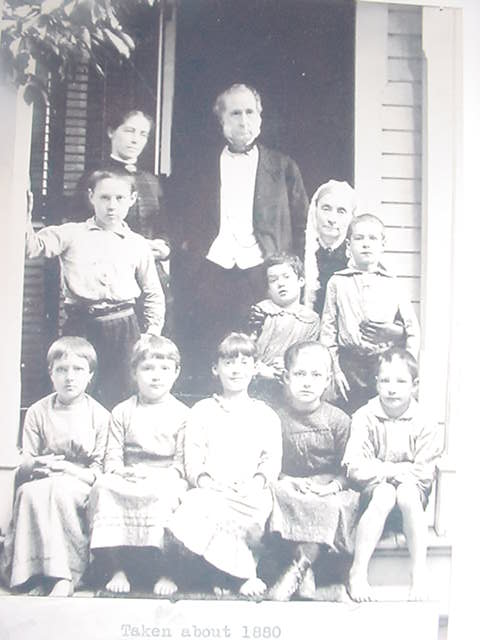
Reverend Freeborn Garrettson Hibbard with his niece Ellen Hinckley Hyde to his right and his wife Maria Hyde Hibbard to his lower left, with her arms around unidentified children

== Works ==
Dr. Hibbard's principal works are as follows:

- "Christian Baptism, its Subjects, and its Import, mode, Efficacy, and Relative Order" (New York, 1845).
- " Palestine: its geography and Bible history" (1851).
- "The Psalms, chronologically Arranged, with Historical Introductions, and a General Introduction to the Whole Book" (1856).
- "The Religion of Childhood, or Children in their Relation to Native Depravity, to the Atonement, to the Family, and to the Church" (1864).
- "Eschatology; or, The doctrine of the last things, according to the chronology and symbolism of the Apocalypse" (1890).

He also edited the "Sermons" (1869) and "Works" (1872), and published a "Biography of Bishop Leonidas L. Hamline" (1880). The "Commentary on the Psalm" (1882) in the Whedon series of "Commentaries on the Old Testament" was written by him. He also published a "History of the late East Genesee conference" (1887).
