= Freeborn (name) =

Freeborn is both a surname and a given name. Notable people with the name include:

Surname:

- Abigail Freeborn (born 1996) English cricketer
- Charles James Freeborn (died 1919), American United States Army soldier of World War I
- Frederick Freeborn, a member of Hut 7 at Bletchley Park in World War II
- Glenn Freeborn (born 1973), Australian rules footballer
- James Freeborn (1876–?), Canadian sport shooter
- John Freeborn (1919–2010), British World War II flying ace and Royal Air Force officer
- Scott Freeborn (born 1978), Scottish footballer
- Stanley B. Freeborn (1891–1960), Chancellor of University of California, Davis
- Stuart Freeborn (1914–2013), English make-up artist
- William Freeborn (1816–1900), pioneer in Minnesota, Montana, and California
- William Freeborn (settler) (1594–1670), founding settler of Portsmouth, Rhode Island

Given name:

- Freeborn Garrettson (1752–1827), American clergyman
- Freeborn Garretson Hibbard (1811–1895), American Methodist minister, theologian and writer
- Freeborn G. Jewett (1791–1858), American lawyer and politician

== See also ==
- Harrison J. Freebourn (1890–1954), Justice of the Montana Supreme Court
