= Andrew Fairbairn (cricketer) =

New Zealand cricketer

Personal information
- Born: 18 December 1862; Mallow, County Cork, Ireland
- Died: 24 July 1925 (aged 62); Marylebone, London, England
- Batting: Left-handed

Domestic team information
- Years: Team
- 1884/85: Otago
- Source: CricInfo, 8 May 2016

Andrew Fairbairn (18 December 1862 – 24 July 1925) was a cricketer. He played two first-class matches in New Zealand for Otago during the 1884–85 season.

Fairbairn was born in County Cork in Ireland in 1862. He worked as a merchant.
