= Freeborn Lake =

Lake in the state of Minnesota, United States

- Location within Minnesota
- Location: Douglas County, Minnesota
- Coordinates: 45°47′40″N 95°37′2″W
- Type: lake

Freeborn Lake is a lake in Douglas County, in the U.S. state of Minnesota.

Freeborn Lake was named for John Freeborn, a pioneer who settled in the area in 1868.
