= Robert Edis Fairbairn =

Canadian minister

- Born: June 17, 1879; Southampton, England
- Died: May 30, 1953 (aged 73); St Marys, Ontario, Canada
- Education: B.D., University of Oxford, 1904
- Occupation(s): minister, Methodist and United Church of Canada: England, 1904-14, Bermuda, 1914-17, Nova Scotia and Newfoundland, 1917-25, Ontario, 1925-49

Robert Edis Fairbairn (17 June 1879 - 30 May 1953) was a Canadian minister, writer, and pacifist.

Fairbairn became a committed pacifist after "firsthand exposure to the reactions of young men in bayonet drill", and within a decade of the First World War he emerged as "one of the most prolific pacifist writers in Canada". Later, Fairbairn helped R. B. Y. Scott and Gregory Vlastos to produce Towards the Christian Revolution (1936). In his chapter, he argued that one of the primary functions of the Christian faith was to generate opposition to war. In 1939, Fairbairn drafted a manifesto entitled Witness Against War, ultimately signed by over 150 United Churchmen.

Fairbairn was often critical of the church for its failure to oppose escalating violence throughout the world. By the end of his career, he had become "the most outspoken radical pacifist in Canada".

Regarding his contributions to Christian pacifism:

"His pacifist argument incorporated the socialist analysis of Western capitalism as the "war system", a system which compelled otherwise honorable men to act unscrupulously and which made future war inevitable. Since he saw it as the root cause of conflict between nations as well as between classes, he believed the only alternative was a complete social revolution according to the teachings of Christ.... In his later search for realistic pacifist solutions he came to view Christian cooperative communities as the true revolutionary cells of a new social order."
