= Fairburn, New Zealand =

Rural settlement in New Zealand

Fairburn
- Hamlet
- Interactive map of Fairburn
- Coordinates: 35.1044698°S 173.3982806°E
- Country: New Zealand
- Region: Northland Region
- District: Far North District

Government
  - Territorial Authority: Far North District Council
  - Regional council: Northland Regional Council

Fairburn is a hamlet east of Kaitaia, in the Northland Region of New Zealand.

The Fairburn-Kaiaka Hall is a community hall in Fairburn, built in 1910. Fairburn Cemetery is run by the community.

Fairburn School was an educational institute that ran from 1889 to 1947. The school registers were given to Kaitaia Primary School after the closing. The Fairburn Schoolhouse was a schoolhouse built in at least 1919 and closed in 1945.
