= George Fairbairn =

George Fairbairn may refer to:

- George Fairbairn (rugby), Scottish-born rugby union player and English rugby league international
- George Fairbairn (pastoralist) (1816–1895), Scottish-Australian pastoralist
- George Fairbairn (politician) (1855–1943), Australian politician
- George Eric Fairbairn (1888–1915), British Olympic rower
