= John Fairbairn =

John Fairbairn may refer to:

- Jock Fairbairn (fl. 1890s), Scottish football goalkeeper with Heart of Midlothian
- John Fairbairn (educator) (1794–1854), newspaper proprietor, educator, financier and politician
- John Fairbairn, prisoner on St. Michael of Scarborough
- John Fairbairn (skeleton racer) (born 1983), Canadian skeleton racer
- John Fairbairn (naval officer) (1912–1984), South African naval officer who annexed the Prince Edward Islands for South Africa
- Kaʻimi Fairbairn, full name John Christian Kaʻiminoeauloamekaʻikeokekumupaʻa Fairbairn (born 1994), American football player
