= Canberra =

Capital city of Australia

Canberra Kanbarra (Ngunawal)
- City
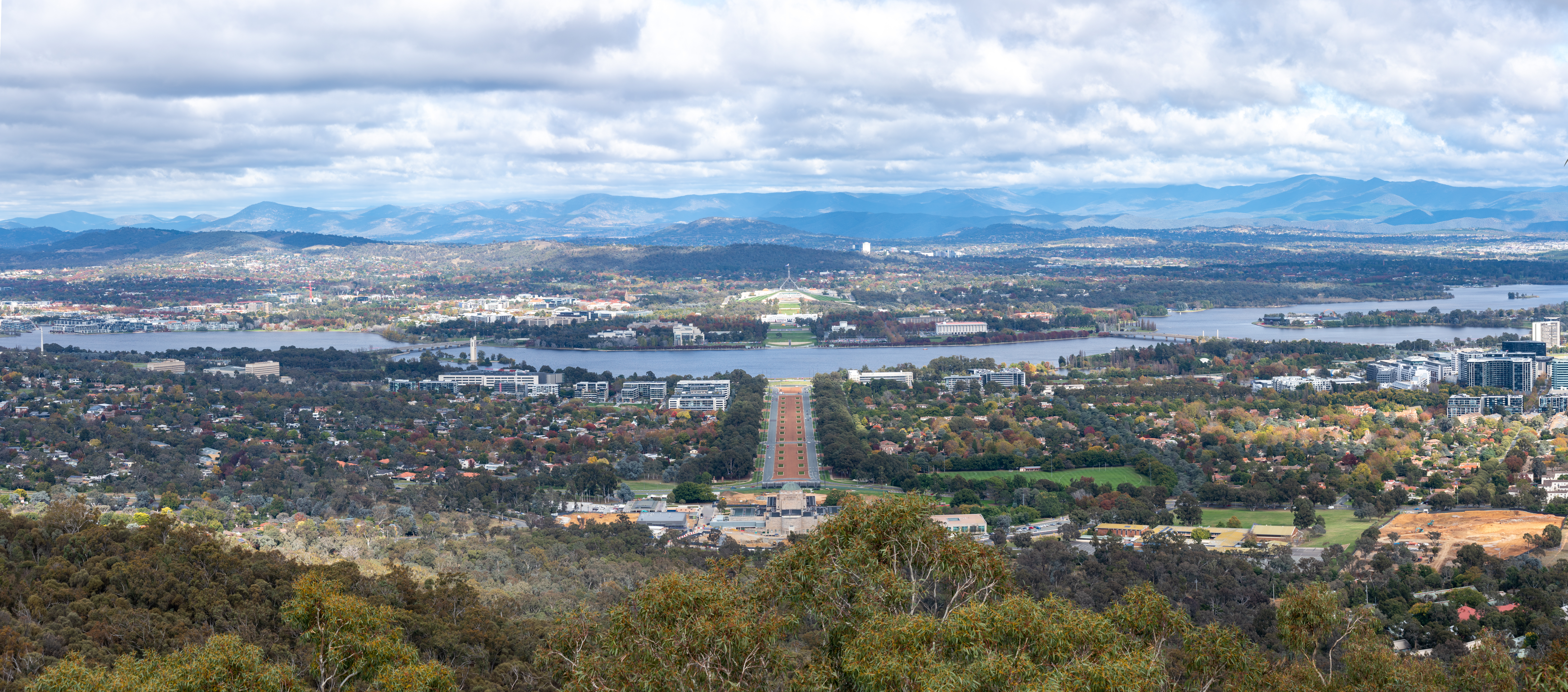
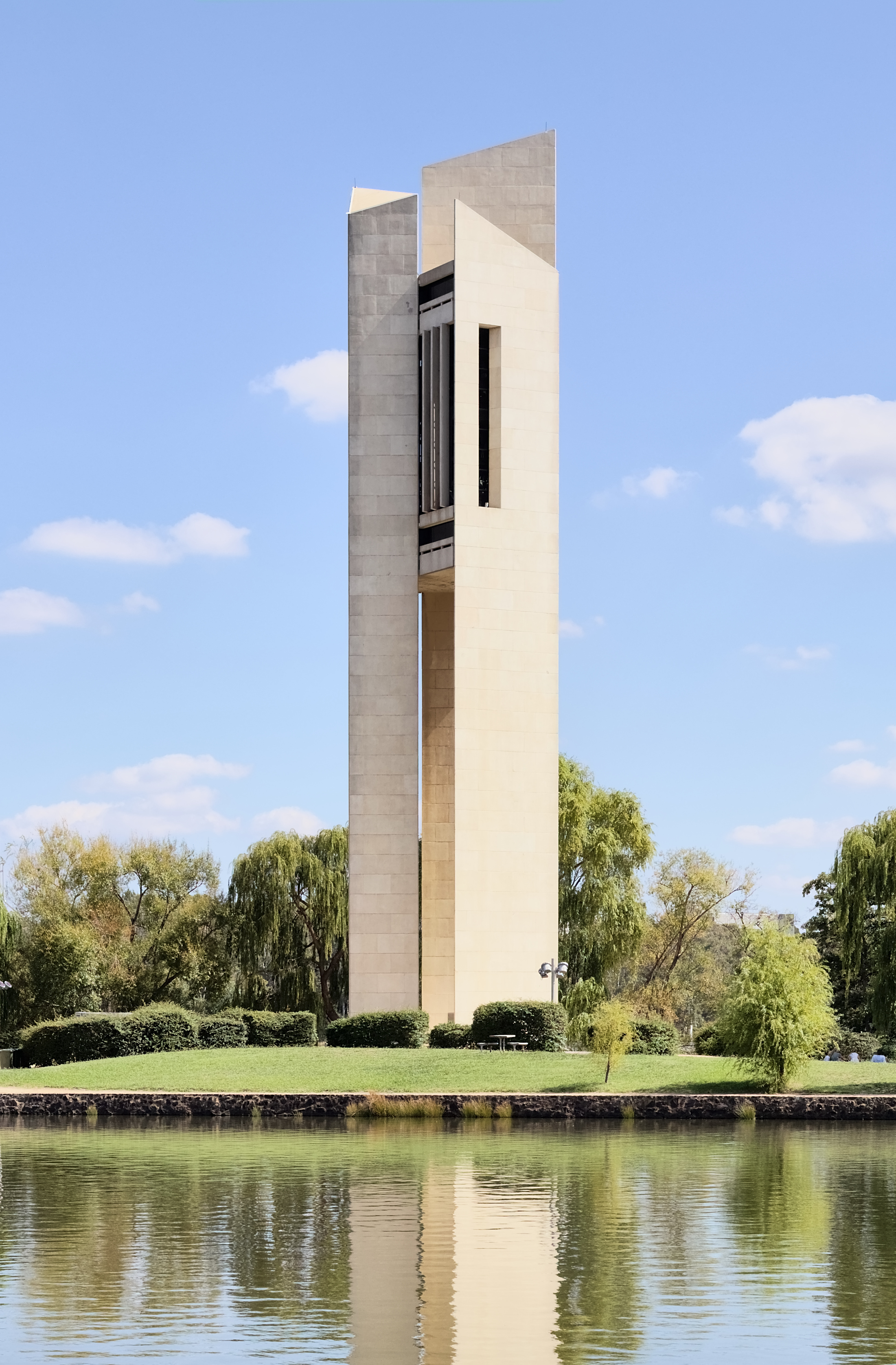
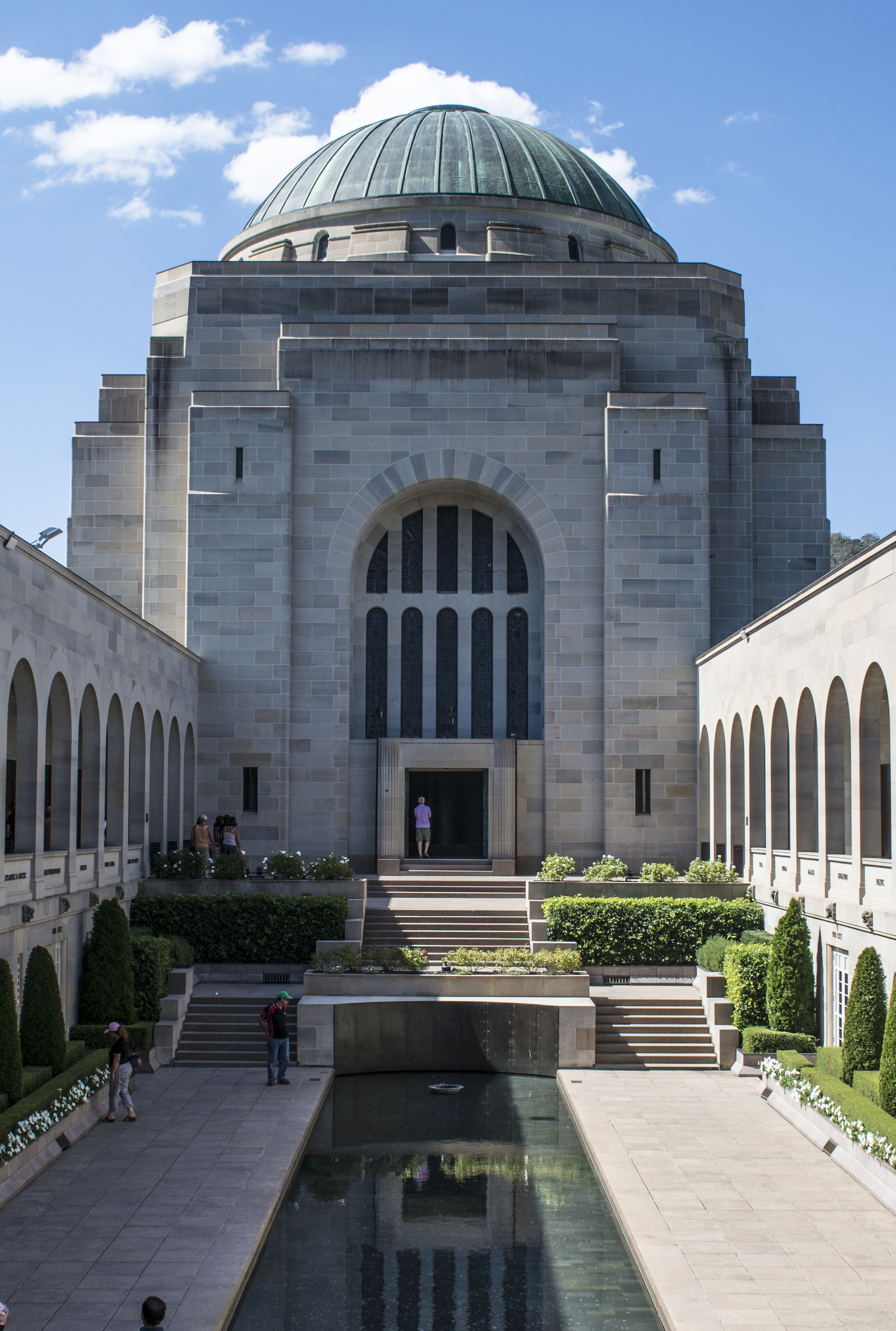
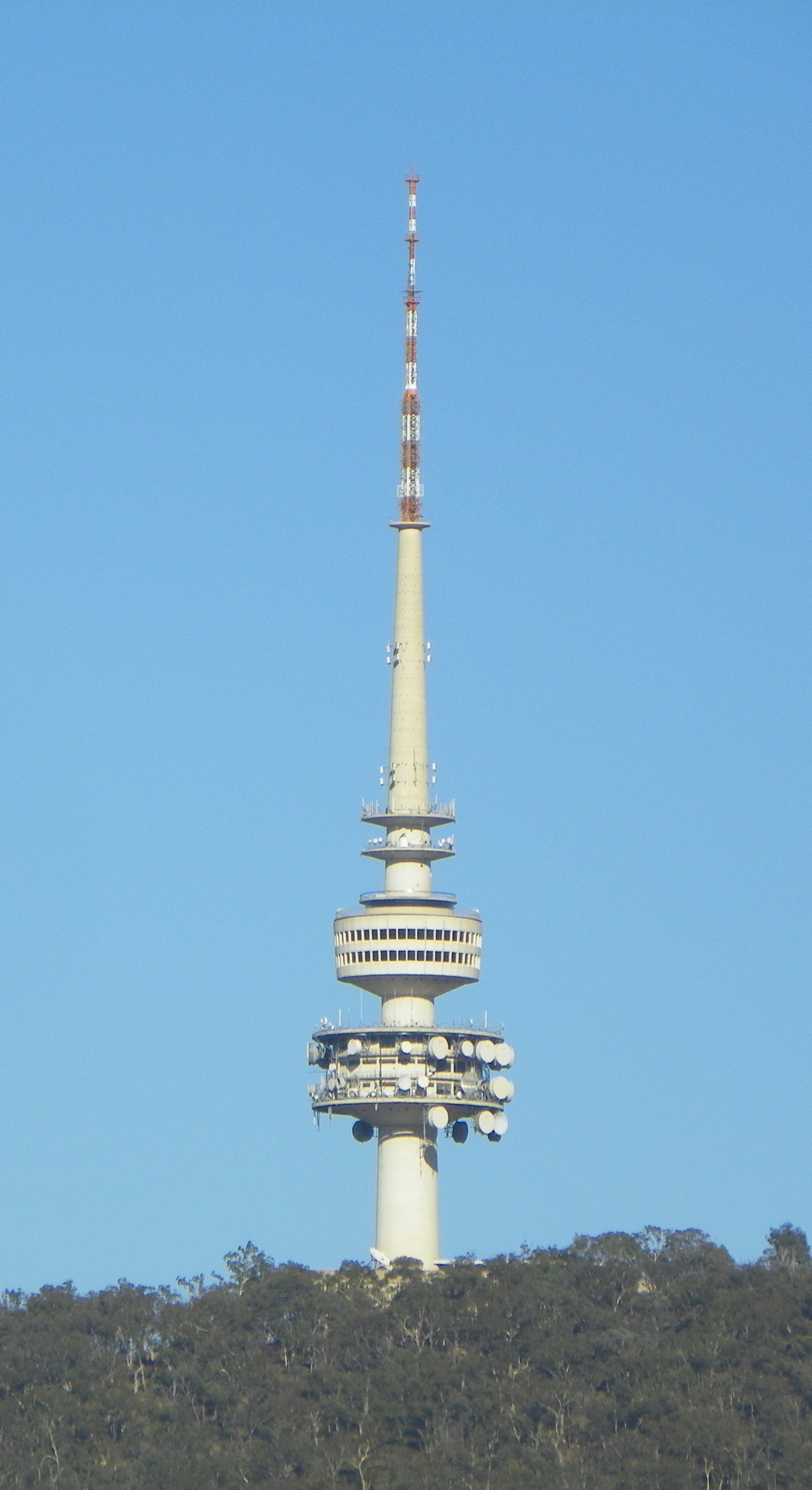
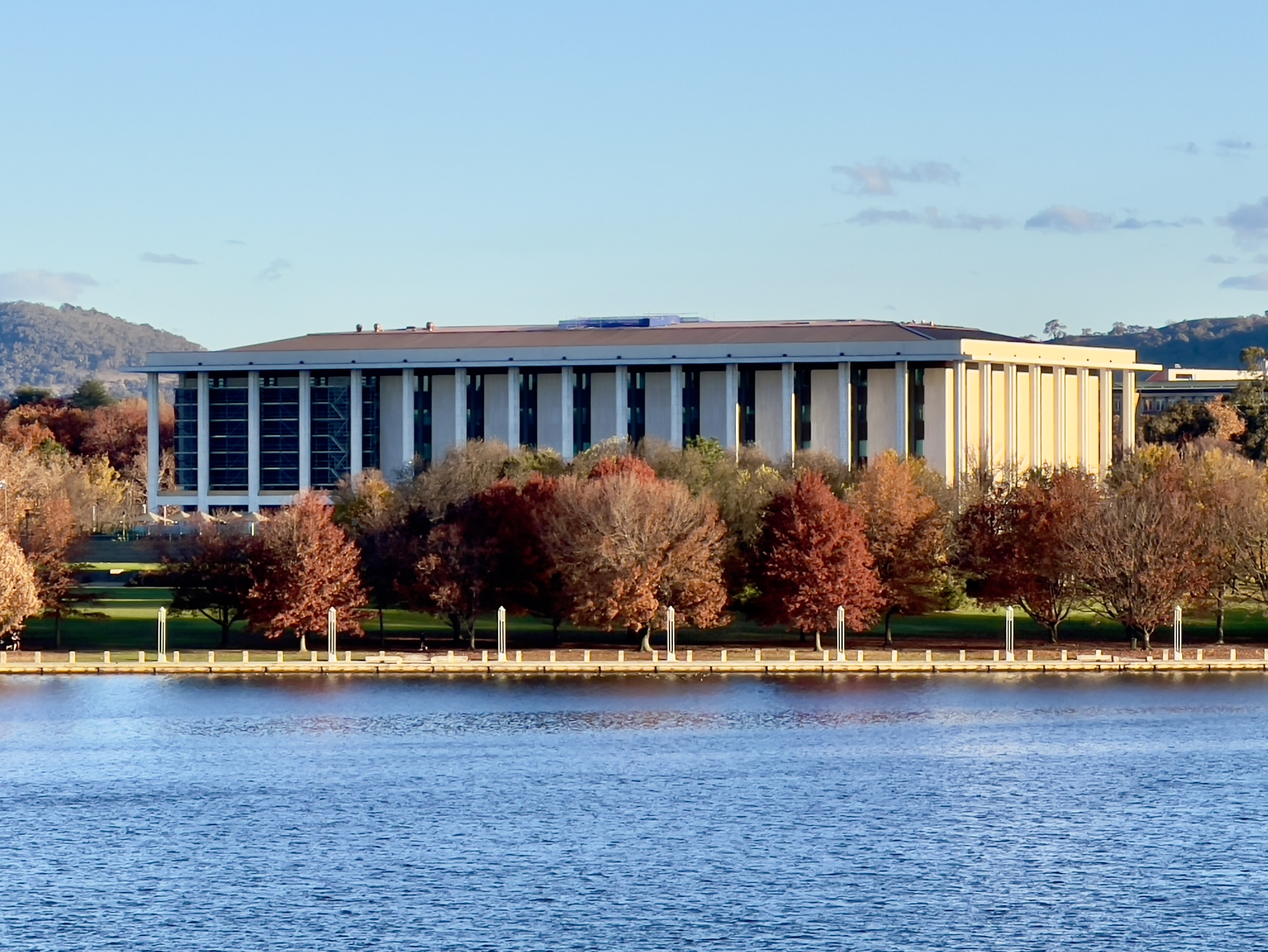
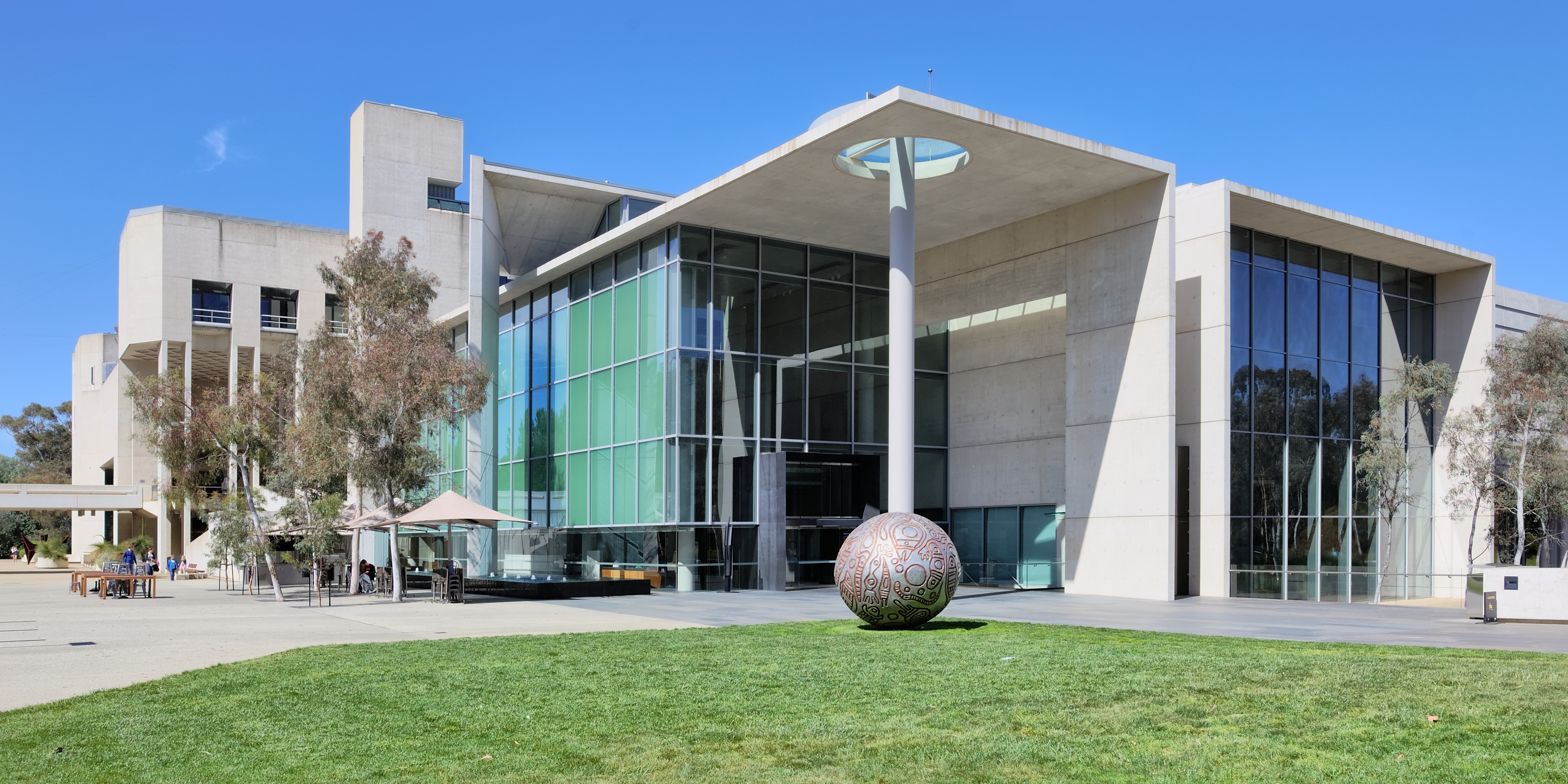
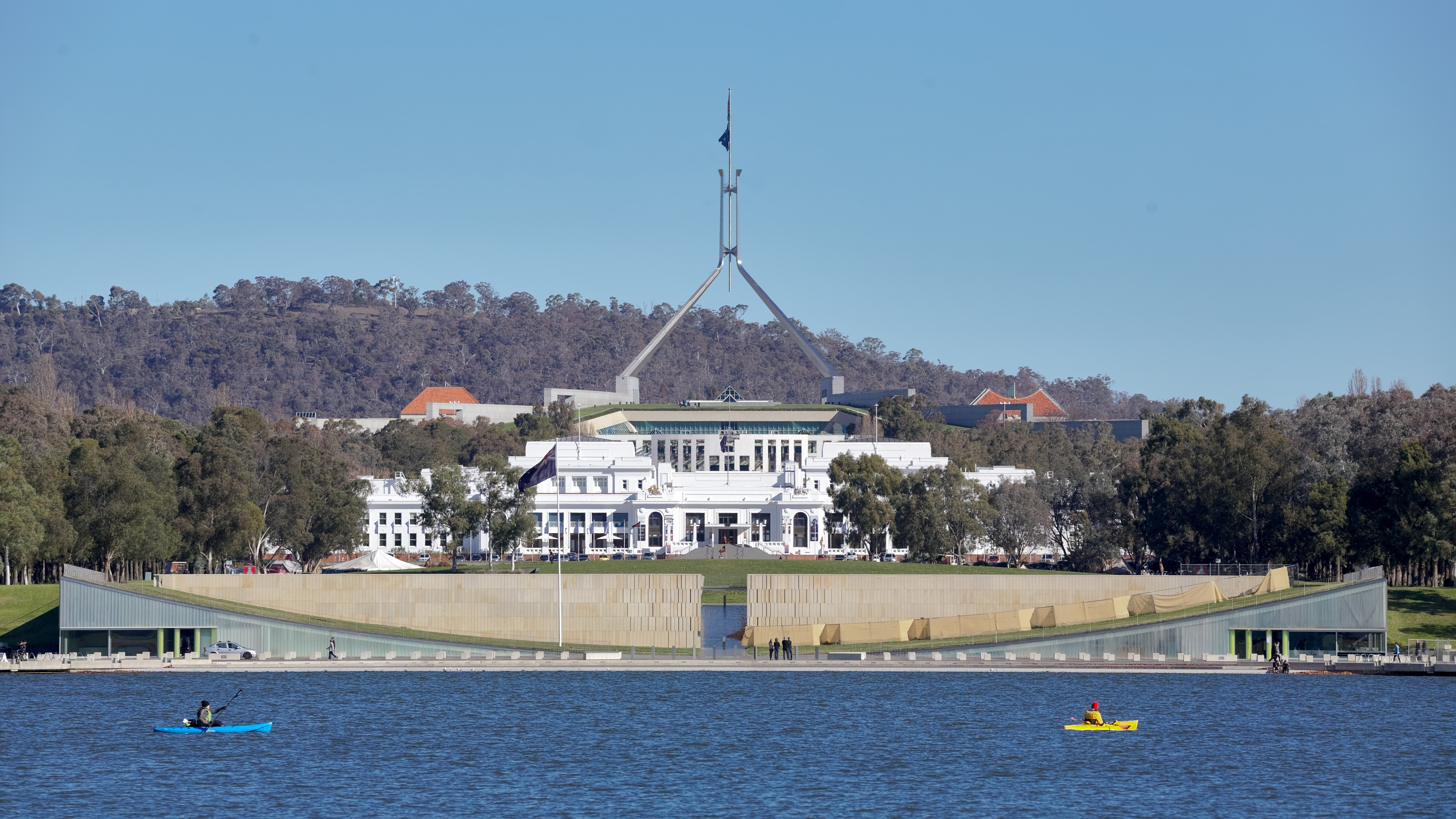
- Canberra viewed from Mount Ainslie National Carillon Australian War Memorial Telstra Tower National Library of Australia National Gallery of Australia Capital Hill and Old Parliament House

- Coordinates: 35°17′35″S 149°07′37″E
- Country: Australia
- State: Australian Capital Territory
- Location: 285 km (177 mi) SW of Sydney; 669 km (416 mi) NE of Melbourne; 1,160 km (720 mi) E of Adelaide; 1,232 km (766 mi) SSW of Brisbane; 3,632 km (2,257 mi) ESE of Perth
- Established: 12 March 1913; 113 years ago

Government
  - Territory electorates: Brindabella; Ginninderra; Kurrajong; Murrumbidgee; Yerrabi
  - Federal divisions: Canberra; Fenner; Bean

Area
  - Total: 2,358 km^{2} (910 sq mi)
- Elevation: 578 m (1,896 ft)

Population
  - Total: 484,630 (June 2025) (8th)
  - Density: 205.53/km^{2} (532.31/sq mi)
- Time zone: UTC+10:00 (AEST)
  - Summer (DST): UTC+11:00 (AEDT)
- Mean max temp: 20.4 °C (68.7 °F)
- Mean min temp: 7.0 °C (44.6 °F)
- Annual rainfall: 579.5 mm (22.81 in)

Canberra (/ˈkænbrə/ KAN-brə; Ngunawal: Kanbarra) is the capital city of Australia and the largest population centre in the Australian Capital Territory. With an estimated population of 484,630 as of 2025, Canberra is Australia's largest inland city and the eighth-largest Australian city by population. The city occupies most of the northern quadrant of the Australian Capital Territory, and its urban sprawl borders the state of New South Wales to the northwest, northeast and southeast. The Brindabellas are located south and west of the city, and form the northern part of the Australian Alps, the country's highest mountain range.

Canberra was established following the federation of the Australian colonies to serve as the seat of government for the new nation, being a compromise between Sydney and Melbourne, Australia’s two largest cities. The area chosen for the capital had been inhabited by Aboriginal Australians for up to 21,000 years, by groups including the Ngunnawal and Ngambri. European settlement commenced in the first half of the 19th century, evidenced by surviving landmarks such as St John's Anglican Church and Blundells Cottage. On 1 January 1901, federation of the colonies of Australia was achieved. The capital city was founded and formally named as Canberra in 1913. Unusual among Australian cities, it is an entirely planned city, grounded in a design by American architects Walter Burley Griffin and Marion Mahony Griffin. The Griffins' plan was influenced by the garden city movement and featured geometric motifs aligned with significant topographical landmarks such as Black Mountain, Mount Ainslie, Capital Hill and City Hill. Its design can be viewed from its highest point at the Telstra Tower and the summit of Mount Ainslie. Other notable features include the National Arboretum and Lake Burley Griffin.

As the seat of the Government of Australia, Canberra is home to many important institutions of the federal government, national monuments and museums. These include Parliament House, Government House, the High Court building and the headquarters of numerous government agencies. Social and cultural institutions of national significance include the Australian War Memorial, the Australian National University, the Royal Australian Mint, the Australian Institute of Sport, the National Gallery, the National Museum and the National Library. The city is home to many important institutions of the Australian Defence Force including the Royal Military College Duntroon and the Australian Defence Force Academy. It hosts all foreign embassies in Australia as well as regional headquarters of many international organisations, not-for-profit groups, lobbying groups and professional associations.

Canberra has been ranked among the world's best cities to live in and visit. Compared to the national averages, the unemployment rate is lower and the average income higher; tertiary education levels are higher, while the population is younger. At the 2021 Census, 28.7% of Canberra's inhabitants were reported as having been born overseas. The Australian Public Service accounted for about 25% all jobs as at November 2025. Other major industries include health care, professional services, education and training, retail, accommodation and food, and construction. Annual cultural events include Floriade, the largest flower festival in the Southern Hemisphere, the Enlighten Festival, Skyfire, the National Multicultural Festival and Summernats. Canberra's main sporting venues are Canberra Stadium and Manuka Oval. The city is served with domestic and international flights at Canberra Airport, while interstate train and coach services depart from Canberra railway station and the Jolimont Centre respectively. City Interchange and Alinga Street station form the hub of Canberra's bus and light rail transport network.

== Name ==
The word "Canberra" is derived from the Ngunnawal language of a local Ngunnawal or Ngambri clan who resided in the area and were referred to by the early British colonists as either the Canberry, Kanberri or Nganbra tribe. Joshua John Moore, the first European land-owner in the region, named his grant "Canberry" in 1823 after these people. "Canberry Creek" and "Canberry" first appeared on regional maps from 1830, while the derivative name "Canberra" started to appear from around 1857. Other early recorded variants of the spelling include "Canbury" (potentially influenced by the settlement of the same name in England), "Canburry" and "Kembery".

Numerous local commentators, including the Ngunnawal elder Don Bell, have speculated upon possible meanings of "Canberra" over the years. These include "meeting place", "woman's breasts" and "the hollow between a woman's breasts". References to breasts or the space between them are thought to derive from Black Mountain and Mount Ainslie, two large hills with similar elevations situated immediately to the northwest and northeast, respectively, of what is now the city centre.

Alternative proposals for the name of the city during its planning included Austral, Australville, Aurora, Captain Cook, Caucus City, Cookaburra, Dampier, Eden, Eucalypta, Flinders, Gonebroke, Home, Hopetoun, Kangaremu, Myola, Meladneyperbane, New Era, Olympus, Paradise, Shakespeare, Sydmelperadbrisho, Swindleville, The National City, Union City, Unison, Wattleton, Wheatwoolgold, Yass-Canberra.

== History ==
=== First Nations peoples ===
The first peoples of the Canberra area include the Ngunnawal, Ngunawal and Ngambri peoples. Other groups claiming a connection to the land include the Ngarigo (who also lived directly to the south) and the Ngambri-Guumaal. Neighbouring groups include the Wandandian to the east, the Walgulu also to the south, Gandangara people to the north and Wiradjuri to the north-west.

The first British settlers into the Canberra area described two clans of Ngunnawal people resident to the vicinity. The Canberry or Nganbra clan lived mostly around Sullivan's Creek and had ceremonial grounds at the base of Galambary (Black Mountain), while the Pialligo clan had land around what is now Canberra Airport. The people living here carefully managed and cultivated the land with fire, farmed yams, and hunted for food.

Archaeological evidence of settlement in the region includes inhabited rock shelters, rock paintings and engravings, burial places, camps and quarry sites as well as stone tools and arrangements. Artefacts suggests early human activity occurred at some point in the area 21,000 years previously.

Still today, Ngunnawal men into the present conduct ceremony on the banks of the river, Murrumbidgee River. They travel upstream as they receive their Totems and corresponding responsibilities for land management. 'Murrum' means 'Pathway' and Bidgee means 'Boss'.

The submerged limestone caves beneath Lake Burley Griffin contained Aboriginal rock art, some of the only sites in the region.

Galambary (Black Mountain) is an important Aboriginal meeting and business site, predominantly for men's business. According to the Ngunnawal and Ngambri people, Mt Ainslie is primarily for place of women's business. Black Mountain and Mount Ainslie are referred to as women's breasts. Galambary was also used by Ngunnawal people as an initiation site, with the mountain itself said to represent the growth of a boy into a man.

=== British exploration and colonisation ===
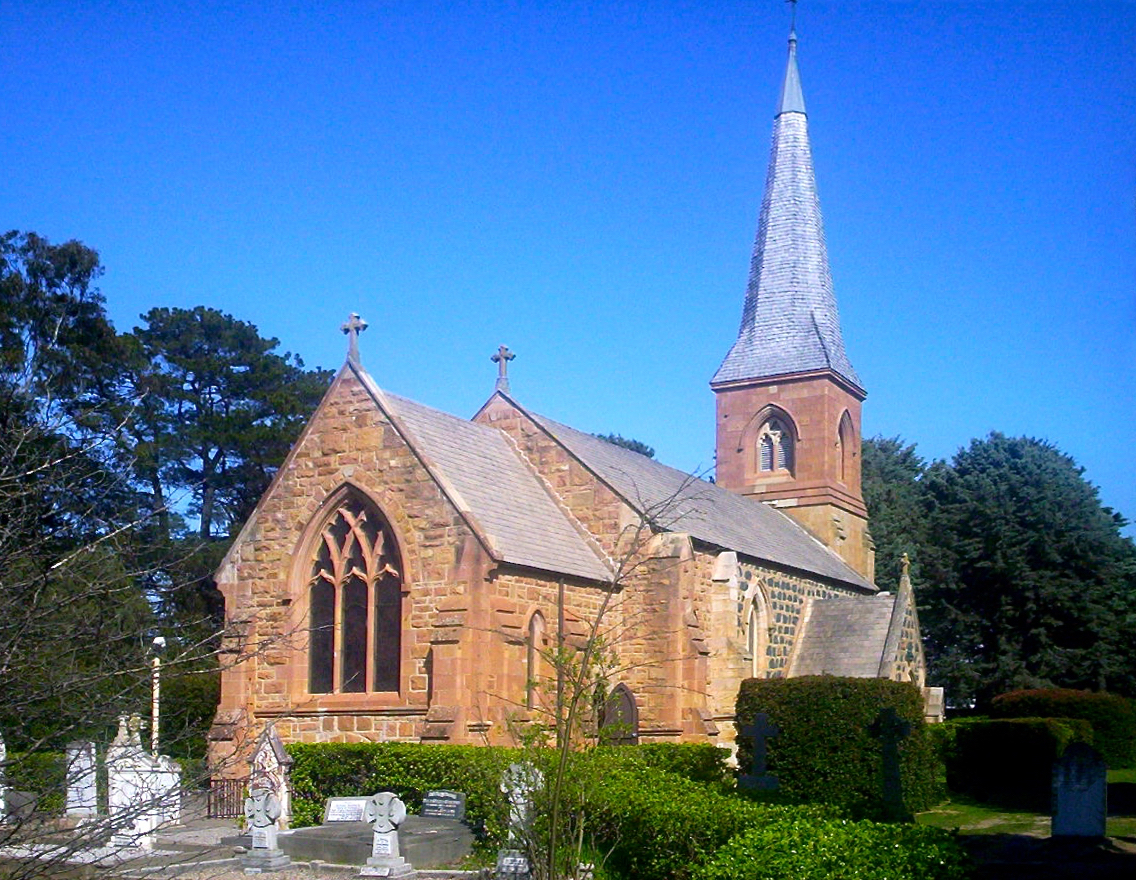
St John's Anglican Church, the oldest surviving public building in the inner city, consecrated in 1845

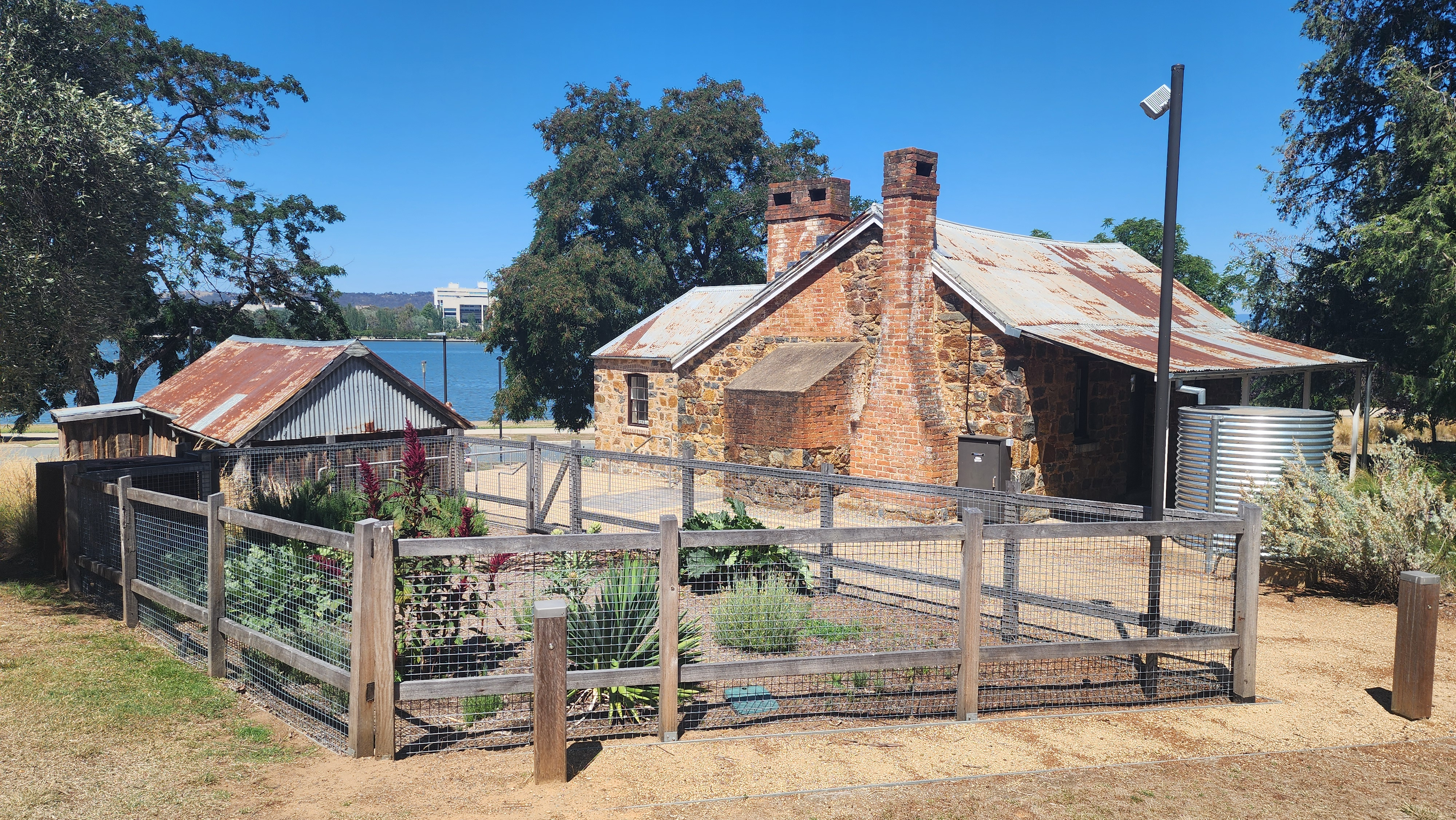
Blundells Cottage, built around 1860, is one of the few remaining buildings built by the first white settlers of Canberra.

In October 1820, Charles Throsby Smith led the first British expedition to the area. Four other expeditions occurred between 1820 and 1823 with the first accurate map being produced by explorer Mark John Currie in June 1823. By this stage, the area had become known as the Limestone Plains.

British settlement of the area probably dates from late 1823, when a sheep station was formed on what is now the Acton Peninsula by James Cowan, the head stockman employed by Joshua John Moore. Moore had received a land grant in the region in 1823 and formally applied to purchase the site on 16 December 1826. He named the property "Canberry". On 30 April 1827, Moore was told by letter that he could retain possession of 1,000 acres (405 ha) at Canberry.

Other colonists soon followed Moore's example to take up land in the region. Around 1825, James Ainslie, working on behalf of the wealthy merchant Robert Campbell, arrived to establish a sheep station. He was guided to the region by a local Aboriginal girl who showed him the fine lands of her Pialligo clan. The area then became the property of Campbell and it was initially named Pialligo before Campbell changed it to the Scottish title of Duntroon. Campbell and his family built a dairy on the site in 1832, now regarded as the oldest standing European building in Canberra, followed by the imposing stone house that is now the officers' mess of the Royal Military College, Duntroon. The Campbells sponsored settlement by other farmer families to work their land, such as the Southwells of "Weetangera".

Other notable early colonists included Henry Donnison, who established the Yarralumla estate—now the site of the official residence of the Governor-General of Australia—in 1827, and John Palmer who employed Duncan Macfarlane to form the Jerrabomberra property in 1828. A year later, John MacPherson established the Springbank estate, becoming the first British owner-occupier in the region.

The Anglican church of St John the Baptist, in the suburb of Reid, was consecrated in 1845, and is now the oldest surviving public building in the city. St John's churchyard contains the earliest graves in the district. It has been described as a "sanctuary in the city", remaining a small English village-style church even as the capital grew around it. Canberra's first school, St John's School (now a museum), was situated next to the church and opened in the same year of 1845. It was built to educate local settlers children, including the Blundell children who lived in nearby Blundell's Cottage.

As the European presence increased, the Indigenous population dwindled largely due to the destruction of their society, dislocation from their lands and from introduced diseases such as influenza, smallpox, alcoholism, and measles.

=== Creation of the nation's capital ===
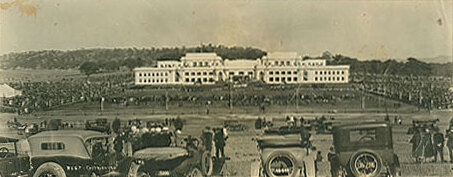
The opening of Parliament House in May 1927

The district's change from a rural area in New South Wales to the national capital started during debates over federation in the late 19th century. Following a long dispute over whether Sydney or Melbourne should be the national capital, a compromise was reached: the new capital would be built in New South Wales, so long as it was at least 100 mi (160 km) from Sydney, with Melbourne to be the temporary seat of government while the new capital was built. A survey was conducted across several sites in New South Wales with Bombala, southern Monaro, Orange, Yass, Albury, Tamworth, Armidale, Tumut, and Dalgety all discussed. Dalgety was chosen by the federal parliament and it passed the Seat of Government Act 1904 confirming Dalgety as the site of the nation's capital. However, the New South Wales government refused to cede the required territory as they did not accept the site. In 1906, the New South Wales Government finally agreed to cede sufficient land provided that it was in the Yass-Canberra region as this site was closer to Sydney. Newspaper proprietor John Gale circulated a pamphlet titled 'Dalgety or Canberra: Which?' advocating Canberra to every member of the Commonwealth's seven state and federal parliaments. By many accounts, it was decisive in the selection of Canberra as the site in 1908 as was a result of survey work done by the government surveyor Charles Scrivener. The NSW government ceded the district to the federal government in 1911 and the Federal Capital Territory was established.

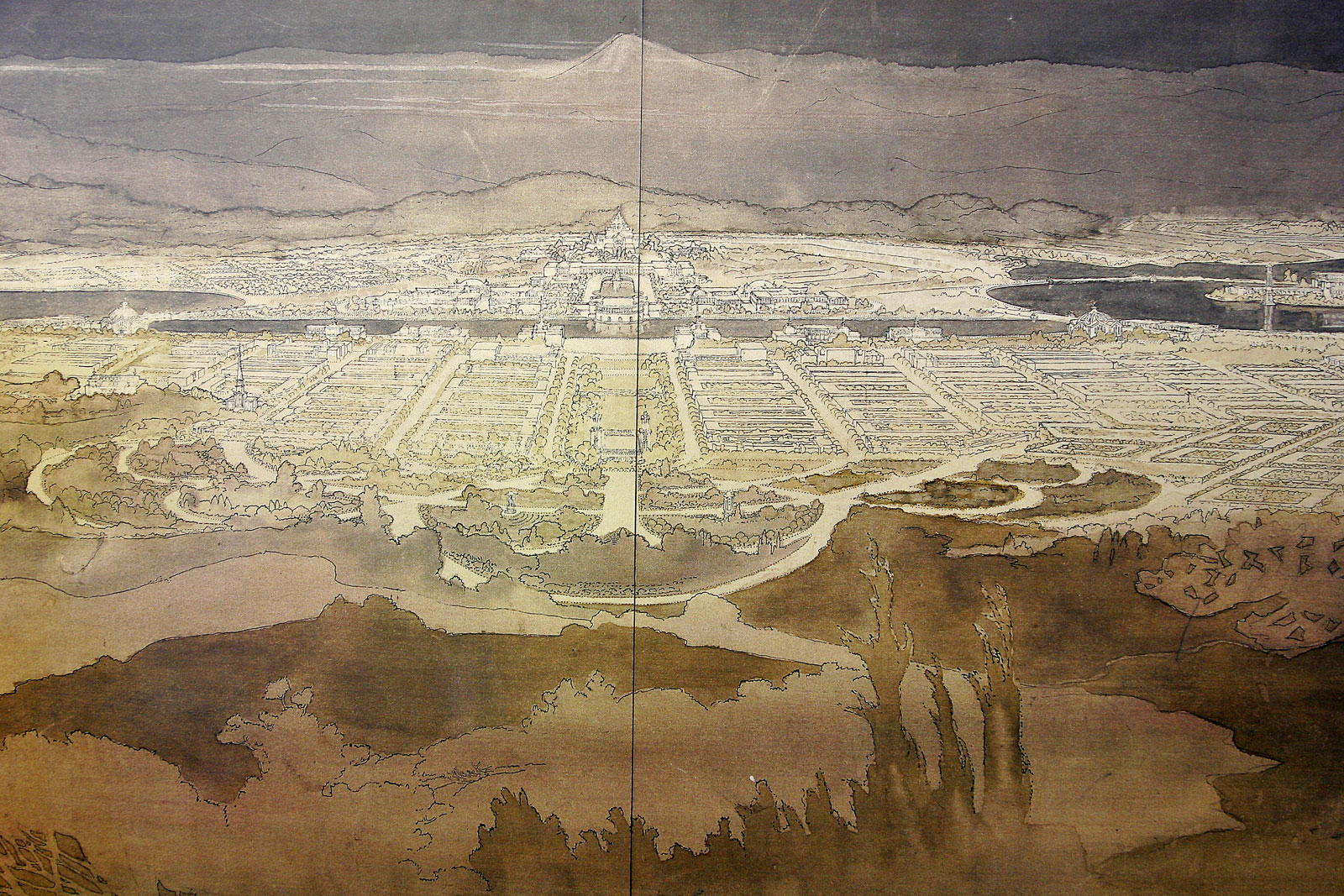
The Griffins' plan for Canberra

An international design competition was launched by the Department of Home Affairs on 30 April 1911, closing on 31 January 1912. The competition was boycotted by the Royal Institute of British Architects, the Institution of Civil Engineers and their affiliated bodies throughout the British Empire because the Minister for Home Affairs King O'Malley insisted that the final decision was for him to make rather than an expert in city planning. A total of 137 valid entries were received. O'Malley appointed a three-member board to advise him but they could not reach unanimity. On 24 May 1911, O'Malley came down on the side of the majority of the board with the design by Walter Burley Griffin and Marion Mahony Griffin of Chicago, Illinois, United States, being declared the winner. Second was Eliel Saarinen of Finland and third was Alfred Agache of Brazil but resident in Paris, France. O'Malley then appointed a six-member board to advise him on the implementation of the winning design. On 25 November 1912, the board advised that it could not support the Griffins' plan in its entirety and suggested an alternative plan of its own devising. This plan ostensibly incorporated the best features of the three place-getting designs as well as of a fourth design by H. Caswell, R.C.G. Coulter and W. Scott-Griffiths of Sydney, the rights to which it had purchased. It was this composite plan that was endorsed by Parliament and given formal approval by O'Malley on 10 January 1913. However, it was the Griffin plan which was ultimately proceeded with. In 1913, Walter Burley Griffin was appointed Federal Capital Director of Design and Construction and construction began. On 23 February, King O'Malley drove the first peg in the construction of the future capital city.

In 1912, the government invited suggestions from the public as to the name of the future city. Almost 750 names were suggested. At midday on 12 March 1913, Lady Denman, the wife of Governor-General Lord Denman, announced that the city would be named "Canberra" at a ceremony at Kurrajong Hill, which has since become Capital Hill and the site of the present Parliament House. Canberra Day is a public holiday observed in the ACT on the second Monday in March to celebrate the founding of Canberra. After the ceremony, bureaucratic disputes hindered Griffin's work; a Royal Commission in 1916 ruled his authority had been usurped by certain officials and his original plan was reinstated. Griffin's relationship with the Australian authorities was strained and a lack of funding meant that by the time he was fired in 1920, little work had been done. By this time, Griffin had revised his plan, overseen the earthworks of major avenues and established the Glenloch Cork Plantation.

=== Development throughout 20th century ===
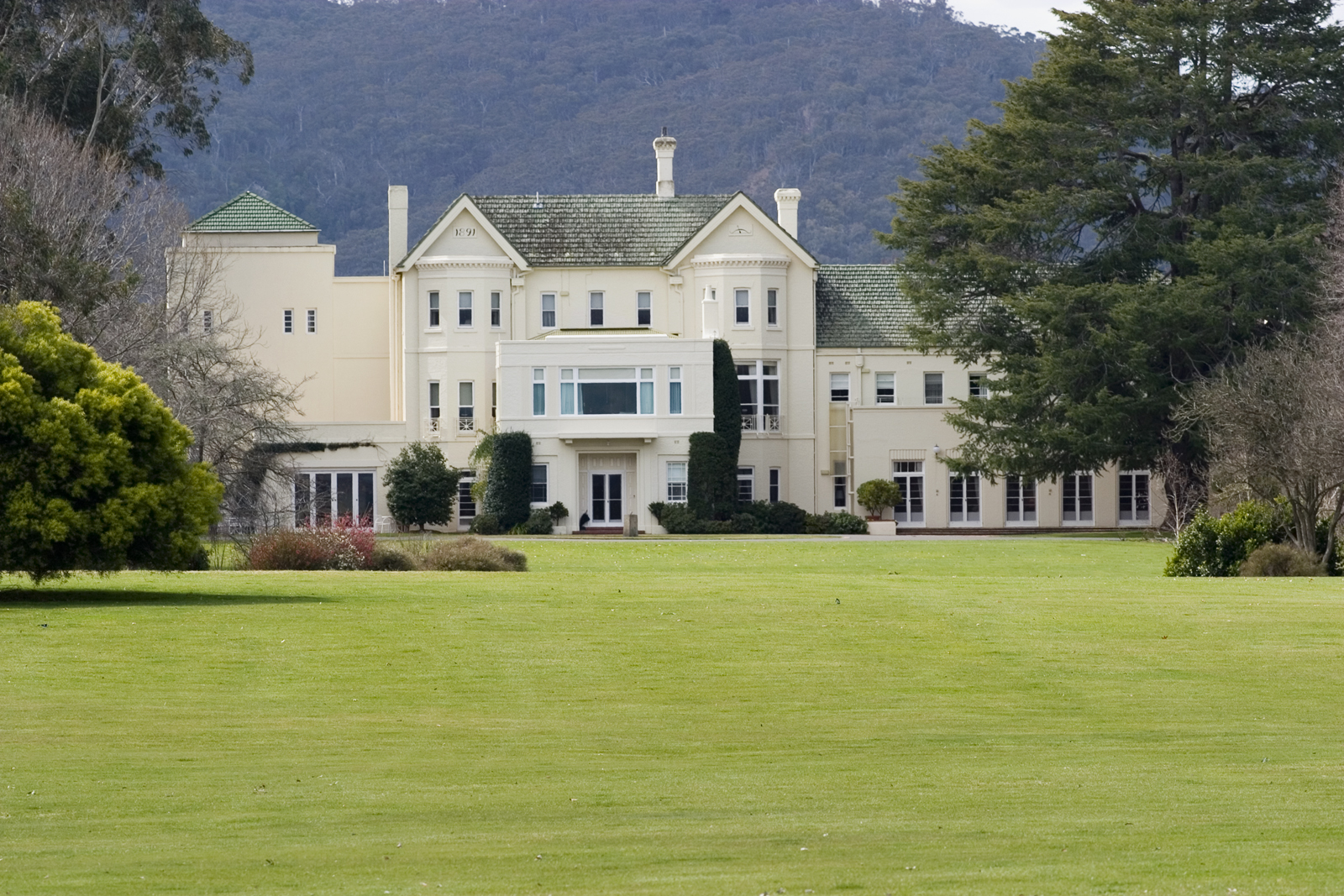
Canberra's Government House, the official residence of the Governor-General of Australia

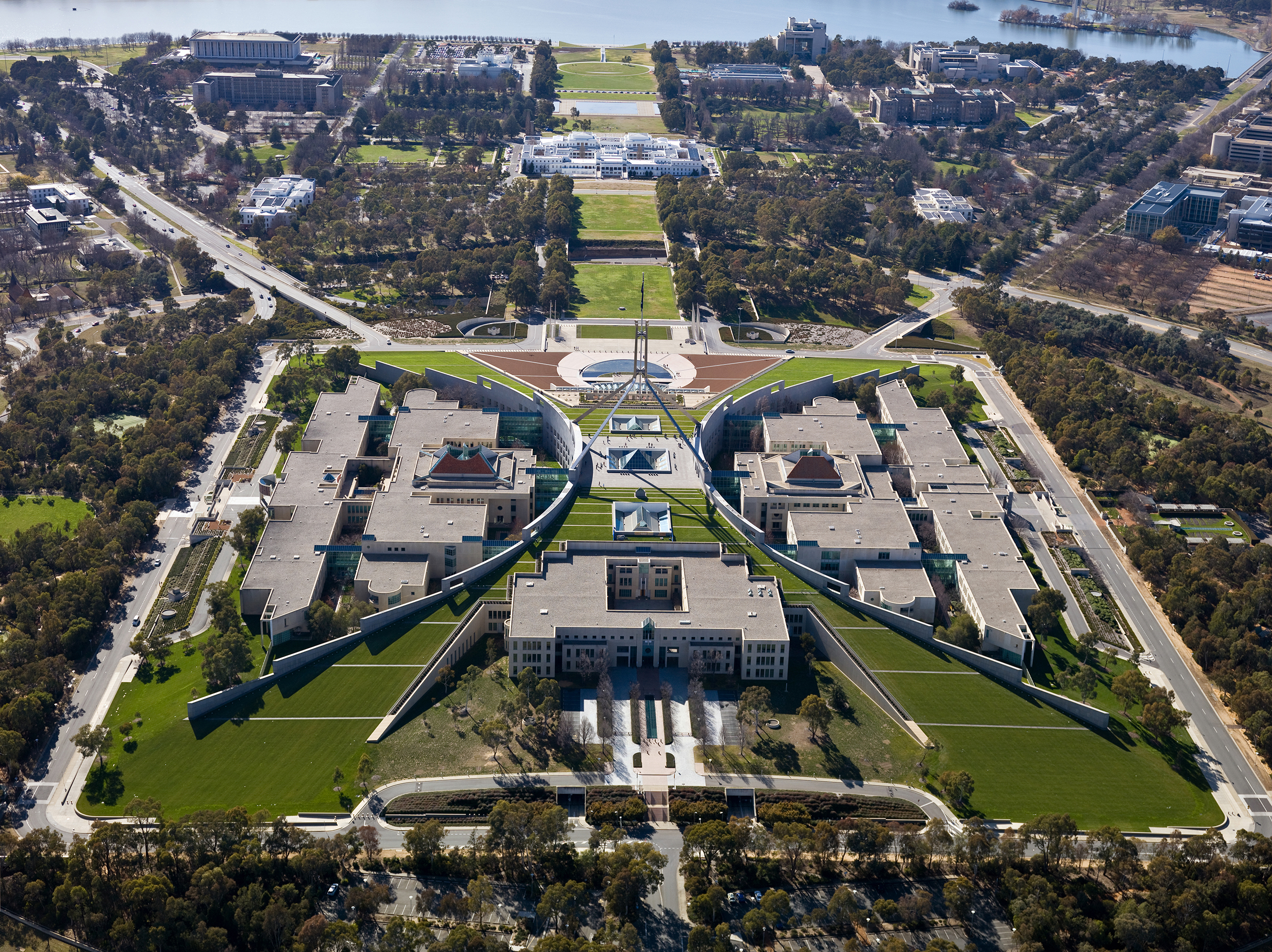
The land-axis aligns Parliament House (foreground) with Old Parliament House (background)

The Commonwealth government purchased the pastoral property of Yarralumla in 1913 to provide an official residence for the Governor-General of Australia in the new capital. Renovations began in 1925 to enlarge and modernise the property. In 1927, the property was officially dubbed Government House. On 9 May that year, the Commonwealth parliament moved to Canberra with the opening of the Provisional Parliament House. The Prime Minister Stanley Bruce had officially taken up residence in The Lodge a few days earlier. Planned development of the city slowed significantly during the depression of the 1930s and during World War II. Some projects planned for that time, including Roman Catholic and Anglican cathedrals, were never completed. (Nevertheless, in 1973 the Roman Catholic parish church of St. Christopher was remodelled into St Christopher's Cathedral, Manuka, serving the Archdiocese of Canberra and Goulburn. It is the only cathedral in Canberra.)

From 1920 to 1957, three bodies — successively the Federal Capital Advisory Committee, the Federal Capital Commission, and the National Capital Planning and Development Committee — continued to plan the further expansion of Canberra in the absence of Griffin. However, they were only advisory and development decisions were made without consulting them, which increased inefficiency.

The largest event in Canberra up to World War II was the 24th Meeting of ANZAAS in January 1939. The Canberra Times described it as "a signal event ... in the history of this, the world's youngest capital city". The city's accommodation was not nearly sufficient to house the 1,250 delegates and a tent city had to be set up on the banks of the Molonglo River. One of the prominent speakers was H. G. Wells, who was a guest of the Governor-General Lord Gowrie for a week. This event coincided with a heatwave across south-eastern Australia during which the temperature in Canberra reached 108.5 degrees Fahrenheit (42.5 Celsius) on 11 January. On Friday, 13 January, the Black Friday bushfires caused 71 deaths in Victoria and Wells accompanied the Governor-General on his tour of areas threatened by fires.

Immediately after the end of the war, Canberra was criticised for resembling a village and its disorganised collection of buildings was deemed ugly. Canberra was often derisively described as "several suburbs in search of a city". Prime Minister Sir Robert Menzies regarded the state of the national capital as an embarrassment. Over time his attitude changed from one of contempt to that of championing its development. He fired two ministers charged with the development of the city for poor performance. Menzies remained in office for over a decade and in that time the development of the capital sped up rapidly. The population grew by more than 50 per cent in every five-year period from 1955 to 1975. Several Government departments, together with public servants, were moved to Canberra from Melbourne following the war. Government housing projects were undertaken to accommodate the city's growing population.

The National Capital Development Commission (NCDC) formed in 1957 with executive powers and ended four decades of disputes over the shape and design of Lake Burley Griffin — the centrepiece of Griffin's design — and construction was completed in 1964 after four years of work. The completion of the lake finally laid the platform for the development of Griffin's Parliamentary Triangle. Since the initial construction of the lake, various buildings of national importance have been constructed on its shores.

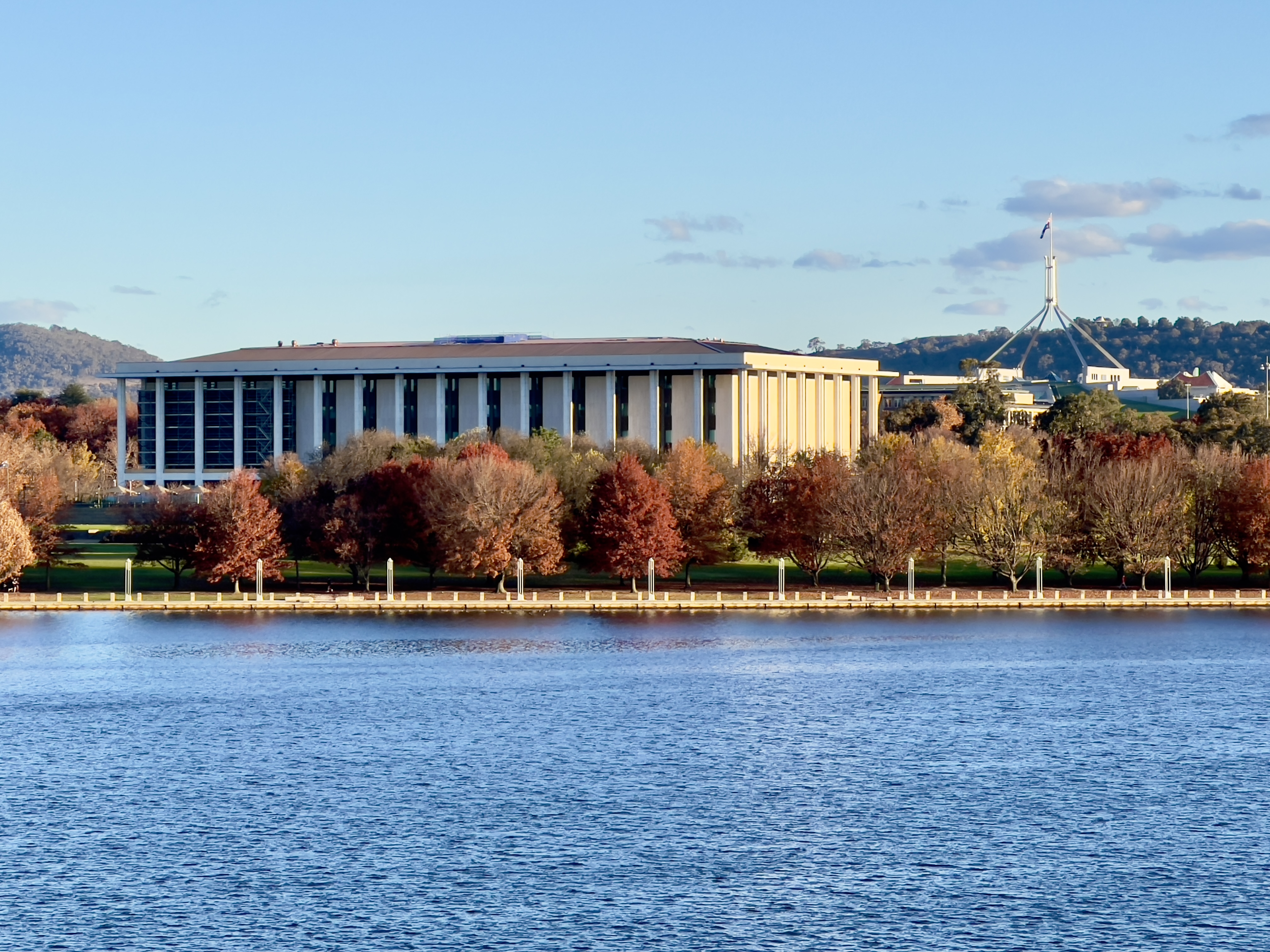
Various civic landmarks line Lake Burley Griffin. Pictured is the National Library and Parliament House (background)

The newly built Australian National University was expanded and sculptures as well as monuments were built. A new National Library was constructed within the Parliamentary Triangle, followed by the High Court and the National Gallery. Suburbs in Canberra Central (often referred to as North Canberra and South Canberra) were further developed in the 1950s and urban development in the districts of Woden Valley and Belconnen commenced in the mid and late 1960s respectively, followed by the district of Tuggeranong in the mid-1970s. Many of the new suburbs were named after Australian politicians such as Barton, Deakin, Reid, Braddon, Curtin, Chifley and Parkes.

On 9 May 1988, a larger and permanent Parliament House was opened on Capital Hill as part of Australia's bicentenary celebrations. The Commonwealth Parliament moved there from the Provisional Parliament House, now known as Old Parliament House.

=== Self-government ===
In December 1988, the Australian Capital Territory was granted full self-government by the Commonwealth Parliament, a step proposed as early as 1965. Following the first election on 4 March 1989, a 17-member Legislative Assembly sat at temporary offices at 1 Constitution Avenue, Civic, on 11 May 1989. Permanent premises were opened on London Circuit in 1994. The Australian Labor Party formed the ACT's first government, led by the Chief Minister Rosemary Follett, who made history as Australia's first female head of government. The 1990s also saw urban development begin in the district of Gungahlin in the far north of the ACT.

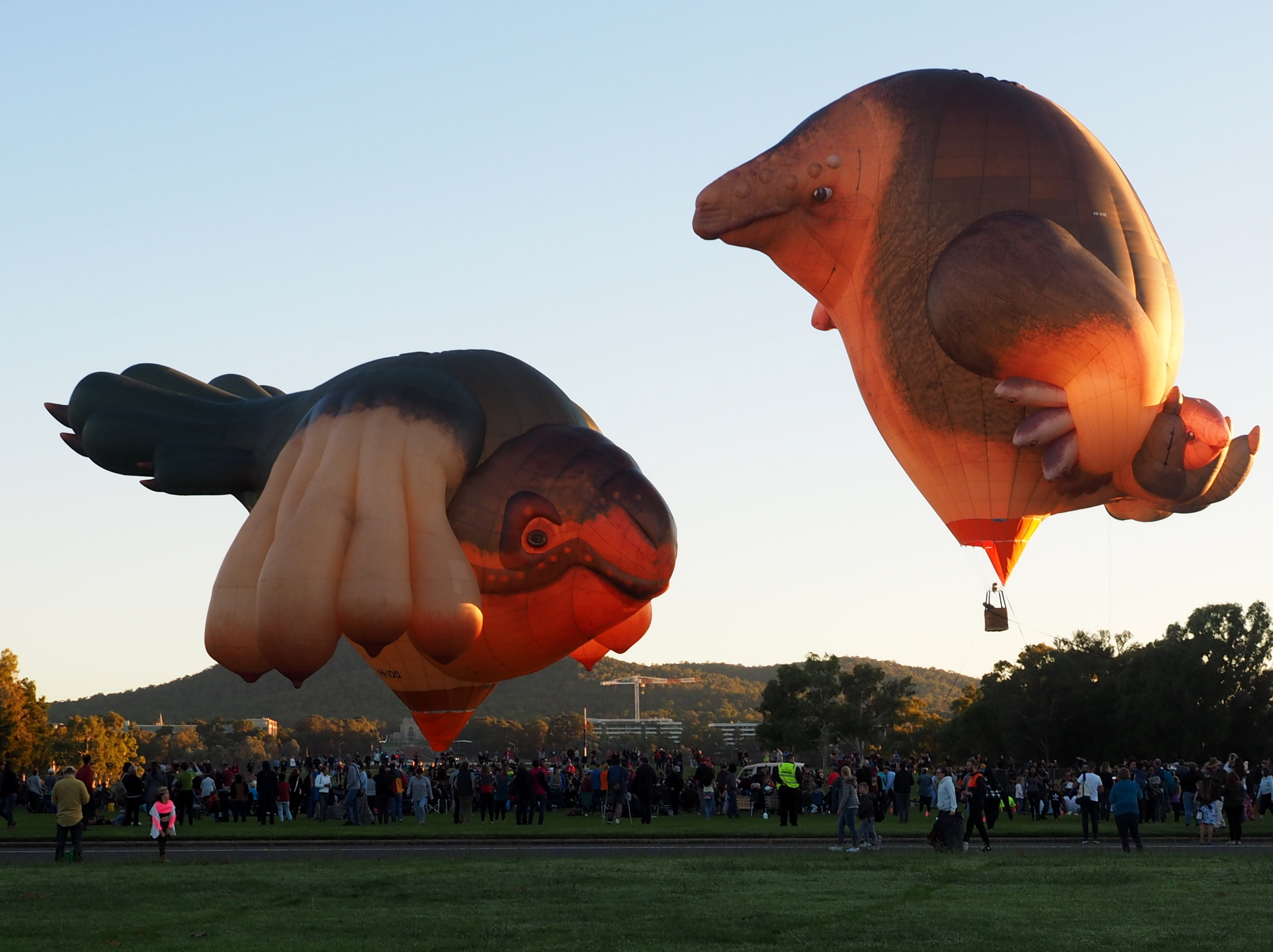
The Skywhale and Skywhalepapa in 2021

Parts of Canberra were engulfed by bushfires on 18 January 2003 that killed four people, injured 435 and destroyed more than 500 homes as well as the major research telescopes of Australian National University's Mount Stromlo Observatory.

Throughout 2013, several events celebrated the 100th anniversary of the naming of Canberra. On 11 March 2014, the last day of the centennial year, the Canberra Centenary Column was unveiled in City Hill. Other works included The Skywhale, a hot air balloon designed by the sculptor Patricia Piccinini, and StellrScope by visual media artist Eleanor Gates-Stuart. On 7 February 2021, The Skywhale was joined by Skywhalepapa to create a Skywhale family, an event marked by Skywhale-themed pastries and beer produced by local companies as well as an art pop song entitled "We are the Skywhales".

In 2014, Canberra was named the best city to live in the world by the Organisation for Economic Co-operation and Development, and was named the third best city to visit in the world by Lonely Planet in 2017.

== Geography ==
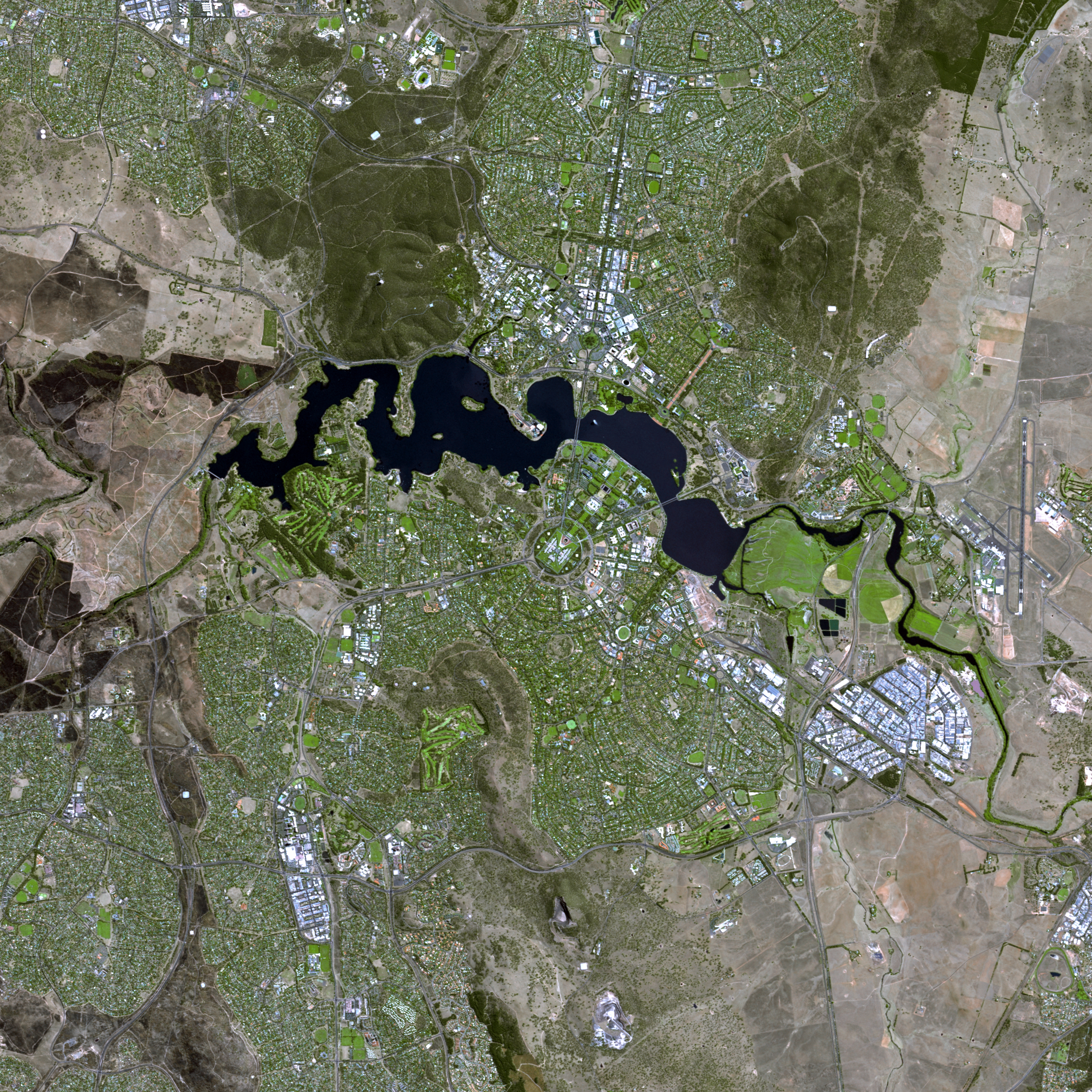
The Canberra region seen from space

Canberra is located near the Brindabella Ranges (part of the Australian Alps), approximately 150 km (93 mi) inland from Australia's east coast. Canberra is not incorporated, but its urban environs, which include a large part of the ACT east of the Murrumbidgee River, have an elevation of approximately 580 m (1,900 ft) AHD; the highest point near the built up area is Mount Majura at 888 m (2,913 ft). Other low mountains include Mount Taylor 855 m (2,805 ft), Mount Ainslie 843 m (2,766 ft), Mount Mugga Mugga 812 m (2,664 ft) and Black Mountain 812 m (2,664 ft).

The native forest in the Canberra region was almost wholly eucalypt species and provided a resource for fuel and domestic purposes. By the early 1960s, logging had depleted the eucalypt, and concern about water quality led to the forests being closed. Interest in forestry began in 1915 with trials of a number of species including Pinus radiata on the slopes of Mount Stromlo. Since then, plantations have been expanded, with the benefit of reducing erosion in the Cotter catchment, and the forests are also popular recreation areas.

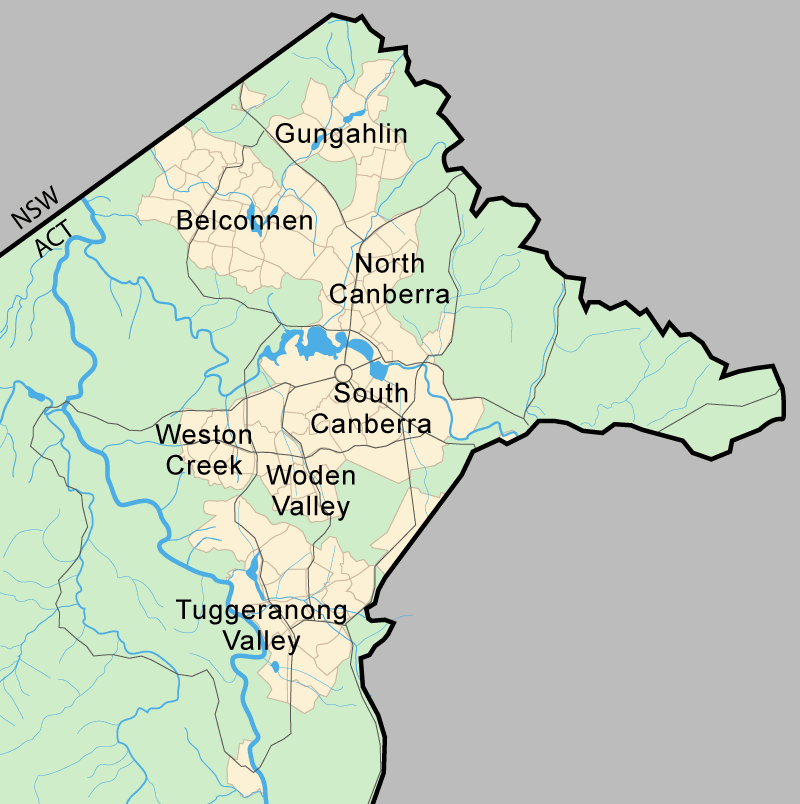
The location of Canberra within the ACT. Canberra's main districts are shown in yellow: Canberra Central (marked as North Canberra and South Canberra), Woden Valley, Belconnen, Weston Creek, Tuggeranong, and Gungahlin.

The urban environs of Canberra straddle the Ginninderra plain, Molonglo plain, the Limestone plain, and the Tuggeranong plain (Isabella's Plain). The Molonglo River which flows across the Molonglo plain has been dammed to form the national capital's iconic feature Lake Burley Griffin. The Molonglo then flows into the Murrumbidgee north-west of Canberra, which in turn flows north-west toward the New South Wales town of Yass. The Queanbeyan River joins the Molonglo River at Oaks Estate just within the ACT.

A number of creeks, including Jerrabomberra and Yarralumla Creeks, flow into the Molonglo and Murrumbidgee. Two of these creeks, the Ginninderra and Tuggeranong, have similarly been dammed to form Lakes Ginninderra and Tuggeranong. Until recently the Molonglo River had a history of sometimes calamitous floods; the area was a flood plain prior to the filling of Lake Burley Griffin.

=== Climate ===
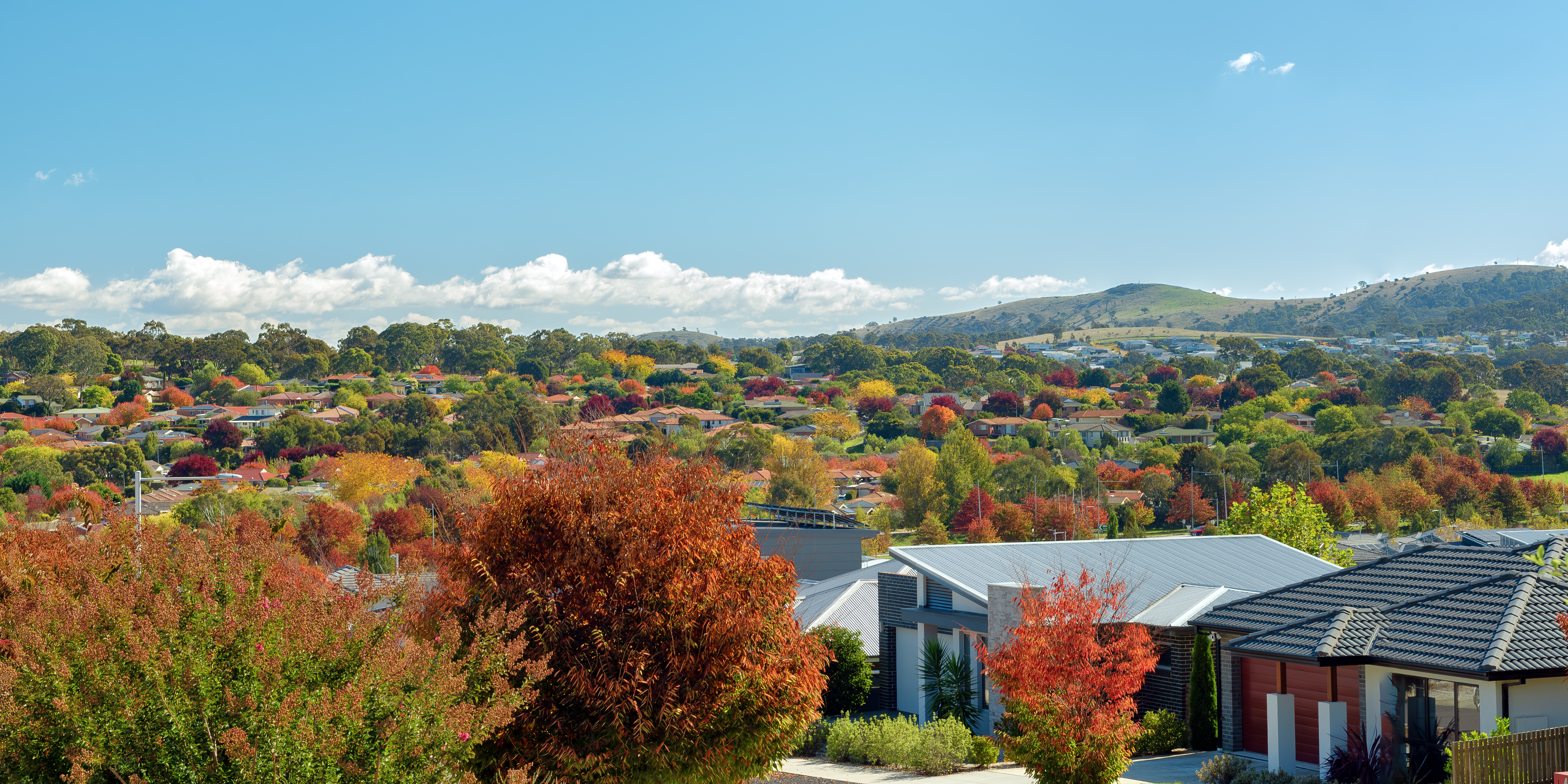
Autumn foliage in Canberra

Under the Köppen-Geiger classification, Canberra has an oceanic climate (Cfb). In January, the warmest month, the average high is approximately 29 °C (84 °F); in July, the coldest month, the average high drops to approximately 12 °C (54 °F).

Frost is common in the winter months. Snow is rare in the CBD (central business district) due to being on the leeward (eastern) side of the dividing range, but the surrounding areas get annual snowfall through winter and often the snow-capped Brindabella Range can be seen from the CBD. The last significant snowfall in the city centre was in 1968.

The highest recorded maximum temperature was 44.0 °C (111.2 °F) on 4 January 2020. Winter 2011 was Canberra's warmest winter on record, approximately 2 °C (4 °F) above the average temperature. The lowest recorded minimum temperature was −10.0 °C (14.0 °F) on the morning of 11 July 1971. Light snow falls only once in every few years, and is usually not widespread and quickly dissipates.

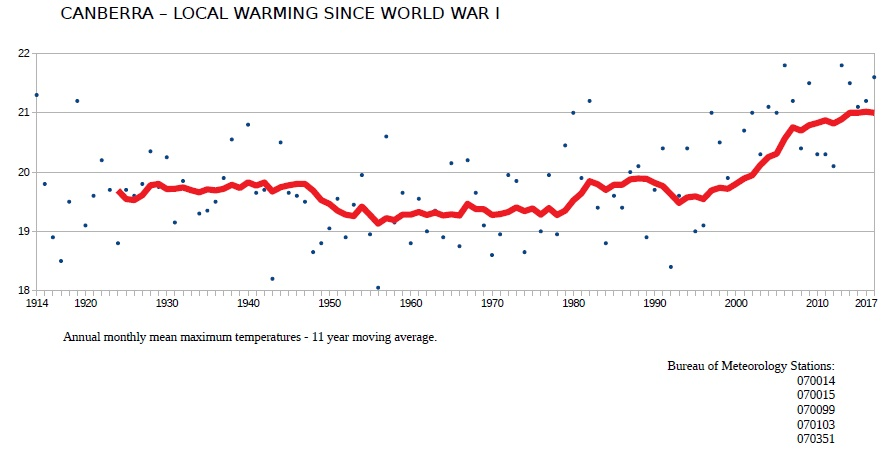
Long-term temperature increase in Canberra

Canberra is protected from the west by the Brindabellas which create a strong rain shadow in Canberra's valleys. Canberra gets 100.4 clear days annually. Annual rainfall is the third lowest of the capital cities (after Adelaide and Hobart) and is spread fairly evenly over the seasons, with late spring bringing the highest rainfall. Thunderstorms occur mostly between October and April, owing to the effect of summer and the mountains.

The area is generally sheltered from a westerly wind, though strong northwesterlies can develop. A cool, vigorous afternoon easterly change, colloquially referred to as a 'sea-breeze' or the 'Braidwood Butcher', is common during the summer months and often exceeds 40 km/h in the city. Canberra is also less humid than the nearby coastal areas.

Canberra was severely affected by smoke haze during the 2019/2020 bushfires. On 1 January 2020, Canberra had the worst air quality of any major city in the world, with an AQI of 7700 (USAQI 949).

Climate data for Canberra Airport Comparison (1991–2010 averages, extremes 1939–2023); 578 m AMSL; 35.30° S, 149.20° E
Month	Jan	Feb	Mar	Apr	May	Jun	Jul	Aug	Sep	Oct	Nov	Dec	Year
Record high °C (°F)	44.0 (111.2)	42.7 (108.9)	37.5 (99.5)	32.6 (90.7)	24.5 (76.1)	20.1 (68.2)	19.7 (67.5)	24.0 (75.2)	30.2 (86.4)	32.7 (90.9)	39.9 (103.8)	41.6 (106.9)	44.0 (111.2)
Mean maximum °C (°F)	37.2 (99.0)	34.8 (94.6)	31.8 (89.2)	26.3 (79.3)	21.6 (70.9)	17.3 (63.1)	15.8 (60.4)	18.8 (65.8)	23.1 (73.6)	27.4 (81.3)	32.0 (89.6)	35.0 (95.0)	37.9 (100.2)
Mean daily maximum °C (°F)	28.8 (83.8)	27.8 (82.0)	24.9 (76.8)	20.7 (69.3)	16.6 (61.9)	12.9 (55.2)	12.1 (53.8)	13.8 (56.8)	16.8 (62.2)	20.1 (68.2)	23.4 (74.1)	26.5 (79.7)	20.4 (68.7)
Daily mean °C (°F)	21.4 (70.5)	20.8 (69.4)	17.9 (64.2)	13.7 (56.7)	10.0 (50.0)	7.3 (45.1)	6.2 (43.2)	7.5 (45.5)	10.4 (50.7)	13.4 (56.1)	16.5 (61.7)	19.3 (66.7)	13.7 (56.7)
Mean daily minimum °C (°F)	14.0 (57.2)	13.8 (56.8)	10.9 (51.6)	6.6 (43.9)	3.4 (38.1)	1.6 (34.9)	0.3 (32.5)	1.2 (34.2)	4.0 (39.2)	6.7 (44.1)	9.6 (49.3)	12.1 (53.8)	7.0 (44.6)
Mean minimum °C (°F)	7.7 (45.9)	7.7 (45.9)	4.1 (39.4)	−0.3 (31.5)	−3.1 (26.4)	−5.0 (23.0)	−5.2 (22.6)	−4.7 (23.5)	−2.2 (28.0)	−0.1 (31.8)	2.2 (36.0)	5.3 (41.5)	−5.9 (21.4)
Record low °C (°F)	1.6 (34.9)	2.8 (37.0)	−1.1 (30.0)	−3.7 (25.3)	−7.5 (18.5)	−8.5 (16.7)	−10.0 (14.0)	−8.5 (16.7)	−6.9 (19.6)	−3.4 (25.9)	−2.3 (27.9)	−0.3 (31.5)	−10.0 (14.0)
Average precipitation mm (inches)	61.3 (2.41)	55.2 (2.17)	37.6 (1.48)	27.3 (1.07)	31.5 (1.24)	50.0 (1.97)	44.3 (1.74)	43.1 (1.70)	55.8 (2.20)	50.9 (2.00)	68.4 (2.69)	54.1 (2.13)	579.5 (22.81)
Average precipitation days (≥ 0.2 mm)	6.8	6.7	5.7	5.4	6.3	9.7	10.0	8.5	9.8	9.1	10.2	7.2	95.4
Average afternoon relative humidity (%)	37	40	42	46	54	60	58	52	49	47	41	37	47
Average dew point °C (°F)	8.6 (47.5)	9.8 (49.6)	8.5 (47.3)	6.4 (43.5)	5.0 (41.0)	3.5 (38.3)	2.3 (36.1)	2.1 (35.8)	3.7 (38.7)	5.4 (41.7)	6.3 (43.3)	6.9 (44.4)	5.7 (42.3)
Mean monthly sunshine hours	294.5	254.3	251.1	219.0	186.0	156.0	179.8	217.0	231.0	266.6	267.0	291.4	2,813.7
Source 1: Climate averages for Canberra Airport Comparison (1939–2010); averages given are for 1991–2010
Source 2: Records from Canberra Airport for more recent extremes

=== Urban structure ===
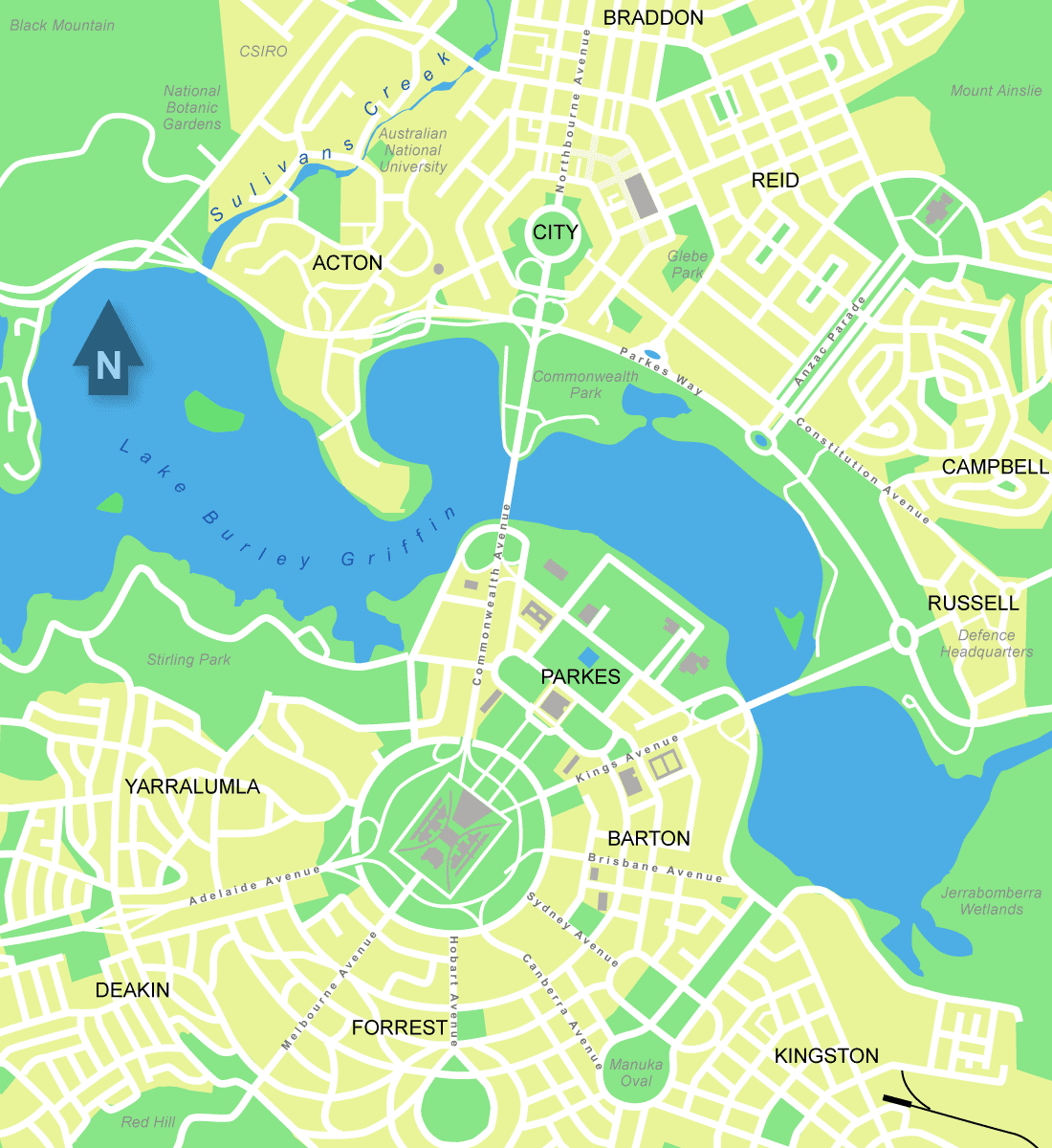
Inner Canberra demonstrates some aspects of the Griffin plan, in particular the Parliamentary Triangle.

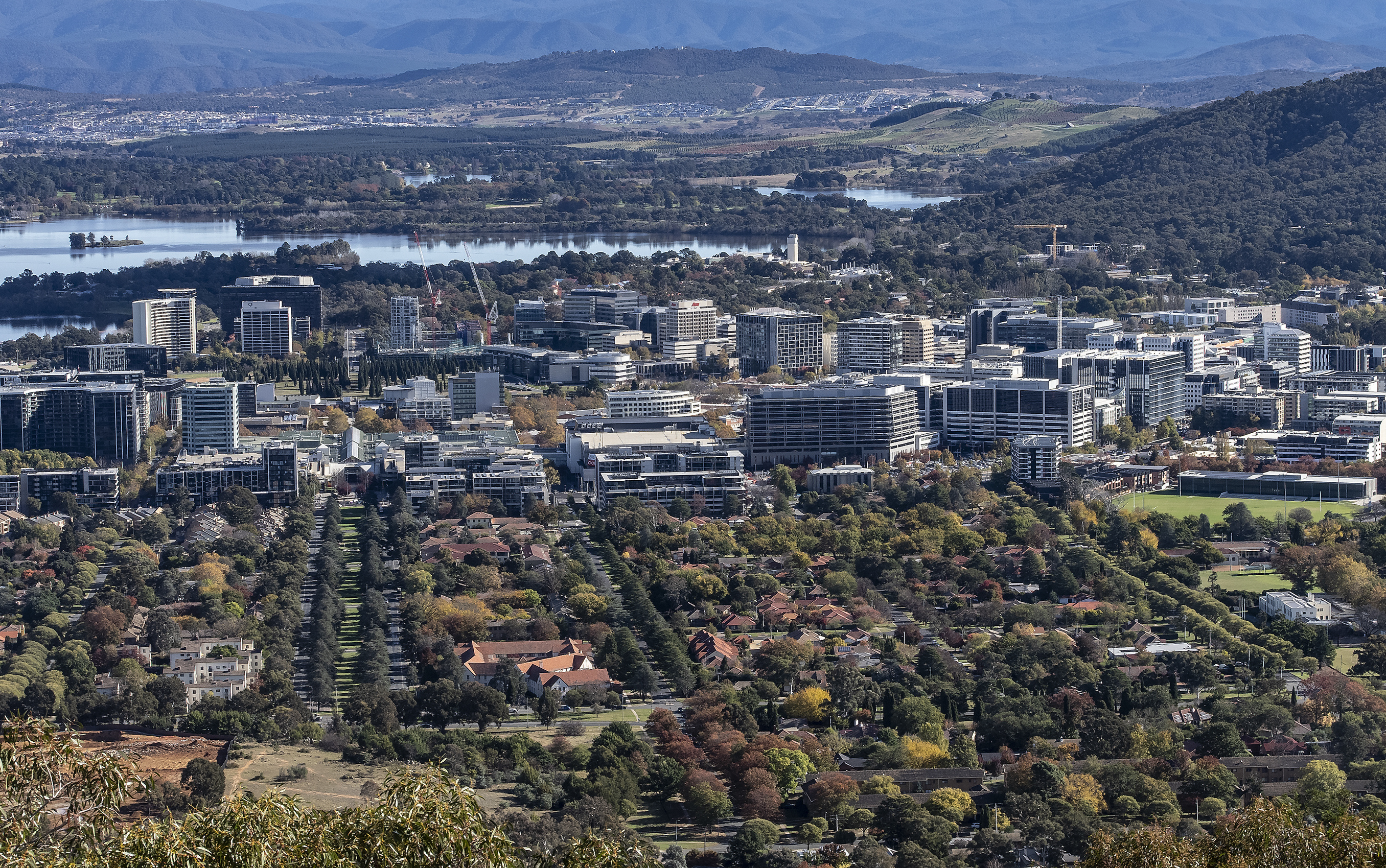
An aerial view of the Civic Centre from Mount Ainslie

Unusual among Australian cities, Canberra is an entirely planned city, grounded in a design by American architects Walter Burley Griffin and Marion Mahony Griffin. Within the central area of the city near Lake Burley Griffin, major roads follow a wheel-and-spoke pattern rather than a grid. Griffin's proposal had an abundance of geometric patterns, including concentric hexagonal and octagonal streets emanating from several radii. However, the outer areas of the city, built later, are not laid out geometrically.

Lake Burley Griffin was deliberately designed so that the orientation of the components was related to various topographical landmarks in Canberra. The lakes stretch from east to west and divided the city in two; a land axis perpendicular to the central basin stretches from Capital Hill—the eventual location of the new Parliament House on a mound on the southern side—north northeast across the central basin to the northern banks along Anzac Parade to the Australian War Memorial. This was designed so that looking from Capital Hill, the War Memorial stood directly at the foot of Mount Ainslie. At the southwestern end of the land axis was Bimberi Peak, the highest mountain in the ACT, approximately 52 km (32 mi) south west of Canberra.

The straight edge of the circular segment that formed the central basin of Lake Burley Griffin was perpendicular to the land axis and designated the water axis, and it extended northwest towards Black Mountain. A line parallel to the water axis, on the northern side of the city, was designated the municipal axis. The municipal axis became the location of Constitution Avenue, which links City Hill in Civic Centre and both Market Centre and the Defence precinct on Russell Hill. Commonwealth Avenue and Kings Avenue were to run from the southern side from Capital Hill to City Hill and Market Centre on the north respectively, and they formed the western and eastern edges of the central basin. The area enclosed by the three avenues was known as the Parliamentary Triangle, and formed the centrepiece of Griffin's work.

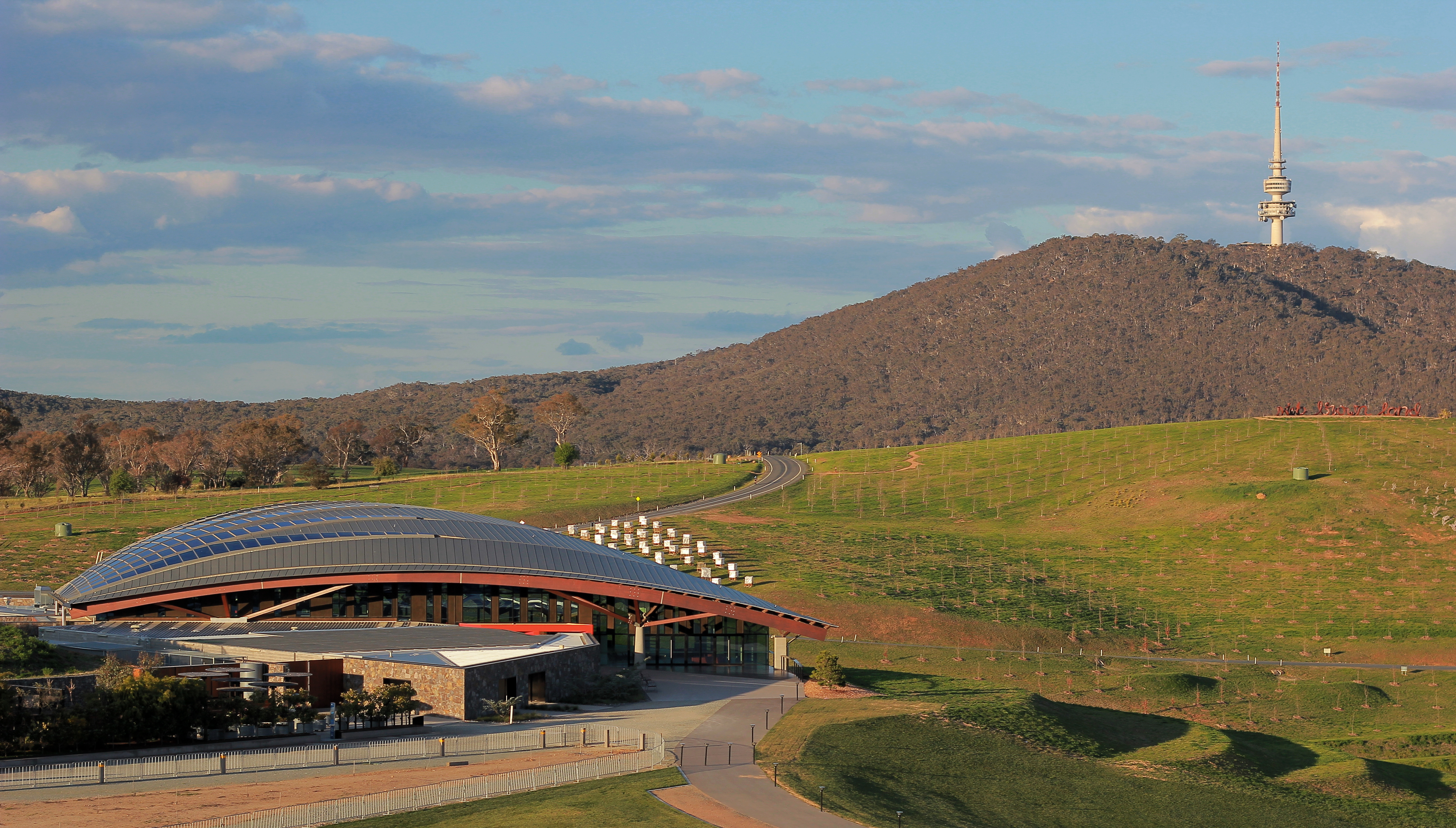
Black Mountain with the landmark Telstra Tower on the right and the National Arboretum in the foreground

The Griffins assigned spiritual values to Mount Ainslie, Black Mountain, and Red Hill and originally planned to cover each of these in flowers. That way each hill would be covered with a single, primary colour which represented its spiritual value. This part of their plan never came to fruition, as World War I slowed construction and planning disputes led to Griffin's dismissal by Prime Minister Billy Hughes after the war ended.

The urban areas of Canberra are organised into a hierarchy of districts, town centres, group centres, local suburbs as well as other industrial areas and villages. There are seven residential districts, each of which is divided into smaller suburbs, and most of which have a town centre which is the focus of commercial and social activities. The districts were settled in the following chronological order:

- Canberra Central, mostly settled in the 1920s and 1930s, with expansion up to the 1960s.
- Woden Valley, first settled in 1964.
- Belconnen, first settled in 1966.
- Weston Creek, first settled in 1969.
- Tuggeranong, first settled in 1974.
- Gungahlin, first settled in 1991.
- Molonglo Valley, development began in 2010.

The Canberra Central district is substantially based on Walter Burley Griffin's designs. In 1967 the then National Capital Development Commission adopted the "Y Plan" which laid out future urban development in Canberra around a series of central shopping and commercial area known as the 'town centres' linked by freeways, the layout of which roughly resembled the shape of the letter Y, with Tuggeranong at the base of the Y and Belconnen and Gungahlin located at the ends of the arms of the Y.

Development in Canberra has been closely regulated by government, both through planning processes and the use of crown lease terms that have tightly limited the use of parcels of land. Land in the ACT is held on 99-year crown leases from the national government, although most leases are now administered by the Territory government. There have been persistent calls for constraints on development to be liberalised, but also voices in support of planning consistent with the original 'bush capital' and 'urban forest' ideals that underpin Canberra's design.

Many of Canberra's suburbs are named after former Prime Ministers, famous Australians, early settlers, or use Aboriginal words for their title. Street names typically follow a particular theme; for example, the streets of Duffy are named after Australian dams and reservoirs, the streets of Dunlop are named after Australian inventions, inventors and artists and the streets of Page are named after biologists and naturalists. Most diplomatic missions are located in the suburbs of Yarralumla, Deakin, and O'Malley. There are three light industrial areas: the suburbs of Fyshwick, Mitchell, and Hume.

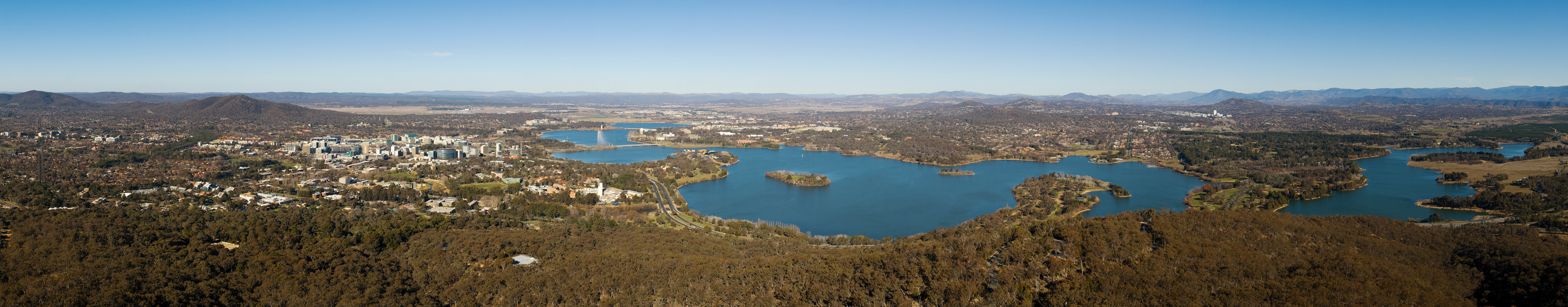
Panorama of Canberra and Lake Burley Griffin set against the backdrop of distant New South Wales, taken from the Telstra Tower

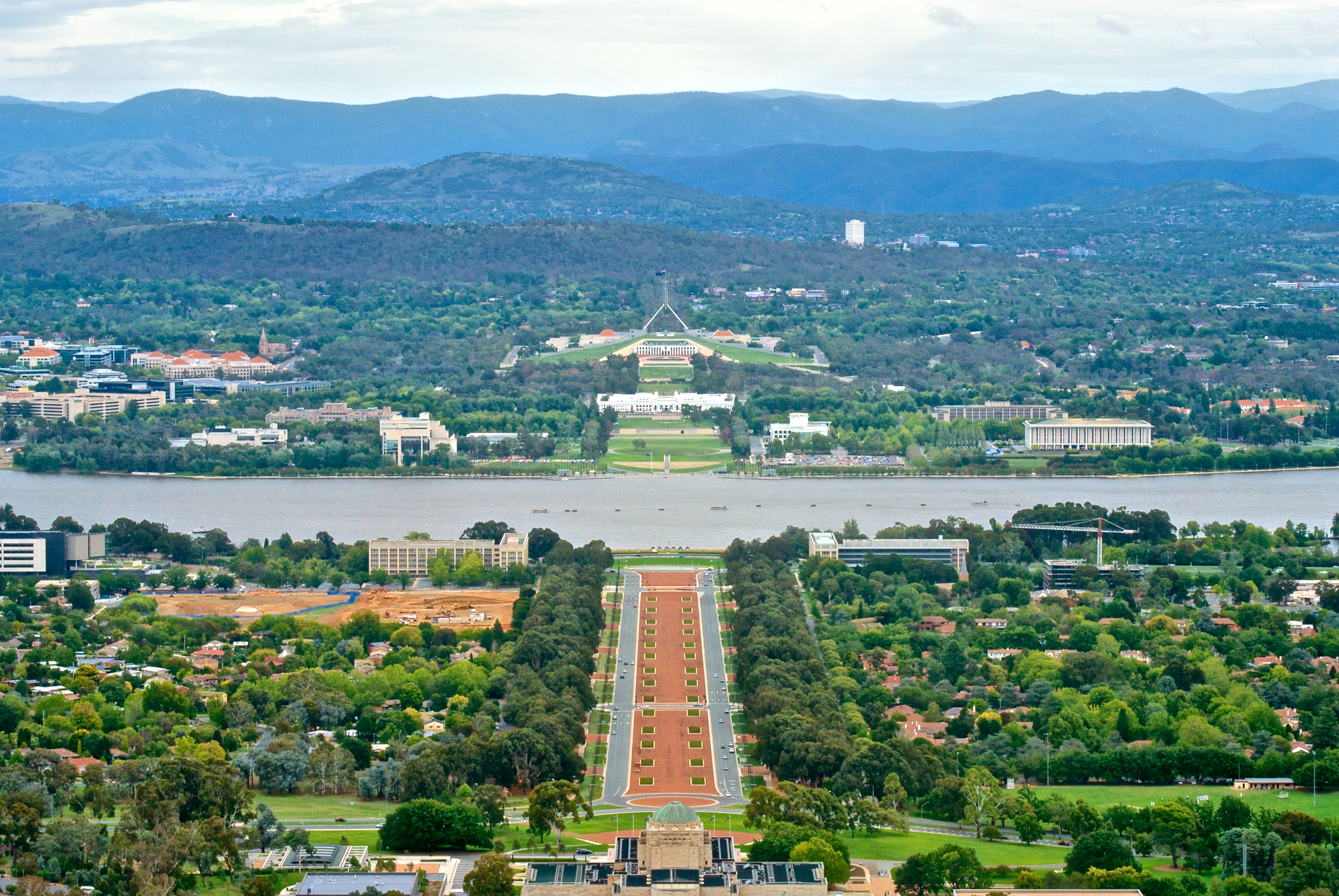
Points of Interest Looking South from Mount Ainslie

1	War Memorial
2	Anzac Parade
3	Old Parliament House
4	New Parliament House
5	National Gallery
6	High Court

7	Questacon
8	National Library
9	Edmund Barton Building
10	Brindabella Ranges
11	Lovett Tower
12	Ben Chifley Building

13	Lake Burley Griffin
14	Limestone Avenue
15	Fairbairn Avenue
16	Parkes Way
17	R G Casey Building
18	John Gorton Building

19	King Edward Terrace
20	Presbyterian Church of Saint Andrew
21	St John's Anglican Church

=== Sustainability and the environment ===
The average Canberran was responsible for 13.7 tonnes of greenhouse gases in 2005. In 2012, the ACT Government legislated greenhouse gas targets to reduce its emissions by 40 per cent from 1990 levels by 2020, 80 per cent by 2050, with no net emissions by 2060. The government announced in 2013 a target for 90% of electricity consumed in the ACT to be supplied from renewable sources by 2020, and in 2016 set an ambitious target of 100% by 2020. Canberra achieved 100% renewable electricity in 2020 and the ACT Government committed in 2024 to Canberra using 100% renewable energy in 2045.

In 1996, Canberra became the first city in the world to set a vision of no waste, proposing an ambitious target of 2010 for completion. The strategy aimed to achieve a waste-free society by 2010, through the combined efforts of industry, government and community. By early 2010, it was apparent that though it had reduced waste going to landfill, the ACT initiative's original 2010 target for absolutely zero landfill waste would be delayed or revised to meet the reality.

Plastic bags made of polyethylene polymer with a thickness of less than 35 μm were banned from retail distribution in the ACT from November 2011. The ban was introduced by the ACT Government in an effort to make Canberra more sustainable.

Of all waste produced in the ACT, 75 per cent is recycled. Average household food waste in the ACT remains above the Australian average, costing an average $641 per household per annum.

== Government and politics ==
=== Territory government ===
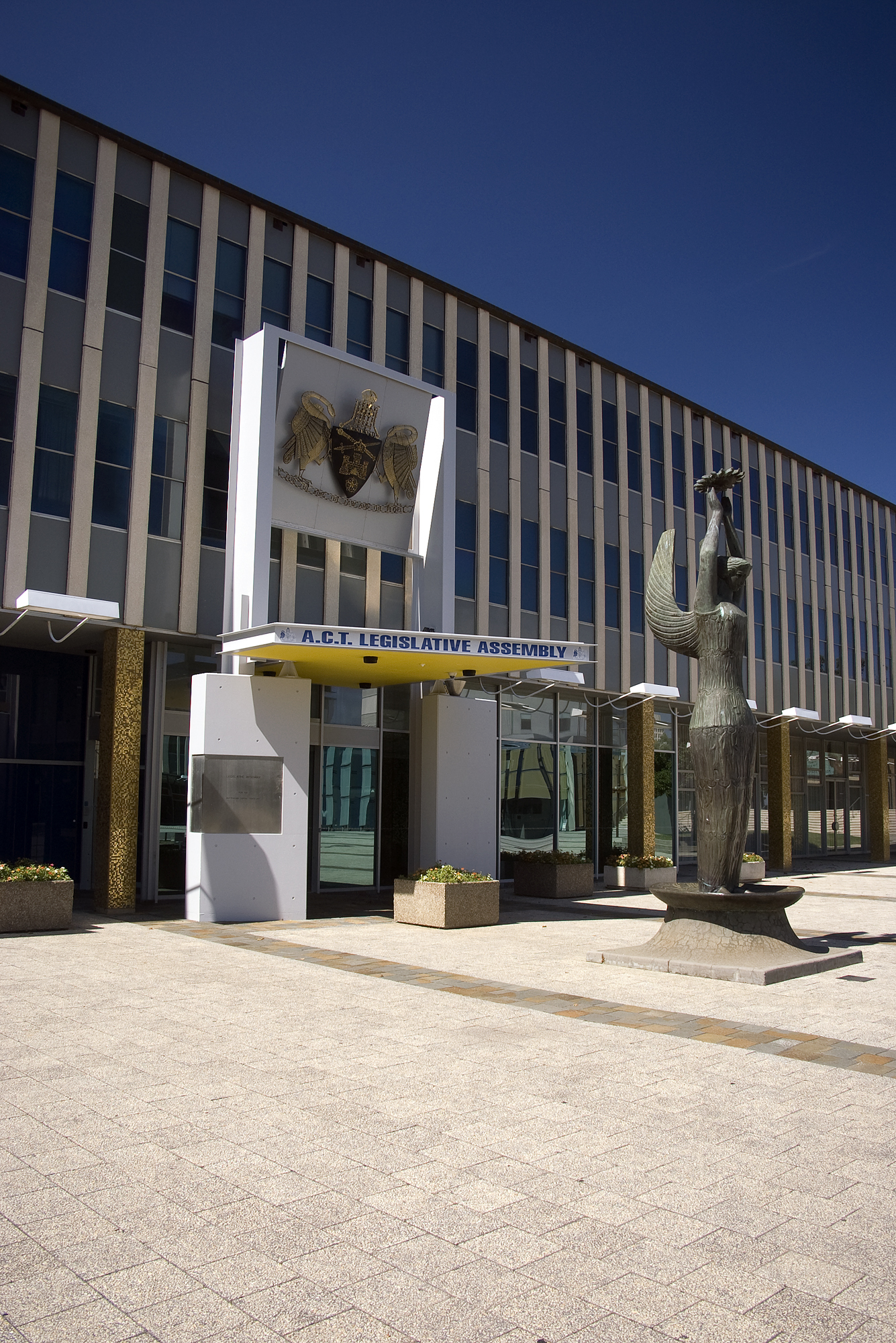
ACT Legislative Assembly and the statue Ethos (Tom Bass, 1961)

There is no local council or city government for Canberra, which thus has no precise definition. The Australian Capital Territory Legislative Assembly administers both the urban area and the rest of the Australian Capital Territory. At the 2021 census, all but 888 people were calculated to reside in the urban area of Canberra.

The assembly consists of 25 members elected from five districts using proportional representation. The five districts are Brindabella, Ginninderra, Kurrajong, Murrumbidgee and Yerrabi, which each elect five members. The Chief Minister is elected by the Members of the Legislative Assembly (MLA) and selects colleagues to serve as ministers alongside him or her in the Executive, known informally as the cabinet.

Whereas the ACT has federally been dominated by Labor, the Liberals have been able to gain some footing in the ACT Legislative Assembly and were in government during a period of 6 1/2 years from 1995 and 2001. Labor took back control of the Assembly in 2001. At the 2004 election, Chief Minister Jon Stanhope and the Labor Party won 9 of the 17 seats allowing them to form the ACT's first majority government. Since 2008, the ACT has been governed by a coalition of Labor and the Greens. As of 2022, the Chief Minister was Andrew Barr from the Australian Labor Party.

The Australian federal government retains some influence over the ACT government. In the administrative sphere, most frequently this is through the actions of the National Capital Authority which is responsible for planning and development in areas of Canberra which are considered to be of national importance or which are central to Griffin's plan for the city, such as the Parliamentary Triangle, Lake Burley Griffin, major approach and processional roads, areas where the Commonwealth retains ownership of the land or undeveloped hills and ridge-lines (which form part of the Canberra Nature Park). The national government also retains a level of control over the Territory Assembly through the provisions of the Australian Capital Territory (Self-Government) Act 1988. This federal act defines the legislative power of the ACT assembly.

=== Federal representation ===
The ACT was given its first federal parliamentary representation in 1949 when it gained a seat in the House of Representatives, the Division of Australian Capital Territory. However, until 1966, the ACT member could only vote on matters directly affecting the territory and did not count for purposes of forming government. In 1974, the ACT was allocated two Senate seats and the House of Representatives seat was divided into two. A third was created in 1996, but was abolished in 1998 because of changes to the regional demographic distribution. A third seat was recreated at a redistribution in 2018 as the Division of Bean. The House of Representatives seats have mostly been held by Labor and usually by comfortable margins. The Labor Party has held all seats at every federal election since 1980, although it lost a byelection for the Division of Canberra in 1995. The ALP and the Liberal Party held one Senate seat each until the 2022 election when Independent candidate David Pocock unseated the Liberal candidate Zed Seselja.

=== Judiciary and policing ===
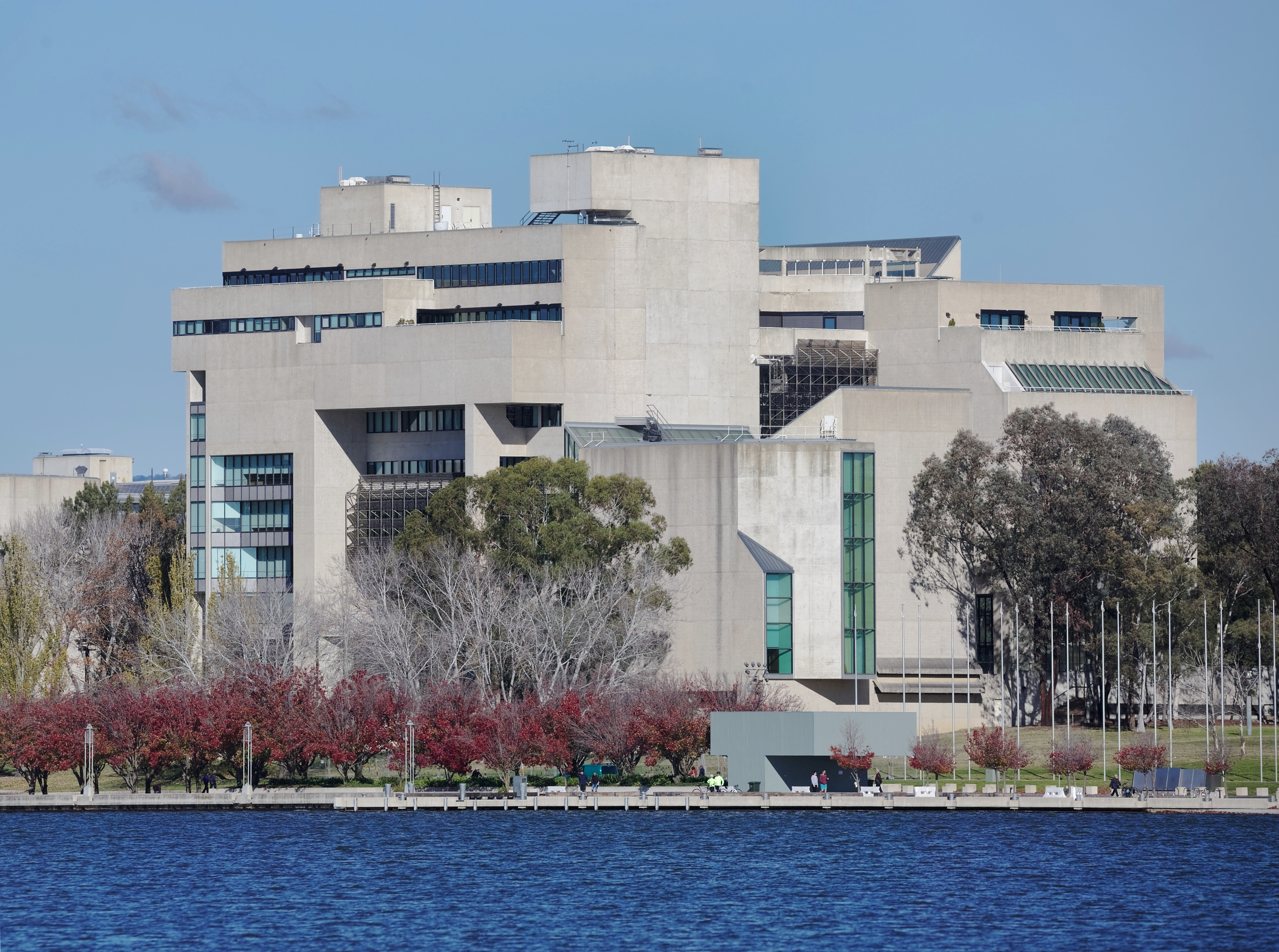
High Court of Australia

The Australian Federal Police (AFP) provides all of the constabulary services in the territory in a manner similar to state police forces, under a contractual agreement with the ACT Government, through its community policing arm, ACT Policing. People who have been charged with offences are tried either in the ACT Magistrates Court or, for more severe offences, the ACT Supreme Court. Since 2009, prisoners, including those on remand have been held at the Alexander Maconochie Centre. The ACT Civil and Administrative Tribunal deal with minor civil law actions and other various legal matters.

Canberra is often described as Australia's safest city. As of 2024, the most common crimes in the ACT were property related crimes, unlawful entry with intent and motor vehicle theft. They affected 1,449 and 920 people (305 and 193 per 100,000 persons respectively). Rates of sexual assault, 428 (89 per 100,000 persons) are also below the national average (147 per 100,000). These rates are lower than the equivalent figures for other states and the Northern Territory, except for motor vehicle theft.

== Economy ==
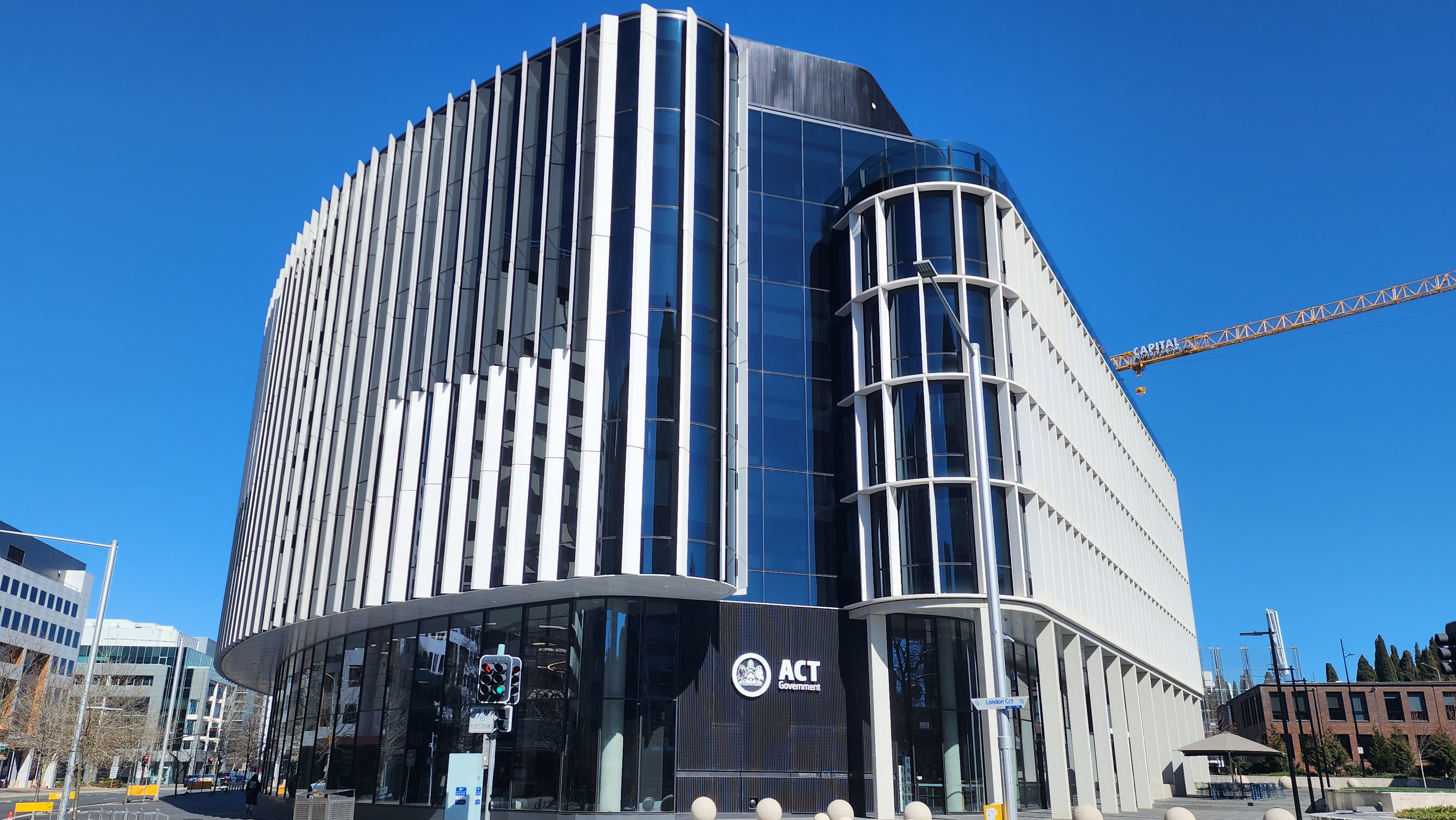
Just under a third of Canberrans are employed in the public sector, working in government departments such as the ACT Government

In November 2025, the unemployment rate in Canberra was 4.4%, almost identical with the national unemployment rate of 4.3%. Canberra had a higher median level of weekly personal income than any Australian state capital (which ranged from $762 to $881) at the 2021 census. The median level of personal income was $1,204 compared with the national average of $805. The median house price in Canberra as of December 2025 was $893,907, lower than Sydney, Brisbane, Perth and Adelaide, but higher than Melbourne, Hobart and Darwin, among capital cities. Median weekly rents in Canberra in June 2025 of $677 were similarly about midway in comparison with other state and territory capital cities.

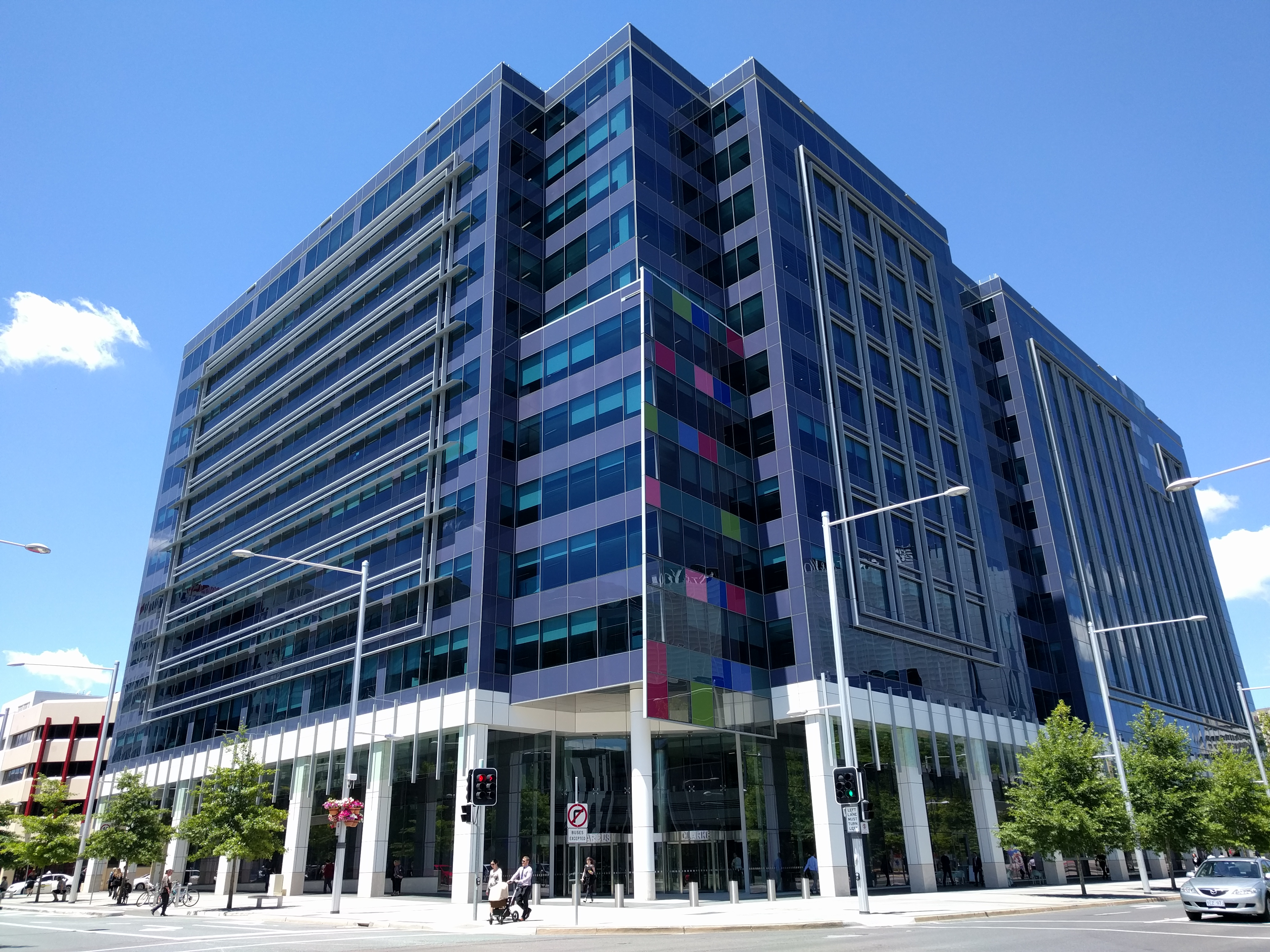
The Civic is home to various administrative departments, such as the Department of Education, Skills and Employment

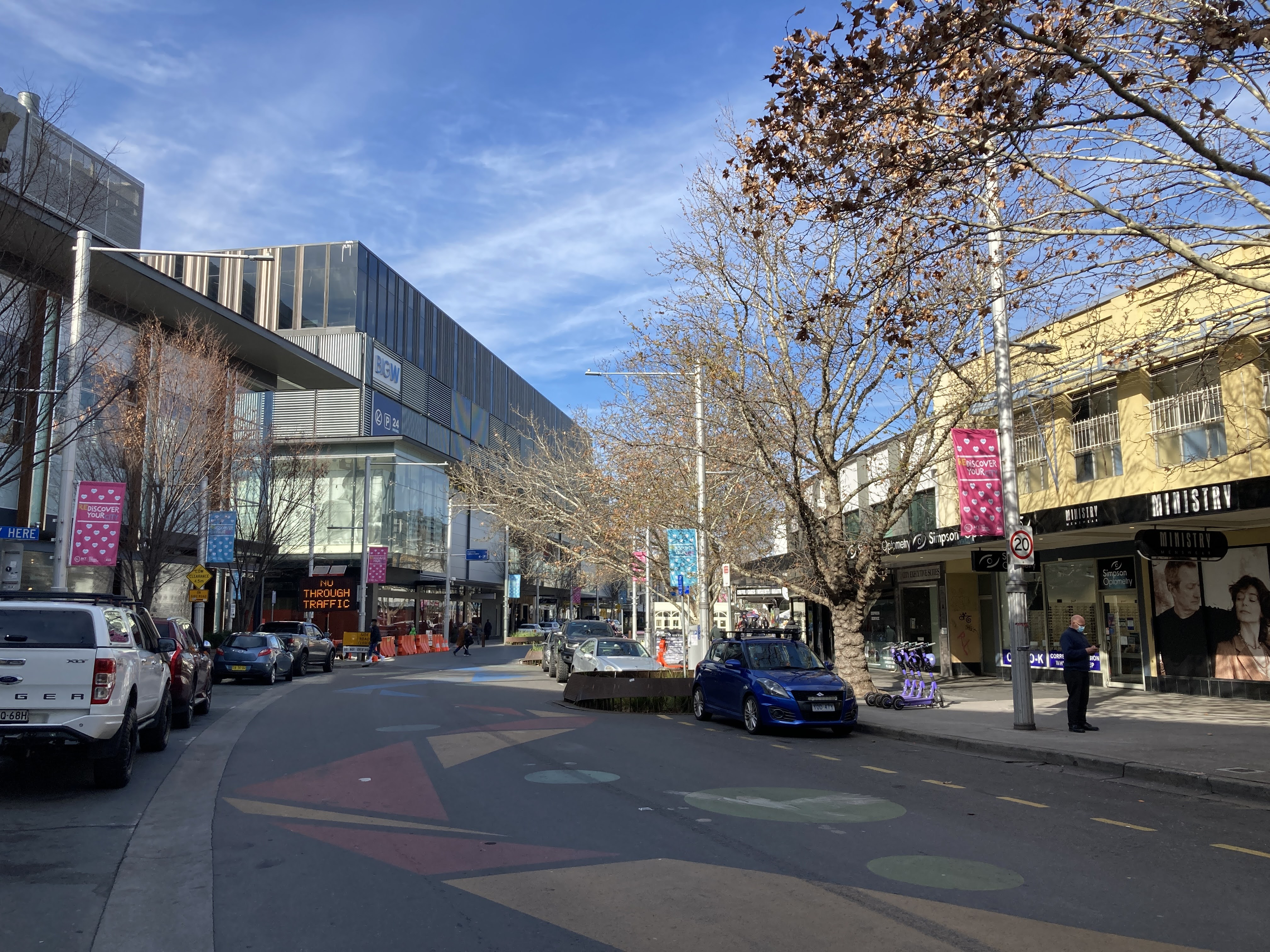
Bunda Street in Canberra's shopping district; tourism, retail and hospitality are also major employers.

The city's main industry is public administration and safety, which accounted for 27.1% of Gross Territory Product in 2018–19 and employed 32.49% of Canberra's workforce. The Australian Public Service accounted for about 25% all jobs as at November 2025. The headquarters of many Australian Public Service agencies are located in Canberra, and Canberra is also host to several Australian Defence Force establishments, most notably the Australian Defence Force headquarters and HMAS Harman, which is a naval communications centre that is being converted into a tri-service, multi-user depot. Other major sectors by employment include Health Care (10.54%), Professional Services (9.77%), Education and Training (9.64%), Retail (7.27%), Accommodation & Food (6.39%) and Construction (5.80%).

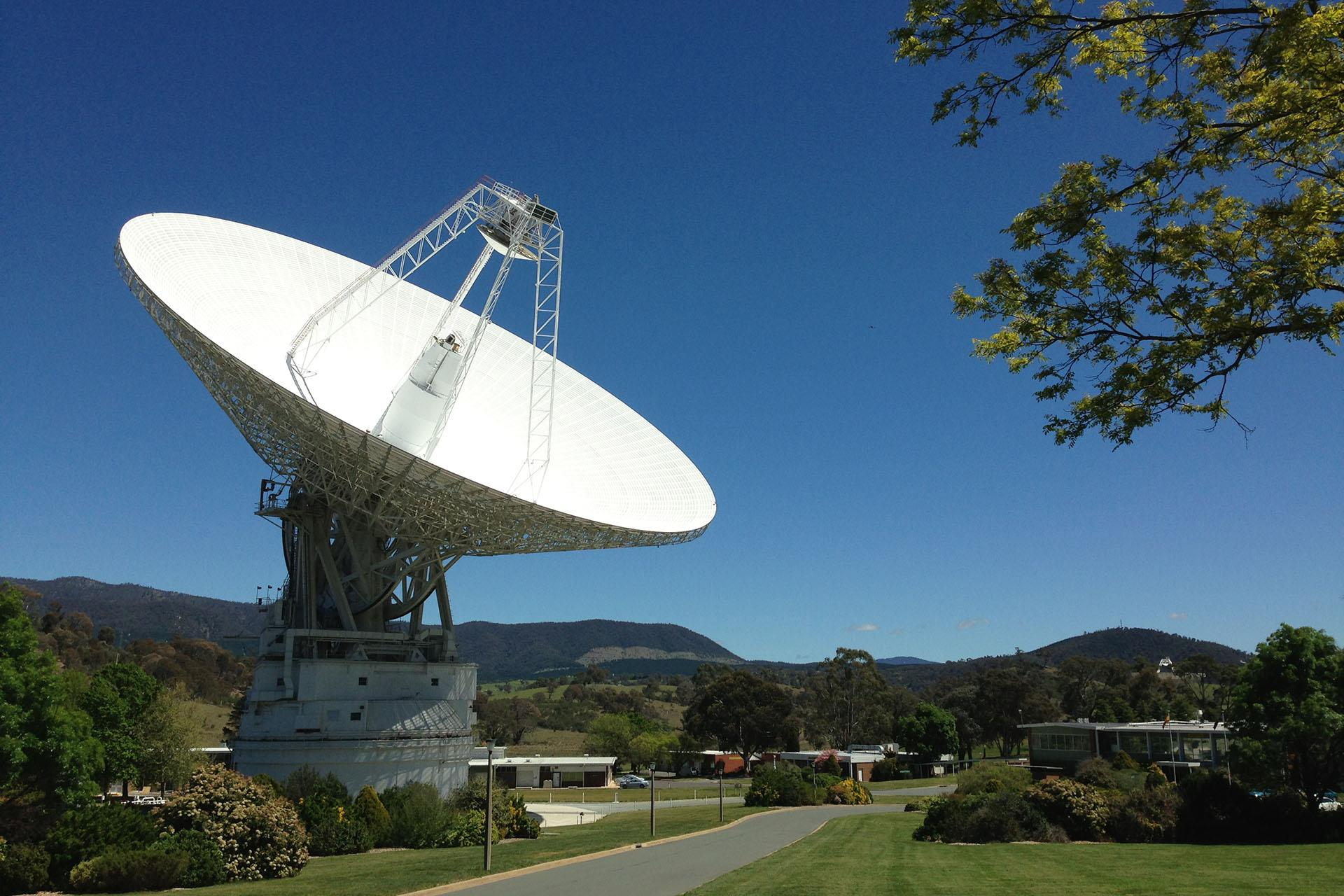
A growing number of Canberrans work in the science and technology sector, such as at the Canberra Deep Space Communication Complex.

The former RAAF Fairbairn, adjacent to the Canberra Airport was sold to the operators of the airport, but the base continues to be used for RAAF VIP flights. A growing number of software vendors have based themselves in Canberra, to capitalise on the concentration of government customers; these include Tower Software and RuleBurst. A consortium of private and government investors is making plans for a billion-dollar data hub, with the aim of making Canberra a leading centre of such activity in the Asia-Pacific region. A Canberra Cyber Security Innovation Node was established in 2019 to grow the ACT's cyber security sector and related space, defence and education industries.

== Demographics ==
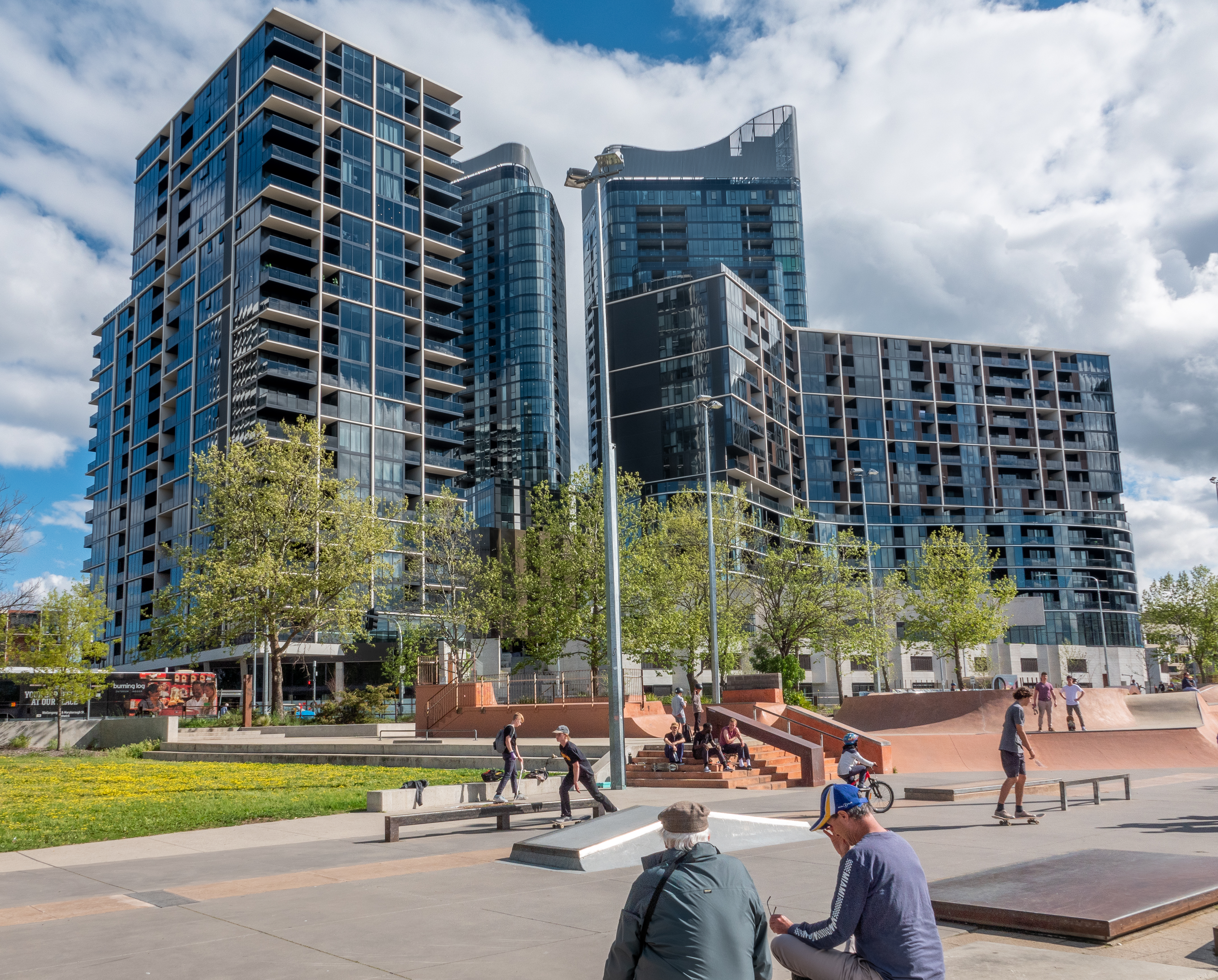
High-density residential apartments in Belconnen; Canberra has one of the fastest growing populations in the nation

As of June 2025, Canberra's estimated population, including the whole of the ACT, was 484,630. At the 2021 census, the population of the ACT was 453,558, while the population of the Canberra built-up area was 452,670, so 888 were located in the rural part of the ACT. This was up from 395,790 at the 2016 census, and 355,596 at the 2011 census. Canberra has been the fastest-growing city in Australia in recent years, having grown 23.3% from 2011 to 2021.

Canberrans are relatively young, highly mobile and well educated. In 2021, the median age was 35 years and only 13.8% of the population was aged over 65 years. Between 1996 and 2001, 61.9% of the population either moved to or from Canberra, which was the second highest mobility rate of any Australian capital city. A 2024 report from the Australian Bureau of Statistics indicates that 49% of ACT residents aged 15–74 held a bachelor's degree or higher, the highest proportion among all Australian states and territories. According to statistics collected by the National Australia Bank, Canberrans on average gave significantly more money to charity in 2014 than Australians in other states and territories, for both dollar giving and as a proportion of income.

Country of birth (2021)
Birthplace (Note: In accordance with the Australian Bureau of Statistics source, England, Scotland, Mainland China and the Special Administrative Regions of Hong Kong and Macau are listed separately)	Population
Australia	306,896
India	17,203
England	13,245
China (including SARs and Taiwan)	12,149
Nepal	5,689
New Zealand	5,122

At the 2021 census, the most commonly nominated ancestries were: (Note: As a percentage of 373,561 persons who nominated their ancestry at the 2016 census.)

- English (32.0%)
- Australian (31.5%) (Note: The Australian Bureau of Statistics has stated that most who nominate "Australian" as their ancestry are part of the Anglo-Celtic group.)
- Irish (11.6%)
- Scottish (10.0%)
- Chinese (5.7%)
- Indigenous (2.0%) (Note: Of any ancestry. Includes those identifying as Aboriginal Australians or Torres Strait Islanders. Indigenous identification is separate to the ancestry question on the Australian Census and persons identifying as Aboriginal or Torres Strait Islander may identify any ancestry.)

The 2021 census showed that 28.7% of Canberra's inhabitants were born overseas. Of inhabitants born outside Australia, the most prevalent countries of birth were India, England, China and Nepal. 2.0% of the population, or 8,949 people, identified as Indigenous Australians (Aboriginal Australians and Torres Strait Islanders) in 2021. This was an increase from 6,508 counted in 2016, and lower than the Australian percentage of 3.2% in 2021.

At the 2021 census, 71.3% of people spoke only English at home, down from 72.7% in 2016. The other languages most commonly spoken at home were Mandarin (3.2%), Nepali (1.3%), Vietnamese (1.1%), Punjabi (1.1%) and Hindi (1.0%).

In 2021, the main religious affiliation in the ACT was Catholicism (19.3%), Anglicanism (8.2%) and Hinduism (4.5%). 43.5% described themselves as having no religion and 5.2 did not state a religion.

== Culture ==
=== Education ===
ANU School of Art (formerly the Canberra High School)

The two main tertiary institutions are the Australian National University (ANU) in Acton, with over 10,200 undergraduate and over 7,100 postgraduate students, and the University of Canberra (UC) in Bruce, with over 11,800 undergraduate and 6,300 postgraduate students. Established in 1946, the ANU has always had a strong research focus and is ranked among the leading universities in the world and one of the best in Australia by the Times Higher Education World University Rankings and the QS World University Rankings. There are two religious university campuses in Canberra: Signadou in the northern suburb of Watson is a campus of the Australian Catholic University; St Mark's National Theological Centre in Barton is part of the secular Charles Sturt University. The ACT Government announced on 5 March 2020 that the CIT campus and an adjoining carpark in Reid would be leased to the University of New South Wales (UNSW) for a peppercorn lease, for it to develop as a campus for a new UNSW Canberra. UNSW released a master plan in 2021 for a 6,000 student campus to be realised over 15 years at a cost of $1 billion.

The Australian Defence College has two campuses: the Australian Command and Staff College (ACSC) plus the Centre for Defence and Strategic Studies (CDSS) at Weston, and the Australian Defence Force Academy (ADFA) beside the Royal Military College, Duntroon located in the inner-northern suburb of Campbell. ADFA teaches military undergraduates and postgraduates and includes UNSW Canberra at ADFA, a campus of the University of New South Wales. Duntroon provides Australian Army officer training.

Tertiary level vocational education is also available through the Canberra Institute of Technology (CIT), with campuses in Bruce, Woden, Gungahlin, Tuggeranong and Fyshwick. The combined enrolment of the CIT campuses was about 20,000 students in 2023. Following the transfer of land in Reid for the new UNSW Canberra, a new CIT campus in Woden was completed in July 2025. In 2016 there were 140 schools in Canberra; 93 were operated by the government and 47 were private. Canberra also has the highest percentage of non-government (private) school students in Australia, accounting for 40.6 per cent of ACT enrolments.

=== Arts, entertainment and events ===
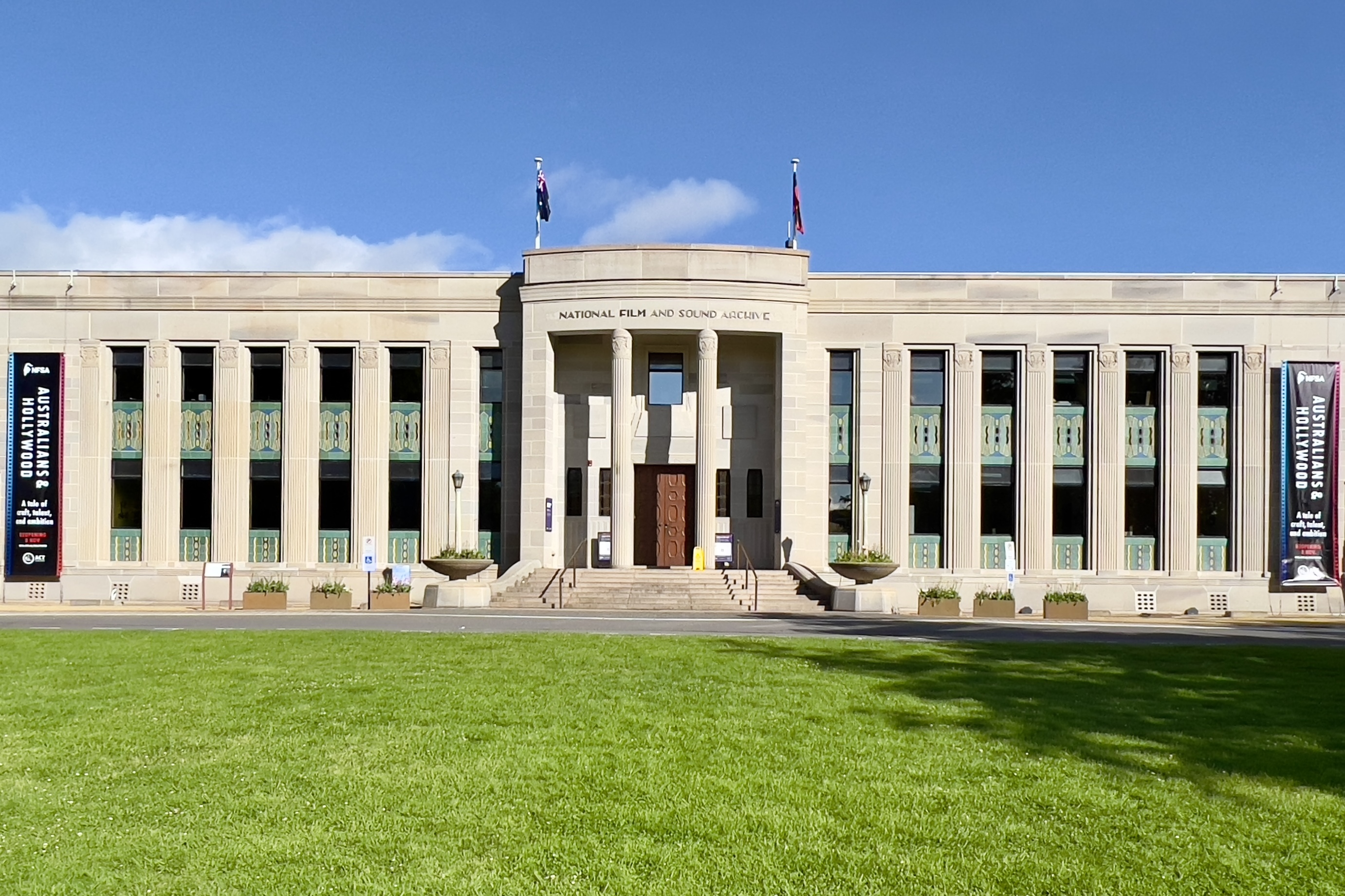
National Film and Sound Archive

Canberra is home to many national monuments and institutions such as Parliament House, the High Court the National Gallery of Australia, the National Portrait Gallery, the National Library, the National Archives, Questacon and the Museum of Australian Democracy at Old Parliament House, all lying in the Parliamentary Triangle. Many Commonwealth government buildings in Canberra are open to the public, including Parliament House, the High Court and the Royal Australian Mint. Nearby, in Campbell, Acton and Civic are the Australian War Memorial, the Australian Academy of Science, the National Film and Sound Archive, the National Museum and the Australian Institute of Aboriginal and Torres Strait Islander Studies.

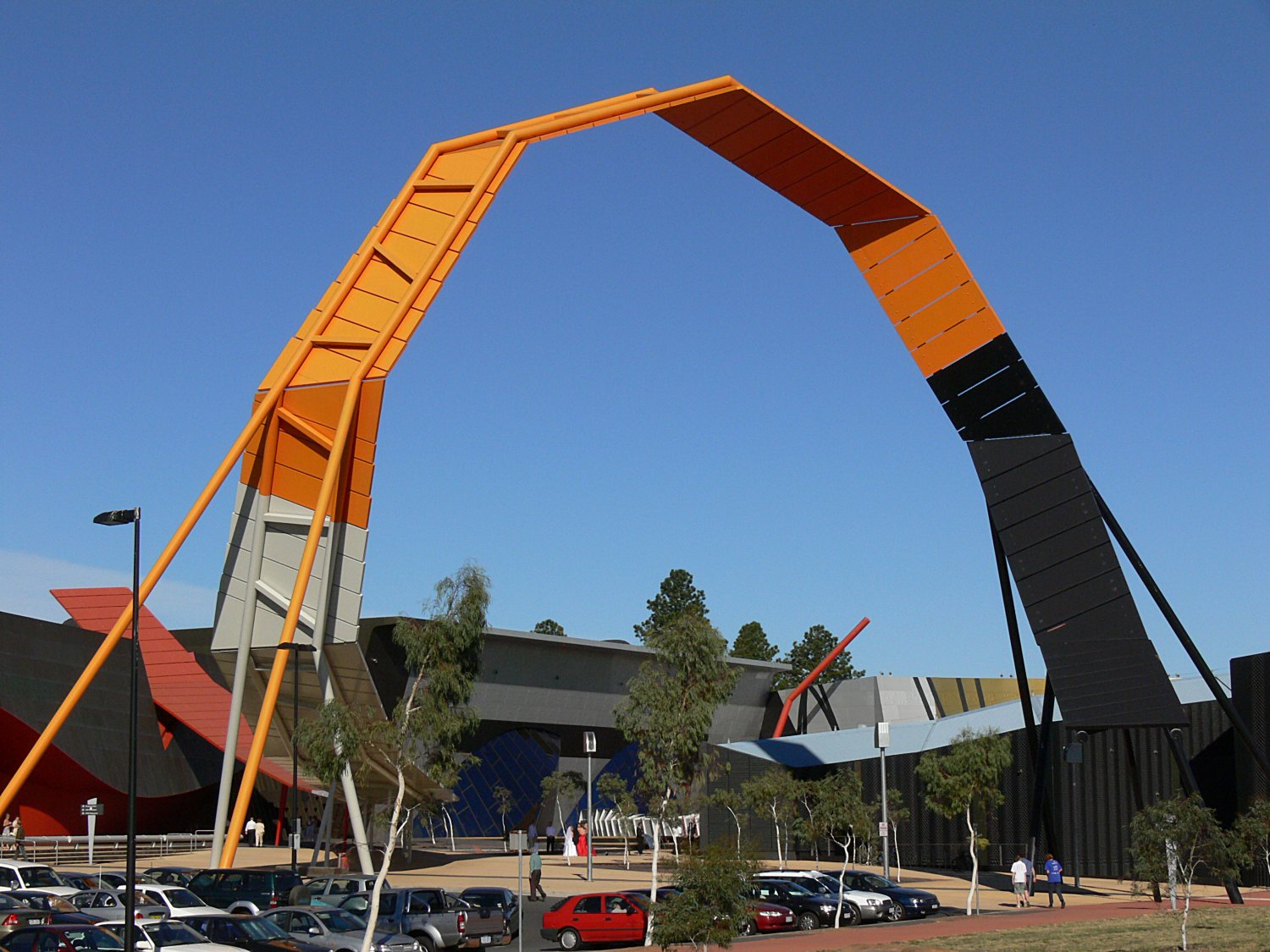
The National Museum of Australia established in 2001 records Australia's social history and is one of Canberra's more architecturally daring buildings.

Lake Burley Griffin is the site of the Captain James Cook Memorial and the National Carillon. Other sites in the Parliamentary Triangle are Commonwealth Place, Reconciliation Place and Commonwealth Park, which is the site of Canberra's annual Floriade. This is the largest flower festival in the Southern Hemisphere and features a large display of flowers every Spring. The Canberra Balloon Spectacular is held in March on the Patrick White Lawns, next to the National Library. Located to the north of the lake are the Australian National Botanic Gardens, the Australian–American Memorial, Anzac Parade, which is lined by several memorials, the National Arboretum and the National Zoo and Aquarium.

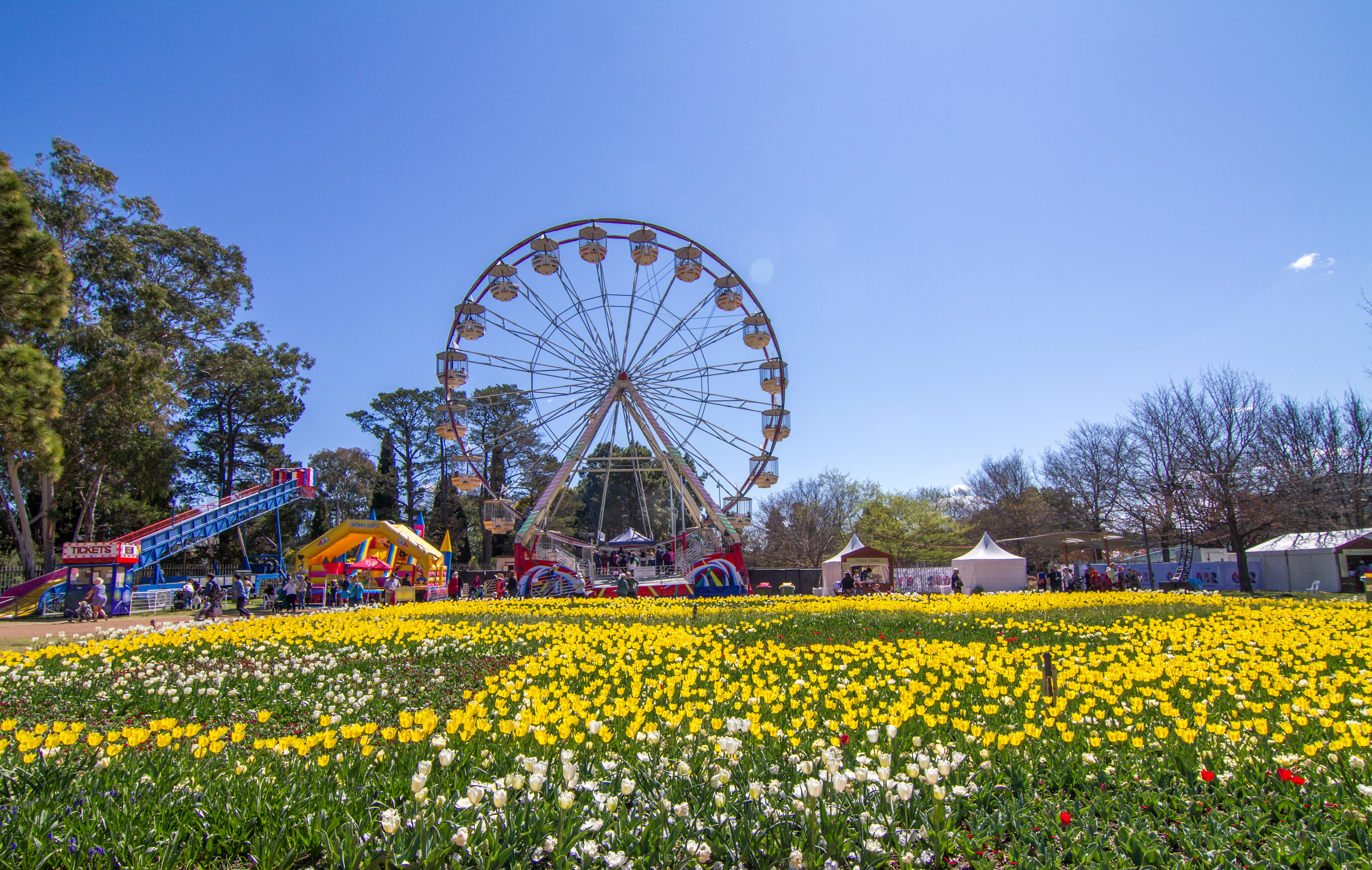
Floriade is held in Commonwealth Park every spring. It is the largest flower festival in the Southern Hemisphere.

The Canberra Museum and Gallery in the city is a repository of local history and art, housing a permanent collection and visiting exhibitions. Several historic homes are open to the public: Lanyon and Tuggeranong Homesteads in the Tuggeranong Valley, Mugga-Mugga in Symonston, and Blundells' Cottage in Parkes all display the lifestyle of the early European settlers. Calthorpes' House in Red Hill is a well-preserved example of a 1920s house from Canberra's very early days. Strathnairn Homestead is an historic building which also dates from the 1920s. The Schoolhouse Museum at St John's Anglican Church in Reid showcases school life in the 1840s.

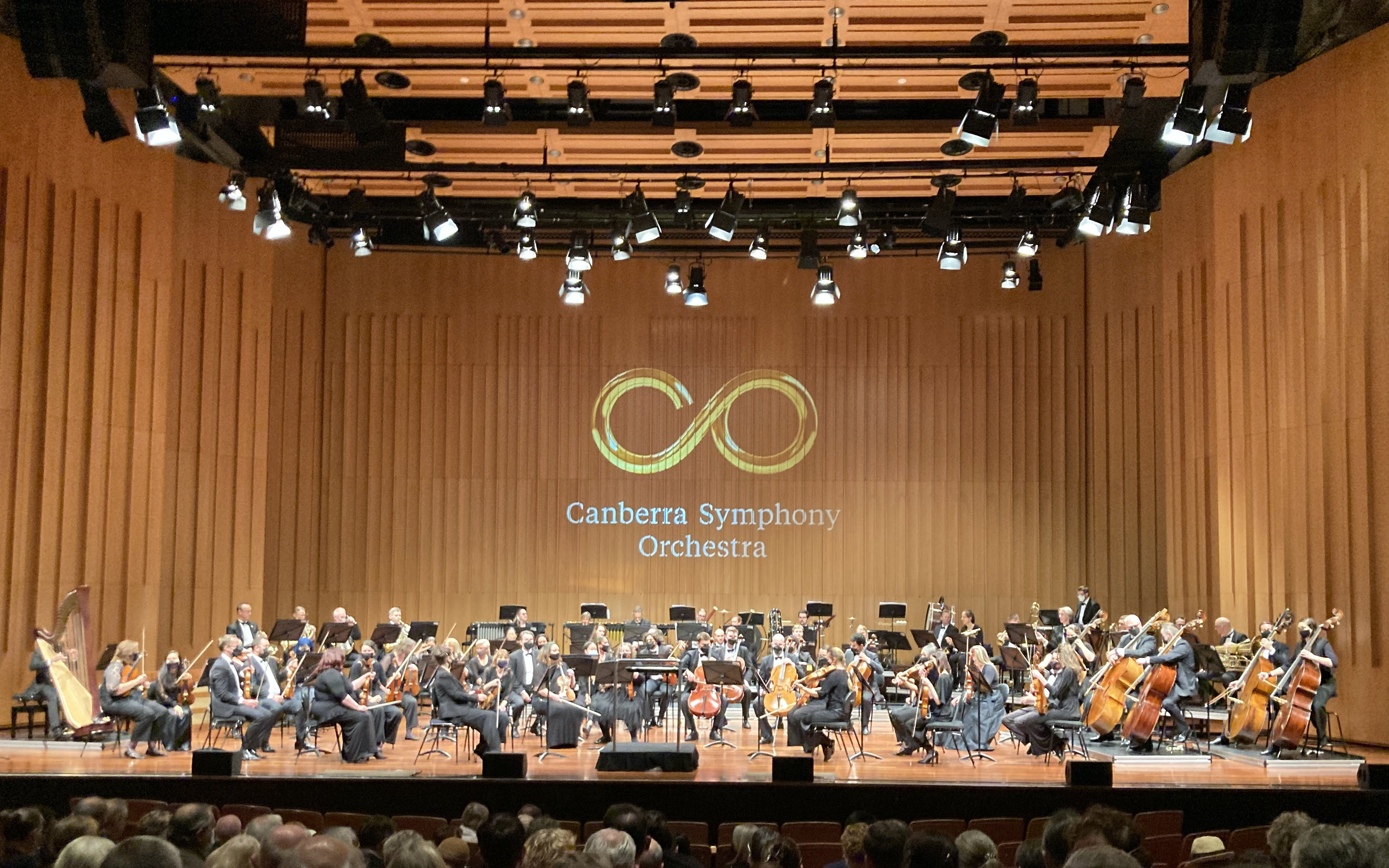
Llewellyn Hall is home to the Canberra Symphony Orchestra

Canberra has many venues for live music and theatre: the Canberra Theatre and Playhouse which hosts many major concerts and productions; and Llewellyn Hall (within the ANU School of Music), a world-class concert hall are two of the most notable. The Street Theatre is a venue with less mainstream offerings. The Albert Hall was the city's first performing arts venue, opened in 1928. It was the original performance venue for theatre groups such as the Canberra Repertory Society.

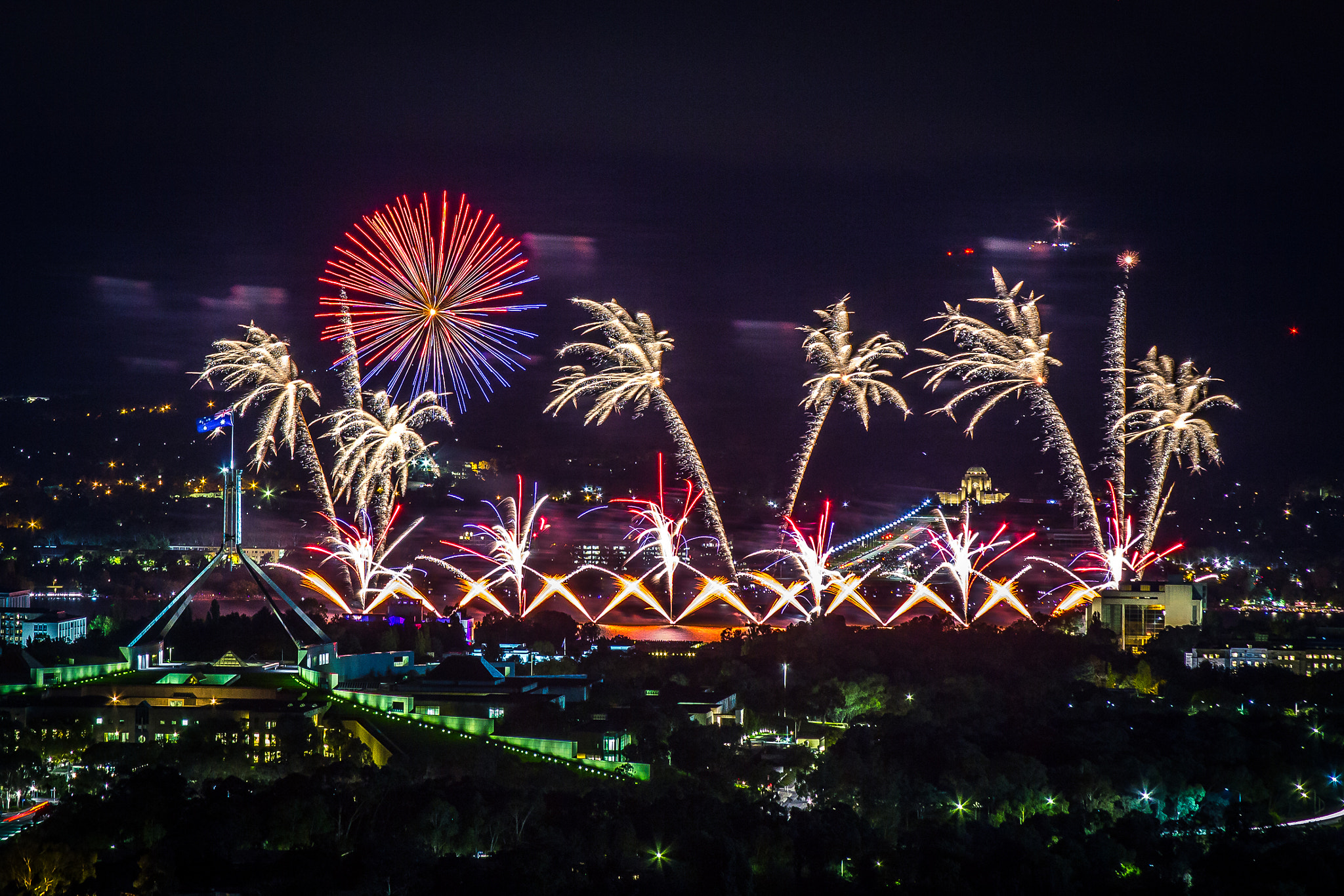
The annual Skyfire fireworks display over Lake Burley Griffin, held during the Enlighten Festival

There are numerous bars and nightclubs which also offer live entertainment, particularly concentrated in the areas of the city and Braddon. All town centres have a library. Popular cultural events include the National Folk Festival, the Royal Canberra Show, the Summernats car festival, Enlighten festival and the National Multicultural Festival in February. The National Dinosaur Museum is located on the Barton Highway north of Canberra.

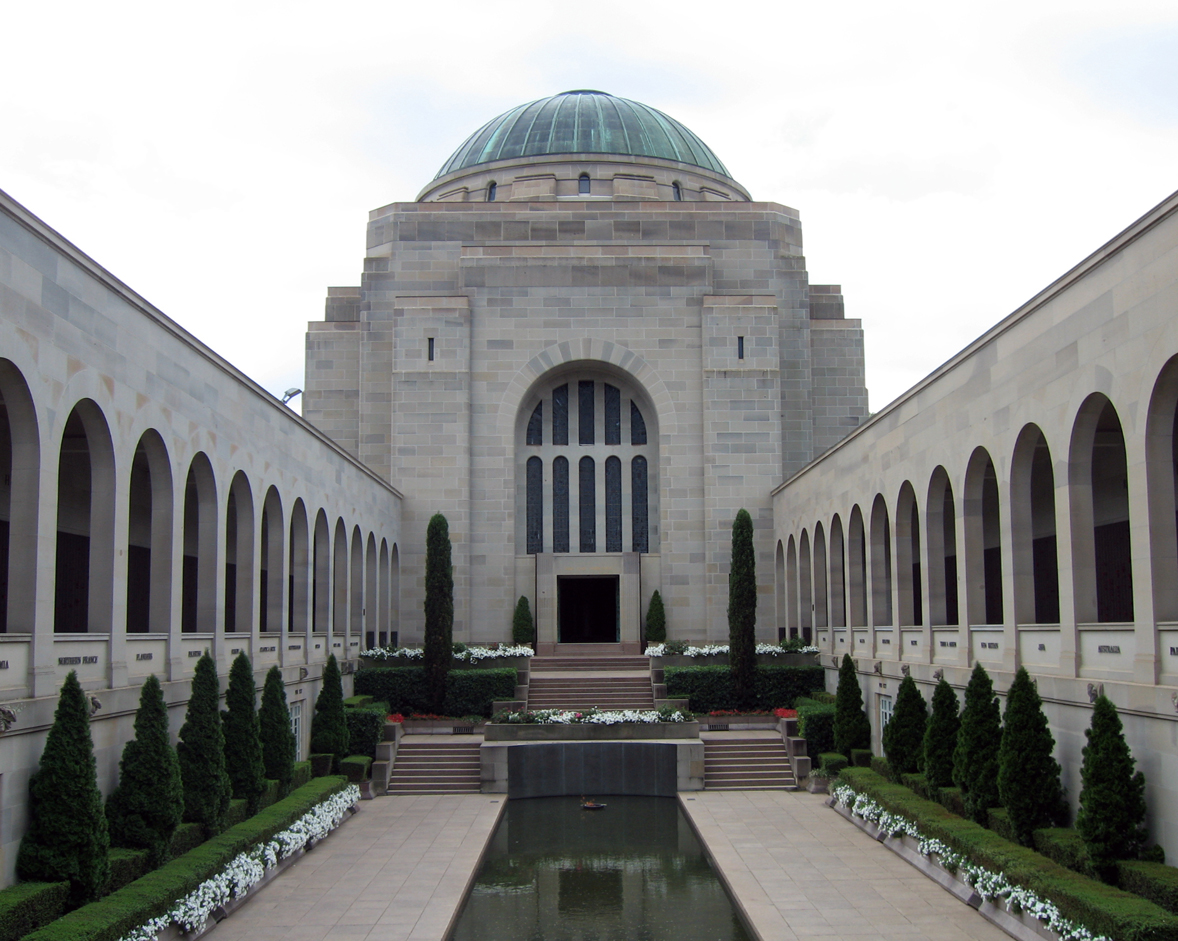
The Australian War Memorial

=== Media ===
As Australia's capital, Canberra is the most important centre for much of Australia's political reportage and thus all the major media, including the Australian Broadcasting Corporation, the commercial television networks, and the metropolitan newspapers maintain local bureaus. News organisations are represented in the press gallery, a group of journalists who report on the national parliament. The National Press Club of Australia in Barton has regular television broadcasts of its lunches at which a prominent guest, typically a politician or other public figure, delivers a speech followed by a question-and-answer session. Canberra has a daily newspaper, The Canberra Times, which was established in 1926.

There are a number of AM and FM stations broadcasting in Canberra (AM/FM Listing). Commercial operators include the Capital Radio Network (2CA and 2CC), and Austereo/ARN (104.7 and Mix 106.3). There are also several community operated stations. Each of Australia's three commercial television networks and two public broadcasters broadcast in Canberra, each over a primary channel and several multichannels.

- ABC Canberra (ABC)
- SBS New South Wales (SBS)
- Network 10 Southern NSW & ACT (CTC) – Network 10 owned and operated station
- Seven Network Southern NSW & ACT (CBN) – Seven Network owned and operated station
- WIN Television Southern NSW & ACT (WIN) – Nine Network affiliate

=== Sport ===
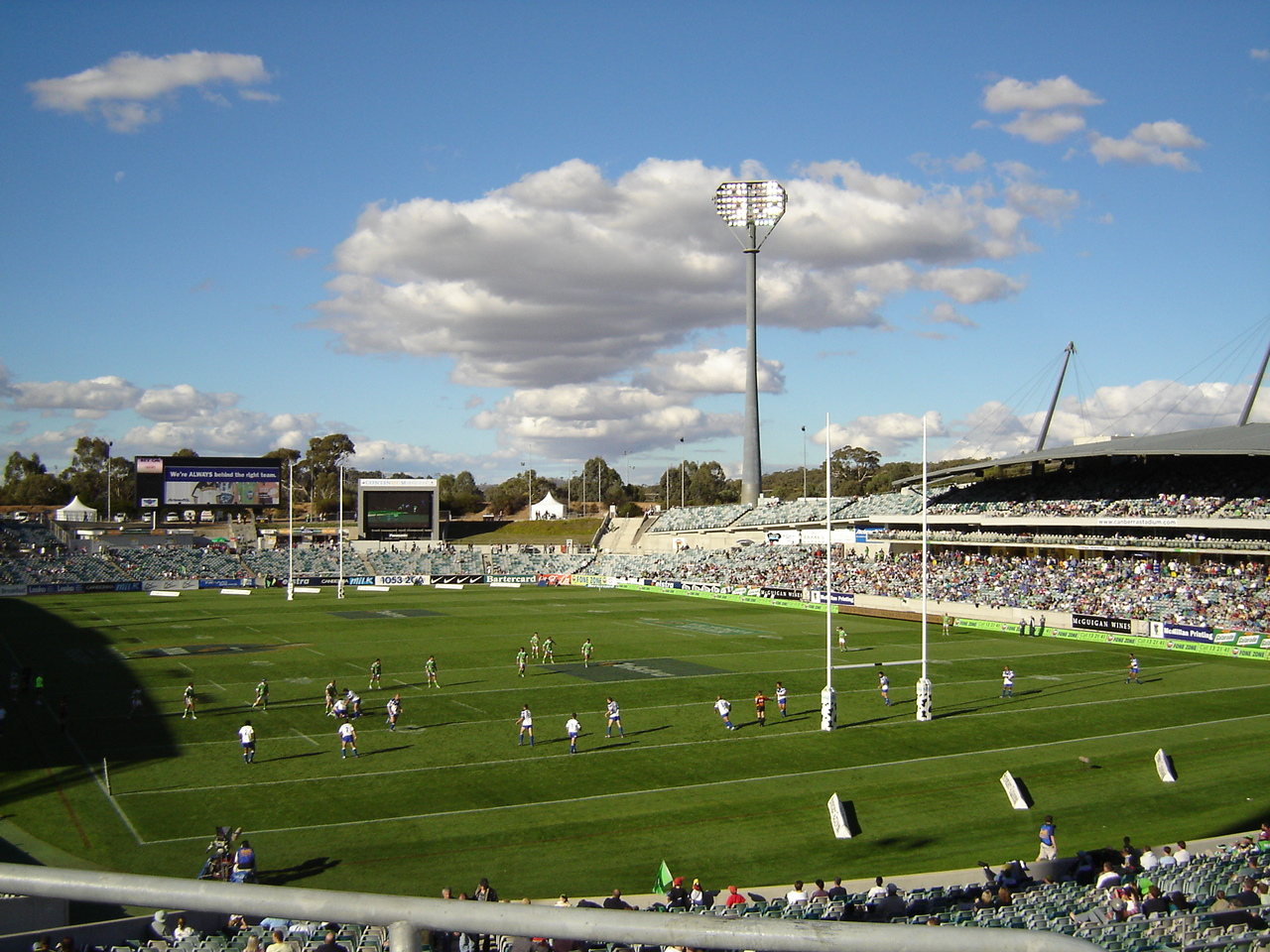
A rugby league match at Canberra Stadium

In addition to local sporting leagues, Canberra has a number of sporting teams that compete in national and international competitions. The best known teams are the Canberra Raiders and the ACT Brumbies who play rugby league and rugby union respectively; both have been champions of their leagues. Both teams play their home games at Canberra Stadium, which was used to hold group matches in football for the 2000 Summer Olympics and in rugby union for the 2003 Rugby World Cup. Canberra United represents the city in the A-League Women (formerly the W-League), the national women's soccer league and were champions in 2014. The ACT division of the Australian Football League bid for a club for the national competition in 1981. The league has rejected numerous such proposals over the years and, since 2013, it has designated Canberra as being represented by the Greater Western Sydney Giants, which has played three home games at Manuka Oval each season since 2013 with support from the ACT Government. The city also has a successful basketball team, the Canberra Capitals, which has won nine national women's basketball titles, most recently in 2019–20. The historic Prime Minister's XI cricket match is played at Manuka Oval annually. Other significant annual sporting events include the annual Canberra Marathon, established in 1976, and the Challenge Canberra middle distance triathlon race was established in 2023. The Canberra Tennis International has been held at the Canberra Tennis Centre, Lyneham since 2015, usually annually.

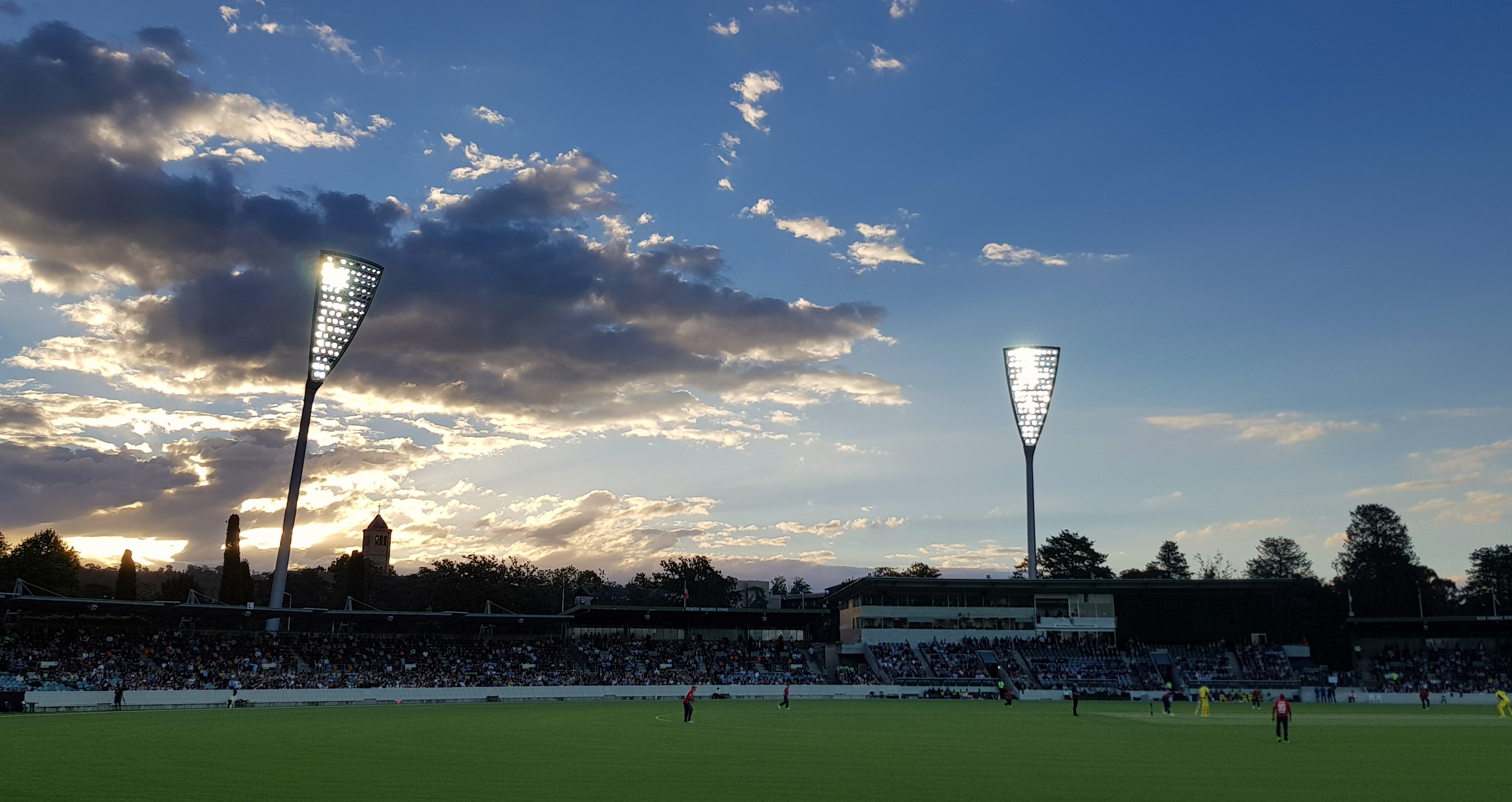
The annual Prime Minister's XI cricket match at Manuka Oval

The Australian Institute of Sport (AIS) is located in the Canberra suburb of Bruce. The AIS is a specialised educational and training institution providing coaching for elite junior and senior athletes in a number of sports. The AIS has been operating since 1981 and has achieved significant success in producing elite athletes, both local and international. The majority of Australia's team members and medallists at the 2000 Summer Olympics in Sydney were AIS graduates.

A Canberra-wide series of bicycle paths are available to cyclists for recreational and sporting purposes. Canberra Nature Parks have a large range of walking paths, horse and mountain bike trails. Water sports like sailing, rowing and dragon boating are held on Canberra's lakes. A popular form of exercise for people working near or in the Parliamentary Triangle is to do the "bridge to bridge walk/run" of about 5 km around Lake Burley Griffin, crossing the Commonwealth Avenue Bridge and Kings Avenue Bridge, using the paths beside the lake. The walk takes about 1 hour, making it ideal for a lunchtime excursion. This is also popular on weekends. Such was the popularity during the COVID-19 isolation in 2020 that the ACT Government initiated a 'Clockwise is COVID-wise' rule for walkers and runners.

Active sports teams in Canberra
Club	League	Sport	Venue	Established
ACT Meteors	WNCL	Cricket	Manuka Oval	2009
ACT Brumbies Men's	Super Rugby	Rugby Union	GIO Stadium	1995
ACT Brumbies Women	Super Rugby Women's	Rugby Union	GIO Stadium/Viking Park	2018
Canberra Raiders	NRL	Rugby League	GIO Stadium	1981
Canberra Raiders Women's	NRLW	Rugby League	GIO Stadium	2022
Canberra United FC	A-League Women	Soccer	McKellar Park	2008
Canberra Brave	AIHL	Ice hockey	Phillip Ice Skating Centre	2014
Canberra Chill	Hockey One	Field hockey	National Hockey Centre	2019
University of Canberra Capitals	WNBL	Basketball	AIS Arena	1986

== Infrastructure ==
=== Health ===
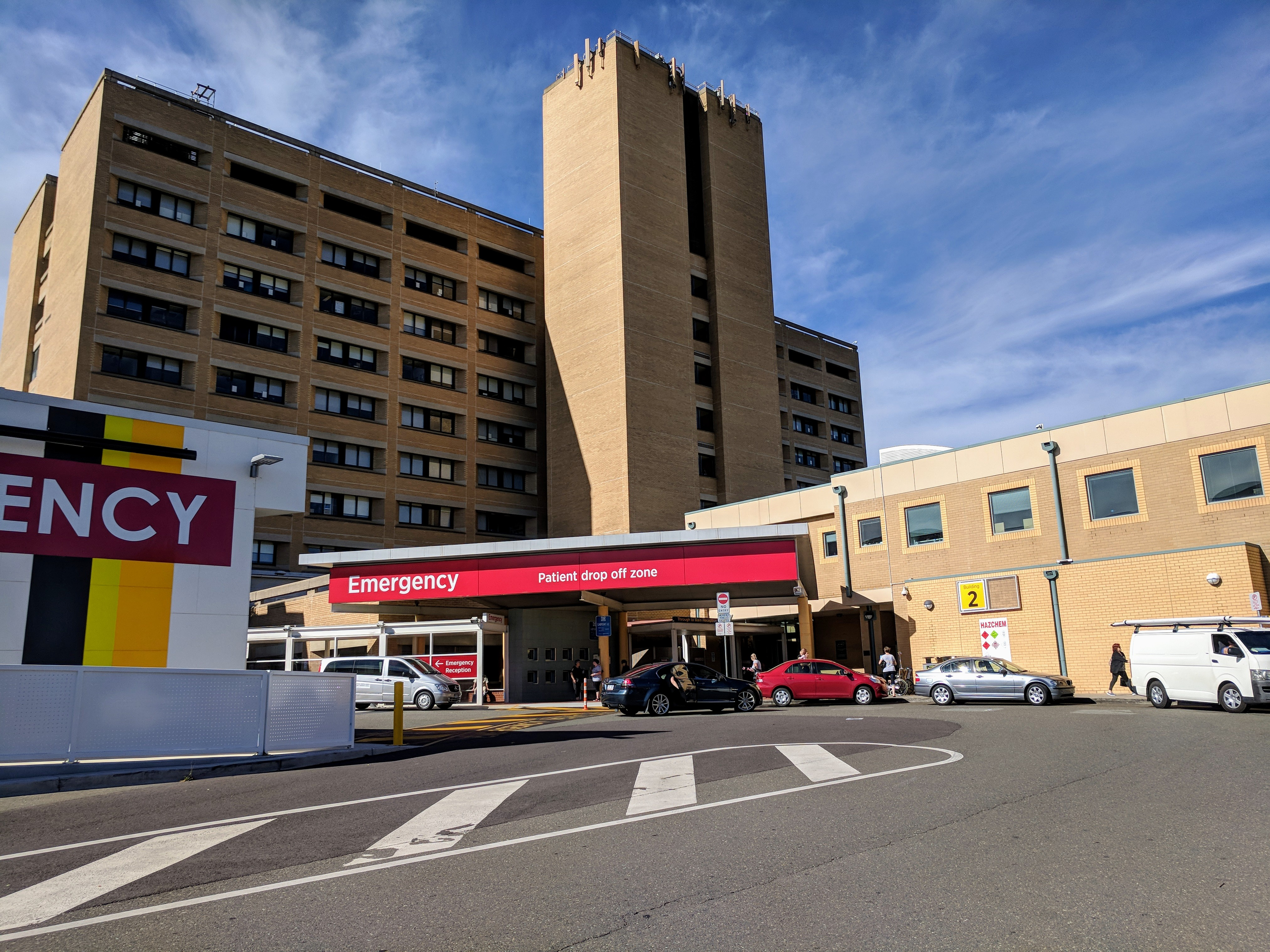
The Canberra Hospital

Canberra has two large public hospitals, the approximately 600-bed Canberra Hospital—formerly the Woden Valley Hospital—in Garran and the 250-bed North Canberra Hospital in Bruce. The latter was called Calvary Public Hospital Bruce before its acquisition by the ACT Government in 2023. Both are teaching institutions. The largest private hospital is the Calvary John James Hospital in Deakin, which is being redeveloped to include 98 beds by 2028, Calvary Bruce Private Hospital in Bruce and Healthscope's National Capital Private Hospital in Garran are also major healthcare providers.

The Royal Canberra Hospital was located on Acton Peninsula on Lake Burley Griffin; it was closed in 1991 and was demolished in 1997 in a controversial and fatal implosion to facilitate construction of the National Museum of Australia. Ambulance services are provided by the ACT Ambulance Service, one of four operational agencies of the ACT Emergency Services Agency.

=== Transport ===
==== Roads ====
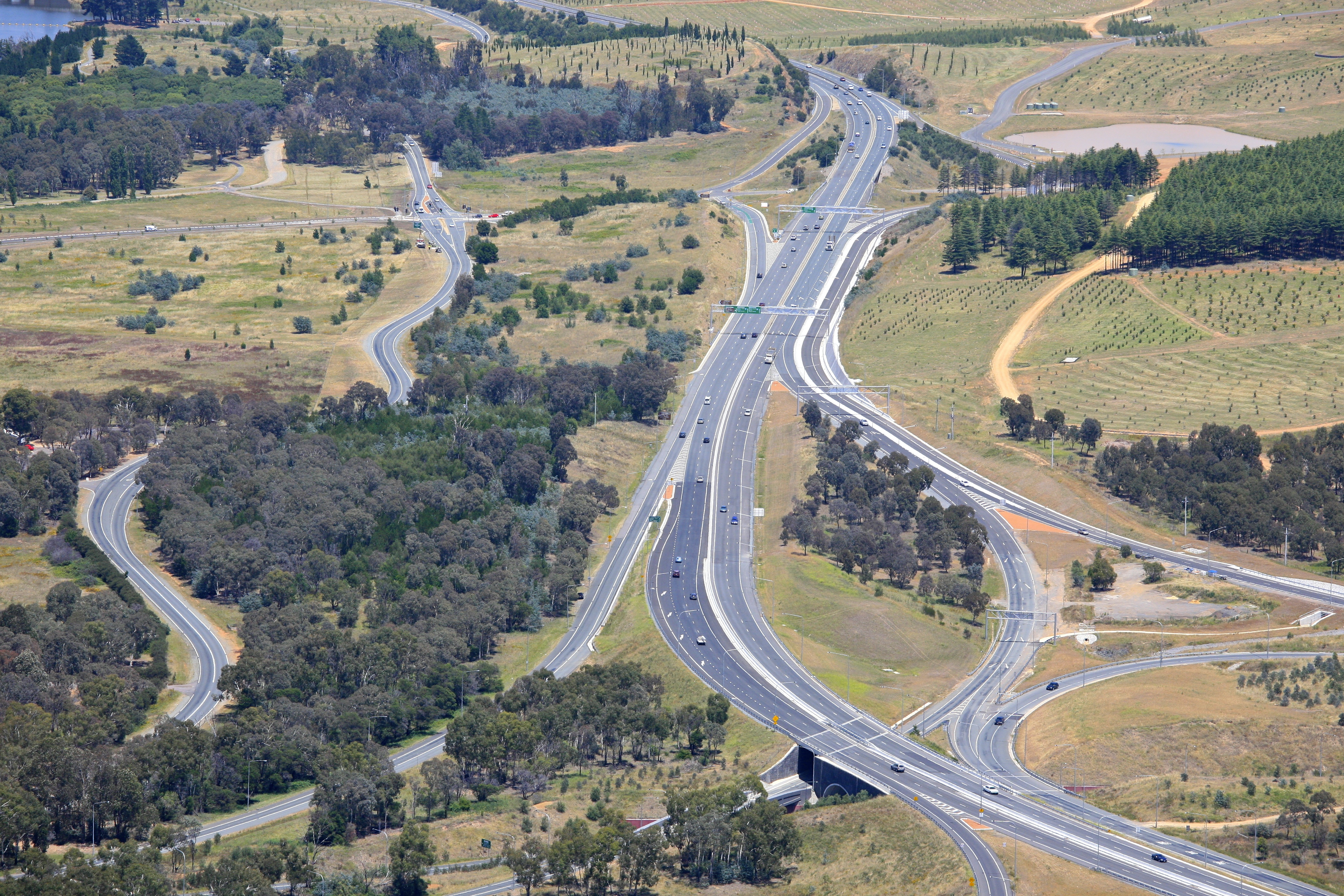
The Glenloch Interchange connects the Tuggeranong Parkway with Parkes Way

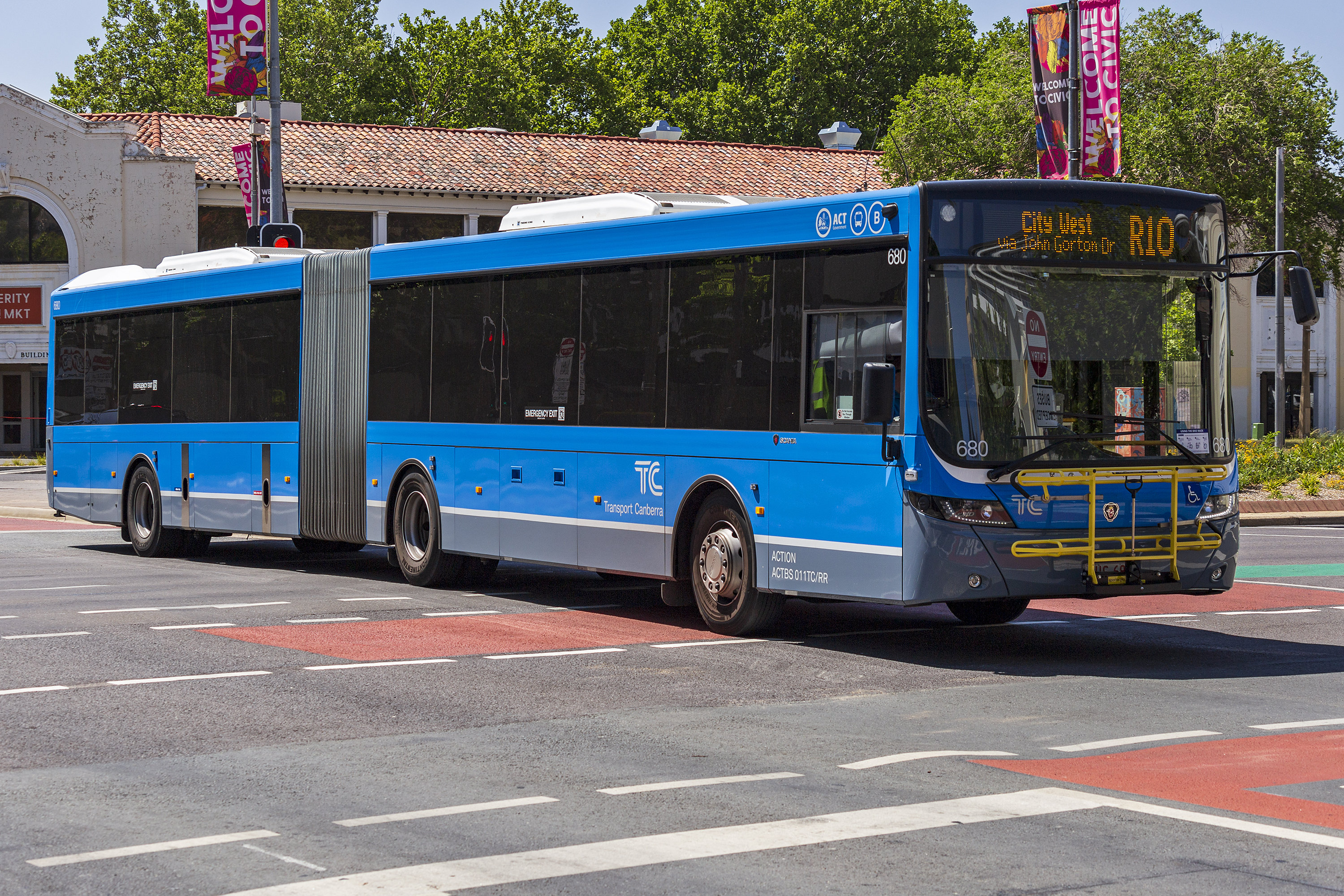
ACTION Volgren bodied Scania K360UA

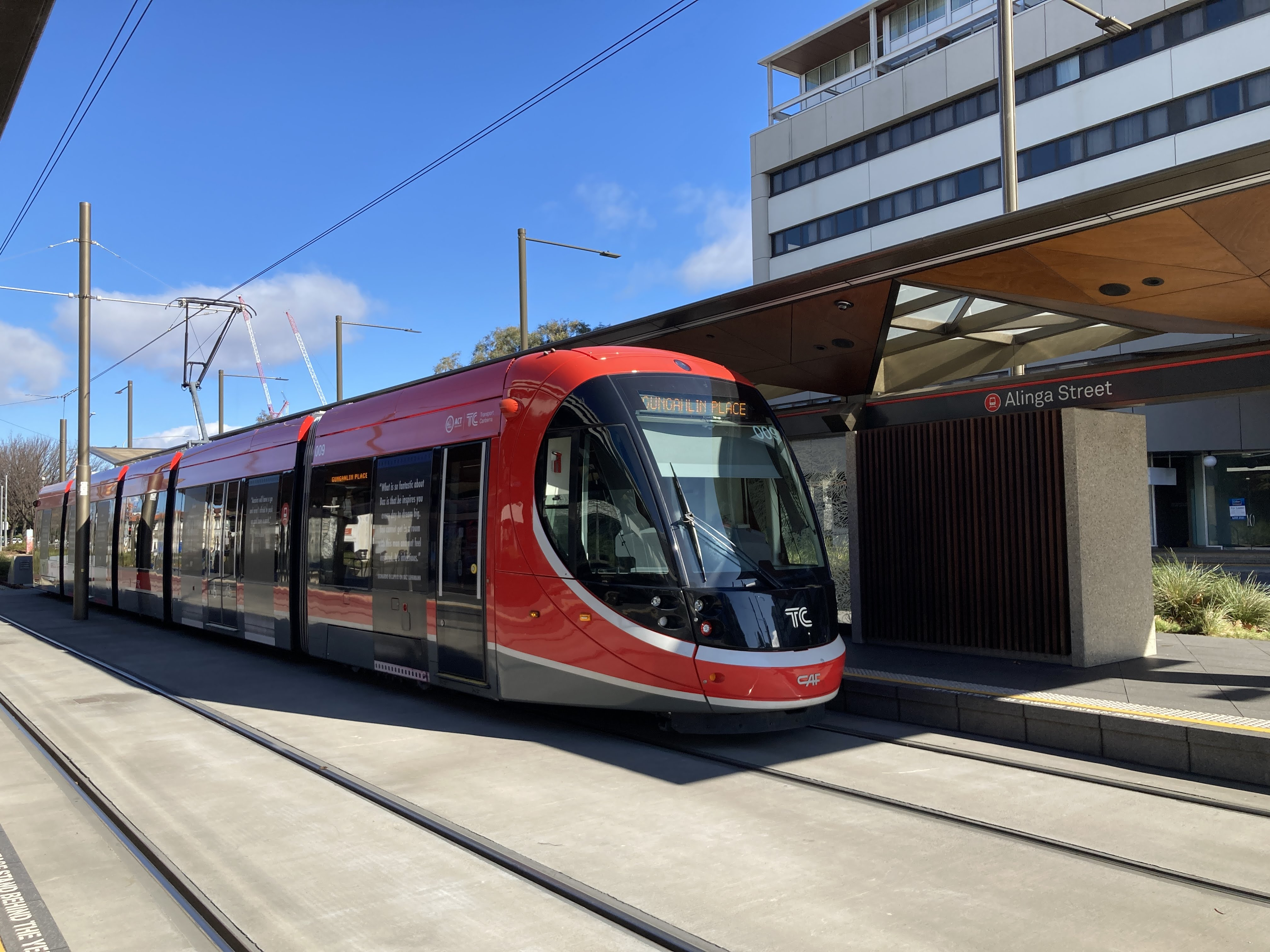
Alinga Street light rail station

The automobile is by far the dominant form of transport in Canberra, comprising 76.5% of trips in 2017. The speed limit in most suburban roads is 50 km/h (31 mph), but some major suburban roads have a speed limit of 60 km/h (37 mph). School zones, for some hours on school days, and town centres have limits of 40 km/h (25 mph). Limited access dual carriageway roads, generally known as parkways, have higher speed limits, including the Tuggeranong Parkway, which links Canberra's CBD and Tuggeranong and has a speed limit of 100 km/h (62 mph) for most of its length.

In 1974 the National Capital Development Commission announced a shift in transport planning to prioritise public transport and discourage commuting by car. The Commission's Transport Policy was a progressive, possibly radical, approach to transport planning for the time. Unwilling to accept the advice of a 1977 traffic study, the NCDC abandoned its commitment to expert-led planning, suppressed the modelling report and revived its car-oriented transport plans from the 1960s. This led to Canberra being a car-dominated city today. In 2006 Canberrans were the most likely of any Australian city dwellers to use their cars to get to work.

In an effort to improve road safety, traffic cameras were first introduced to Canberra by the Kate Carnell Government in 1999. The traffic cameras installed in Canberra include fixed red-light and speed cameras and point-to-point speed cameras; together they brought in revenue of approximately $11 million per year in fines in about 2014. There are two local taxi companies. Aerial Capital Group enjoyed monopoly status until the arrival of Cabxpress in 2007. In October 2015 the ACT Government passed legislation to regulate ride sharing, allowing ride share services including Uber to operate legally in Canberra. The ACT Government was the first jurisdiction in Australia to enact legislation to regulate the service. Since then many other ride sharing and taxi services have started in ACT namely Ola, Glide Taxi and GoCatch

Canberra is about three hours by road from Sydney on the Federal Highway (National Highway 23), which connects with the Hume Highway (National Highway 31) near Goulburn, and seven hours by road from Melbourne on the Barton Highway (National Highway 25), which joins the Hume Highway at Yass. It is a two-hour drive on the Monaro Highway (National Highway 23) to the ski fields of the Snowy Mountains and the Kosciuszko National Park. Batemans Bay, a popular holiday spot on the New South Wales coast, is also two hours away via the Kings Highway. Interstate coach services operate on these roads, with three companies operating a Sydney-Canberra express route: Murrays, FlixBus, and Greyhound Australia. Other coach routes include: Murrays buses to Wollongong (via Moss Vale) and Narooma (via Batemans Bay); FlixBus buses to Melbourne (via Albury); V/Line buses to Wodonga (via Gundagai) and Bairnsdale and Traralgon (via Cooma); NSW TrainLink buses to Bombala and Eden (via Cooma), Wagga Wagga, Cootamundra and Goulburn; and CDC Canberra buses to Queanbeyan, Yass and Bungendore.

==== Public transport ====
Transport Canberra provides bus and light rail services throughout the city. CDC Canberra provides bus services between Canberra and nearby areas of New South Wales, including Queanbeyan, Bungendore, Murrumbateman and Yass. A light rail line commenced service on 20 April 2019 linking the CBD with the northern district of Gungahlin. A planned Stage 2A of Canberra's light rail network will run from Alinga Street station to Commonwealth Park, adding three new stops at City West, City South and Commonwealth Park. Work on stage 2 commenced in November 2022 and the line is expected to be open in early 2028. At the 2021 census, 6.3% of the journeys to work involved public transport, while 4.0% walked to work.

==== Interstate rail ====
An interstate NSW TrainLink railway service connects Canberra to Sydney. Canberra railway station is in the inner south suburb of Kingston. Between 1920 and 1922 the train line crossed the Molonglo River and ran as far north as the city centre, although the line was closed following major flooding and was never rebuilt, while plans for a line to Yass were abandoned. A 3 ft 6 in (1,067 mm) gauge construction railway was built in 1923 between the Yarralumla brickworks and the provisional Parliament House; it was later extended to Civic, but the whole line was closed in May 1927. Train services to Melbourne are provided by way of a NSW TrainLink bus service which connects with a rail service between Sydney and Melbourne in Yass, about a one-hour drive from Canberra.

Plans to establish a high-speed rail service between Melbourne, Canberra and Sydney, have not been implemented, as the various proposals have been deemed economically unviable. The original plans for Canberra included proposals for railed transport within the city, however none eventuated. The phase 2 report of the most recent proposal, the High Speed Rail Study, was published by the Department of Infrastructure and Transport on 11 April 2013. A railway connecting Canberra to Jervis Bay was also planned but never constructed.

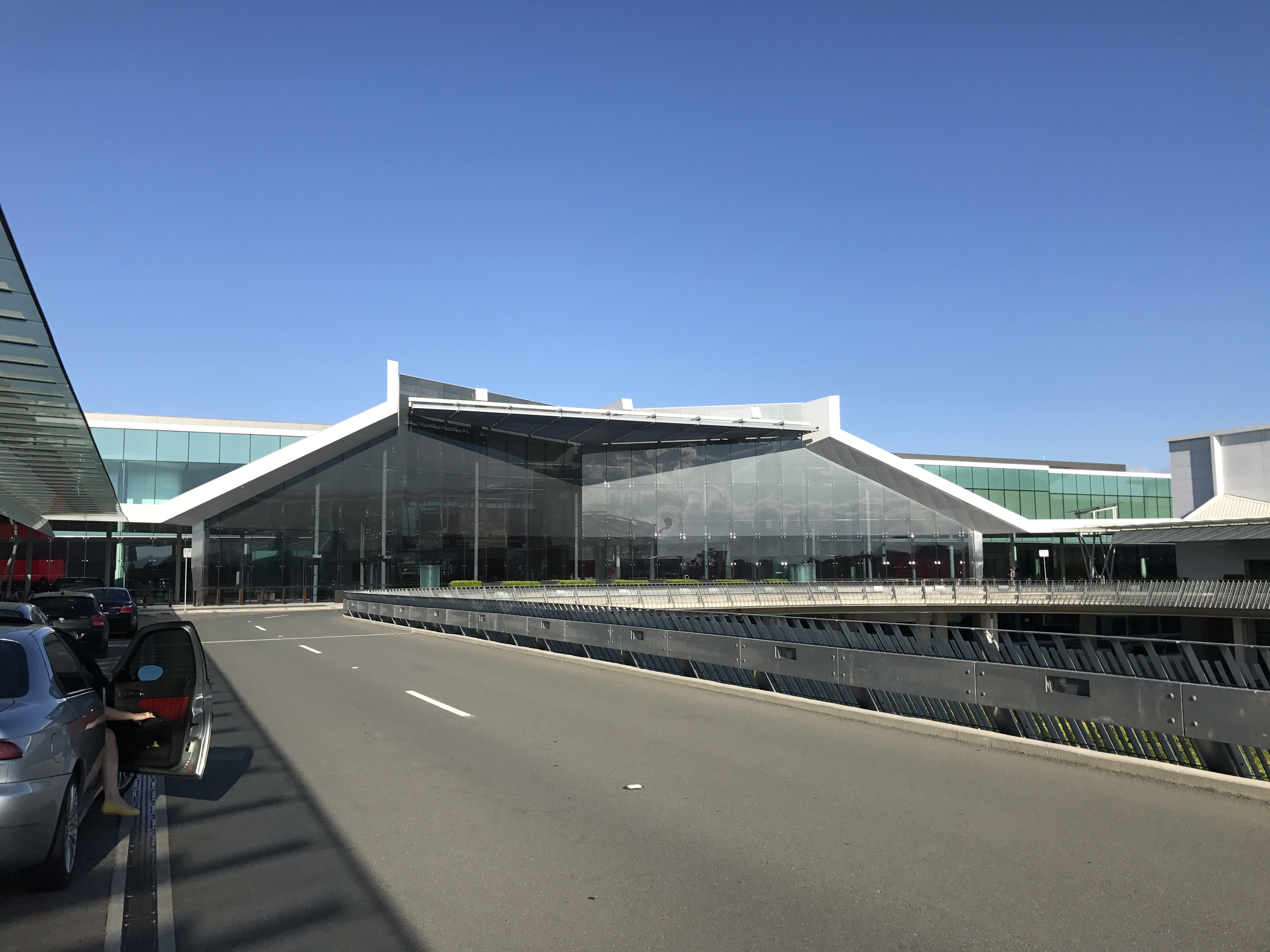
Canberra Airport terminal

==== Air travel ====
Canberra Airport provides direct domestic services to Adelaide, Brisbane, Cairns, Darwin, Gold Coast, Hobart, Melbourne, Perth, Sunshine Coast and Sydney with connections to other domestic centres. There are also direct flights to small regional towns: Ballina, Dubbo, Newcastle and Port Macquarie in New South Wales. Canberra Airport is, as of September 2013, designated by the Australian Government Department of Infrastructure and Regional Development as a restricted use designated international airport. International flights have previously been operated by both Singapore Airlines and Qatar Airways. Fiji Airways has announced direct flights to Nadi commencing in July 2023. Until 2003 the civilian airport shared runways with RAAF Base Fairbairn. In June of that year, the Air Force base was decommissioned and from that time the airport was fully under civilian control.

==== Active transport ====
Canberra has one of the highest rates of active travel of all Australian major cities, with 7.1 per cent of commuters walking or cycling to work in 2011. An ACT Government survey conducted in late 2010 found that Canberrans walk an average of 26 minutes each day. According to The Canberra Times in March 2014, Canberra's cyclists are involved in an average of four reported collisions every week. The newspaper also reported that Canberra is home to 87,000 cyclists, translating to the highest cycling participation rate in Australia; and, with higher popularity, bike injury rates in 2012 were twice the national average.

Since late 2020, two scooter-sharing systems have been operational in Canberra: orange scooters from Neuron Mobility and purple scooters from Beam Mobility, both Singapore-based companies that operate in many Australian cities. These services cover much of Canberra Central and Central Belconnen, with plans to expand coverage to more areas of the city in 2022.

=== Utilities ===
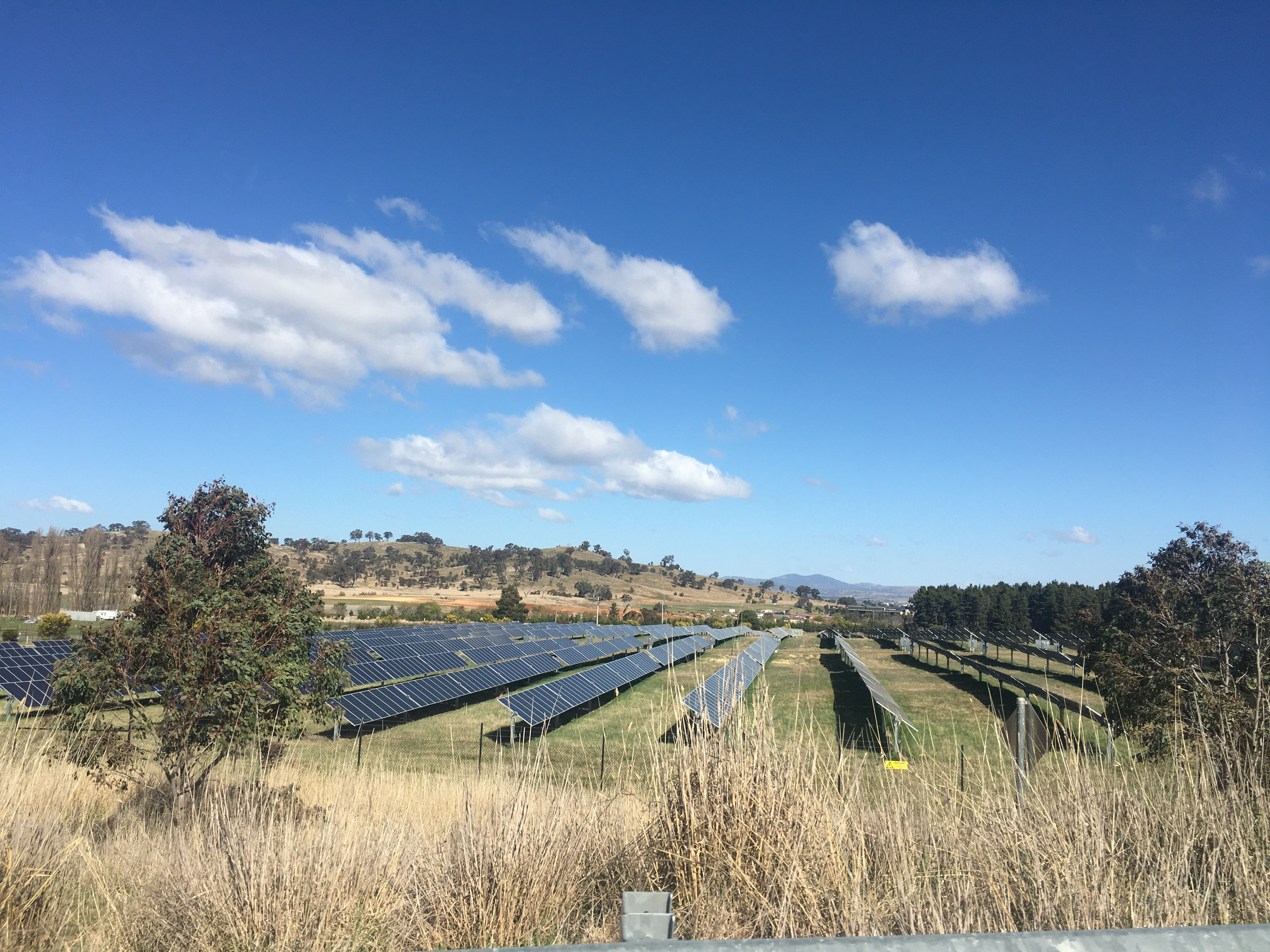
The Mount Majura Solar Farm has a rated output of 2.3 megawatts and was opened on 6 October 2016.

The government-owned Icon Water manages Canberra's water and sewerage infrastructure. ActewAGL is a joint venture between ACTEW and AGL, and is the retail provider of Canberra's utility services including water, natural gas, electricity, and also some telecommunications services via a subsidiary TransACT.

Canberra's water is stored in four reservoirs, the Corin, Bendora and Cotter dams on the Cotter River and the Googong Dam on the Queanbeyan River. Although the Googong Dam is located in New South Wales, it is managed by the ACT government. Icon Water owns Canberra's two wastewater treatment plants, located at Fyshwick and on the lower reaches of the Molonglo River.

Electricity for Canberra mainly comes from the national power grid through substations at Holt and Fyshwick (via Queanbeyan). Power was first supplied from the Kingston Powerhouse near the Molonglo River, a thermal plant built in 1913, but this was finally closed in 1957. The ACT has four solar farms, which were opened between 2014 and 2017: Royalla (rated output of 20 megawatts, 2014), Mount Majura (2.3 MW, 2016), Mugga Lane (13 MW, 2017) and Williamsdale (11 MW, 2017). In addition, numerous houses in Canberra have photovoltaic panels or solar hot water systems. In 2015 and 2016, rooftop solar systems supported by the ACT government's feed-in tariff had a capacity of 26.3 megawatts, producing 34,910 MWh. In the same year, retailer-supported schemes had a capacity of 25.2 megawatts and exported 28,815 MWh to the grid (power consumed locally was not recorded).

There are no wind-power generators in Canberra, but several have been built or are being built or planned in nearby New South Wales, such as the 140.7 megawatt Capital Wind Farm. The ACT government announced in 2013 that it was raising the target for electricity consumed in the ACT to be supplied from renewable sources to 90% by 2020, raising the target from 210 to 550 megawatts. It announced in February 2015 that three wind farms in Victoria and South Australia would supply 200 megawatts of capacity; these are expected to be operational by 2017. Contracts for the purchase of an additional 200 megawatts of power from two wind farms in South Australia and New South Wales were announced in December 2015 and March 2016. The ACT government announced in 2014 that up to 23 megawatts of feed-in-tariff entitlements would be made available for the establishment of a facility in the ACT or surrounding region for burning household and business waste to produce electricity by 2020.

== Twin towns and sister cities ==
Canberra has three sister cities:

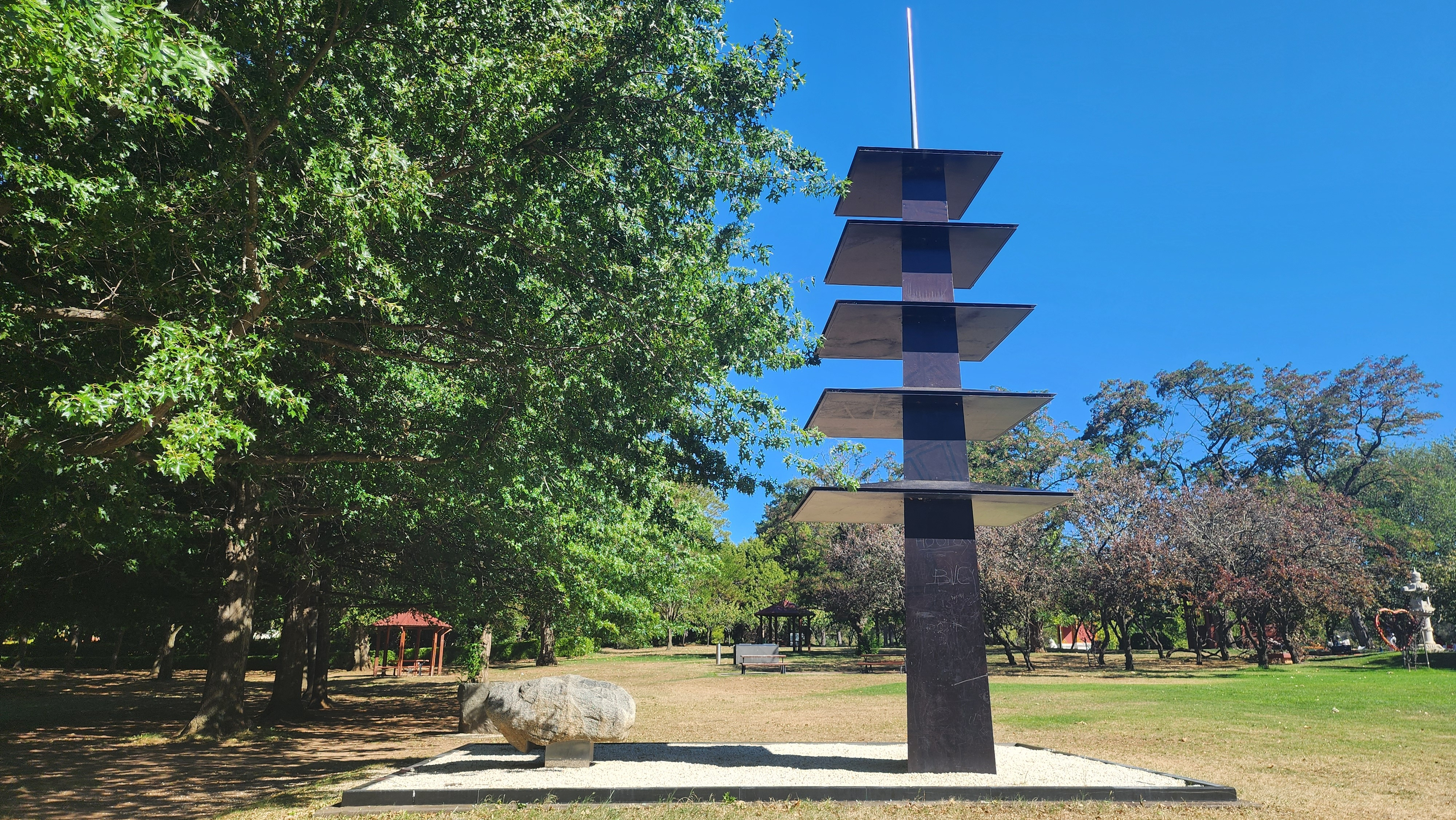
Toku in the Canberra-Nara Peace Park, which is located in the Lennox Gardens

- Beijing, China
- Nara, Japan
- Wellington, New Zealand

In addition, Canberra has the following friendship cities:

- Hangzhou, China: The ACT Government signed a Memorandum of Understanding with the Hangzhou Municipal People's Government on 29 October 1998. The Agreement was designed to promote business opportunities and cultural exchanges between the two cities.
- Dili, East Timor: The Canberra Dili Friendship Agreement was signed in 2004, aiming to build friendship and mutual respect and promote educational, cultural, economic, humanitarian and sporting links between Canberra and Dili.
- Nusantara, Indonesia: Australia's National Capital Authority and Indonesia's Nusantara Capital City Authority signed a Memorandum of Understanding (MoU) on cooperation. Nusantara and Canberra are both designed and planned national capitals, making the MoU particularly unique and relevant. The MoU covers potential exchanges of people and information, joint studies and exhibitions, and other cooperation. It extends on support that the Australian Government has already provided towards the development of Nusantara.

City-to-city relationships encourage communities and special interest groups both locally and abroad to engage in a wide range of exchange activities. The Canberra Nara Candle Festival held annually in spring, is a community celebration of the Canberra Nara Sister City relationship. The festival is held in Canberra Nara Park on the shores of Lake Burley Griffin.

== See also ==
- 1971 Canberra flood
- 2003 Canberra bushfires
- List of tallest buildings in Canberra
- List of public art in Canberra
