= Majura Parkway =

Road in Canberra, Australia

Majura Parkway Australian Capital Territory

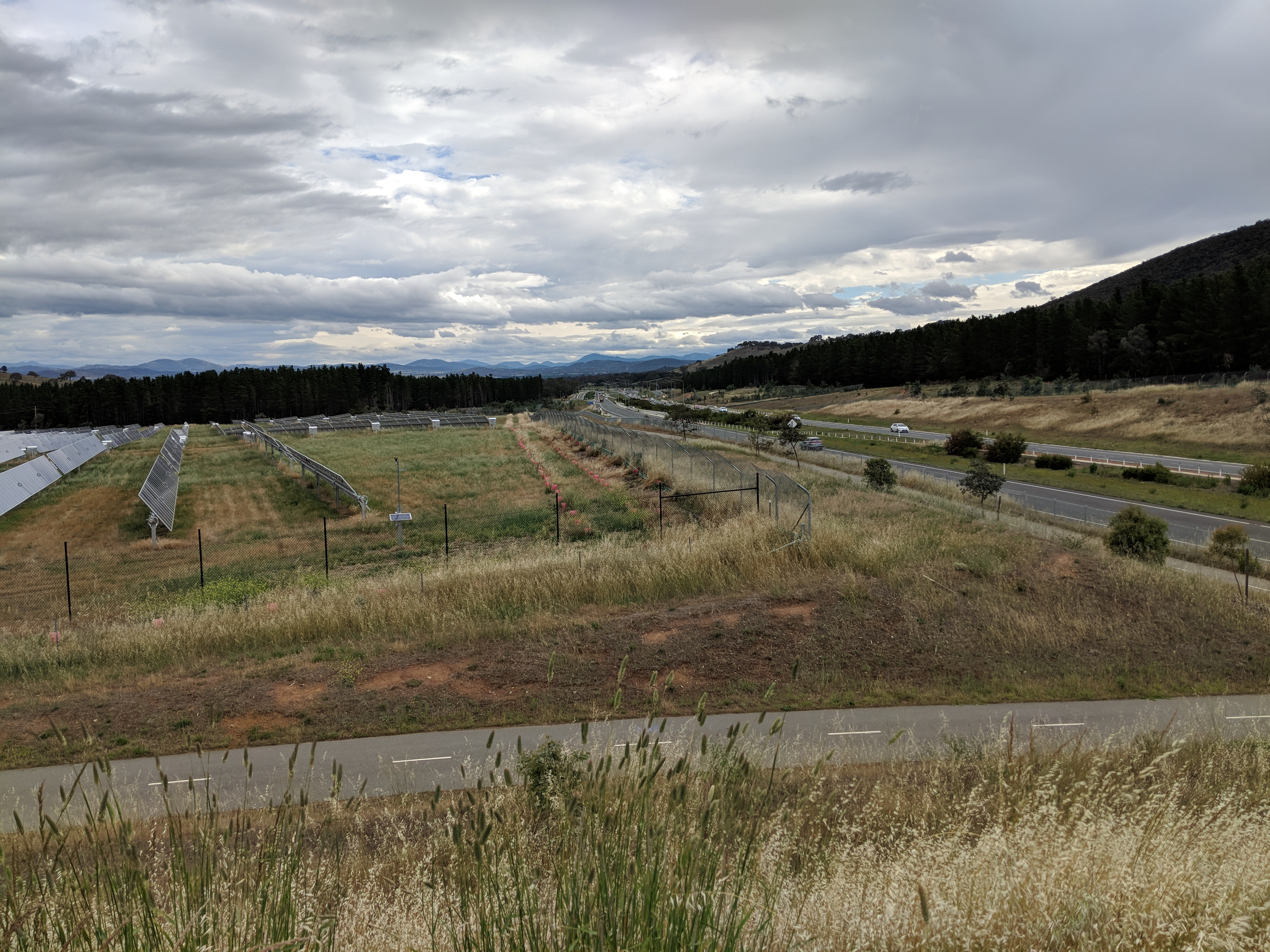

- Coordinates: 35.301669°S 149.173930°E (South end); 35.213828°S 149.187068°E (North end)

General information
- Type: Parkway
- Length: 11.5 km (7.1 mi)
- Opened: 20 April 2016
- Built by: Fulton Hogan
- Maintained by: Transport Canberra and City Services Directorate
- Route number(s): M23 (2016–present)

Major junctions
- South end: Monaro Highway; Fyshwick, Australian Capital Territory
- Fairbairn Avenue; Federal Highway
- North end: Horse Park Drive; Majura, Australian Capital Territory

Highway system
- Highways in Australia; National Highway • Freeways in Australia; Road infrastructure in Canberra

Majura Parkway is a 11.5-kilometre-long (7.1 mi) north–south parkway located in the Majura district of the Australian Capital Territory (ACT). It links the interchange with Federal Highway and Horse Park Drive at the edge of Gungahlin district to Monaro Highway in Fyshwick.

The parkway had been in planning since the 1970s and is considered an important access road to and from the Gungahlin district. The parkway provides a more efficient transport link in the area and conveys a large numbers of freight vehicles. The project was jointly funded by the ACT and Australian Governments, at a total cost of A$288 million.

== Route description ==
External videos
- Project flyover animations
- Majura Parkway Northbound on YouTube
- Majura Parkway Southbound on YouTube
- Majura Parkway Bridgework on YouTube

External image
- Area map
- Majura Valley area on Google Maps.

Majura Parkway traverses the length of the largely rural Majura Valley within the ACT, providing a parkway standard link between the northern terminus of Monaro Highway in the territory's east and Federal Highway in the north, close to the New South Wales border. Other benefits of the Majura Parkway include more efficient freight transportation, relieving traffic congestion, supporting future growth of Canberra Airport, and easier movement between Canberra's northern and southern suburbs.

The roadway starts as a continuation from the northern end of the Monaro Highway. It then crosses the Molonglo River, and Morshead Drive as part of a singular bridge structure, just to the west of the current Morshead Drive / Pialligo Avenue intersection. The next section of the parkway entirely replaces the northern arm of Morshead Drive with a raised section of roadway, before crossing over Fairbairn Road at the location of the current Morshead Drive / Fairbairn Road intersection.

From this point the roadway enters farmland, and grasslands; the parkway itself aligned just to the west of Woolshed Creek. Towards the northern end of the valley, the parkway bisects the Majura Pine Plantation. North of the plantation the parkway gains a service road along its western side, allowing southbound access via an overpass to businesses in that area. This service road continues a short distance to the north until it meets the access road to the Mount Majura air navigation facility, which is located atop the nearby Mount Majura.

The remainder of the roadway from the plantation to the north follows the previous Majura Road alignment, curving westwards to meet the existing interchange with Federal Highway. The roadway itself then continues on through the interchange into the Gungahlin district as Horse Park Drive.

The parkway is dual carriageway for the entirety of its length. Each traffic lane is 3.5-metre (11 ft) wide, with a 2.5-metre (8.2 ft) wide outside shoulder, and a 1-metre (3.3 ft) wide median shoulder. The speed limit is 100 km/h (60 mph). By 2030, the Majura Parkway is expected to carry approximately 40,000 vehicles each day, with 6,000 of those being freight vehicles. The stated cost is A$288 million, and is jointly funded by the ACT Government and the Australian Government, both committing $144 million to the project.

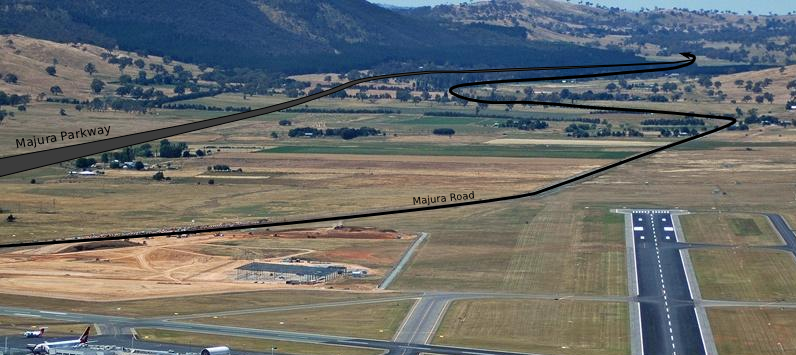
Artist's Impression of parts of Majura Parkway and Majura Road traversing Majura Valley. This image only shows approximate alignment, and does not include intersections or interchanges. Neither the northern or southern ends of the parkway are visible in this image.

== History ==
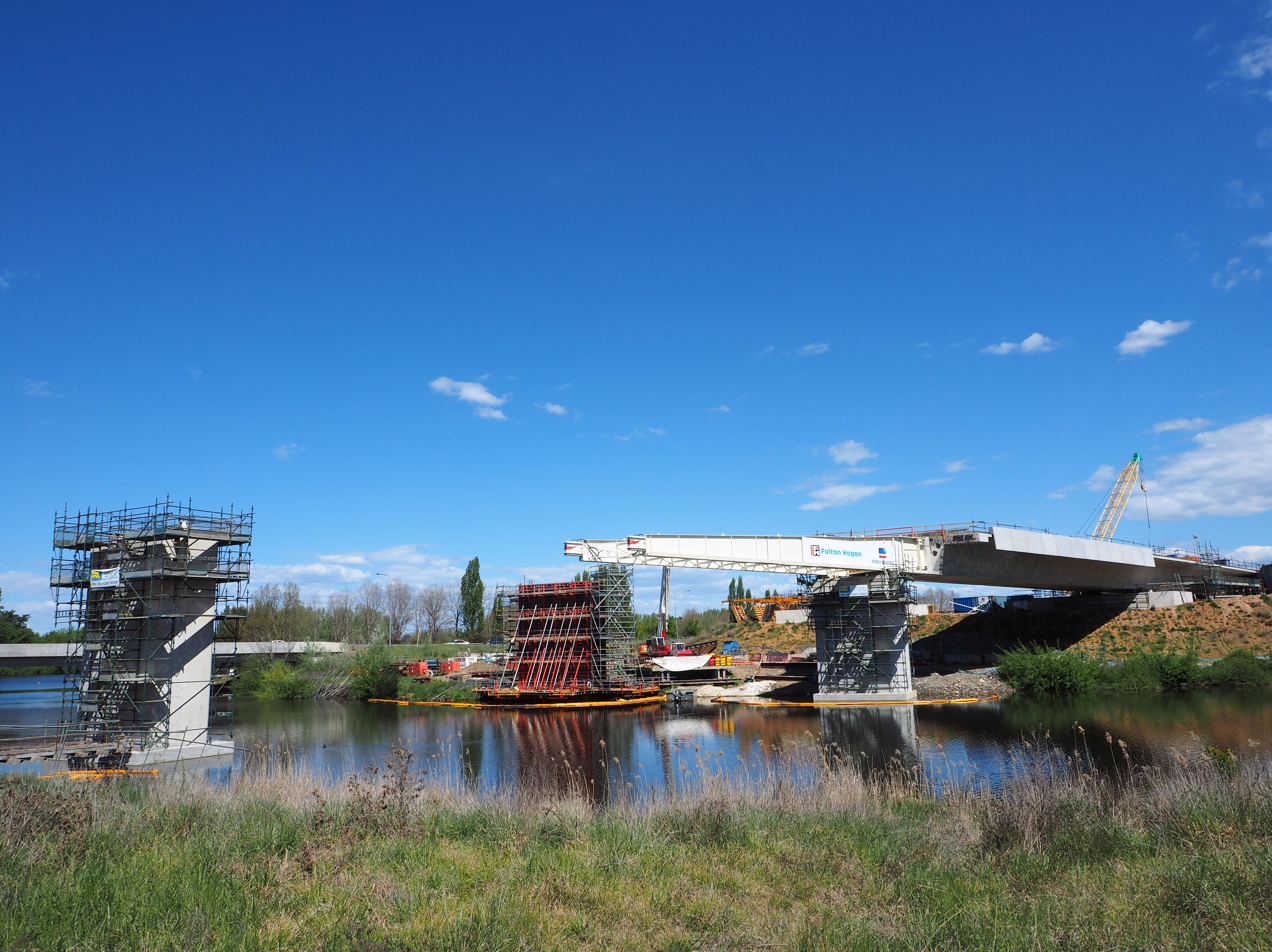
The Molonglo River bridge under construction in October 2014

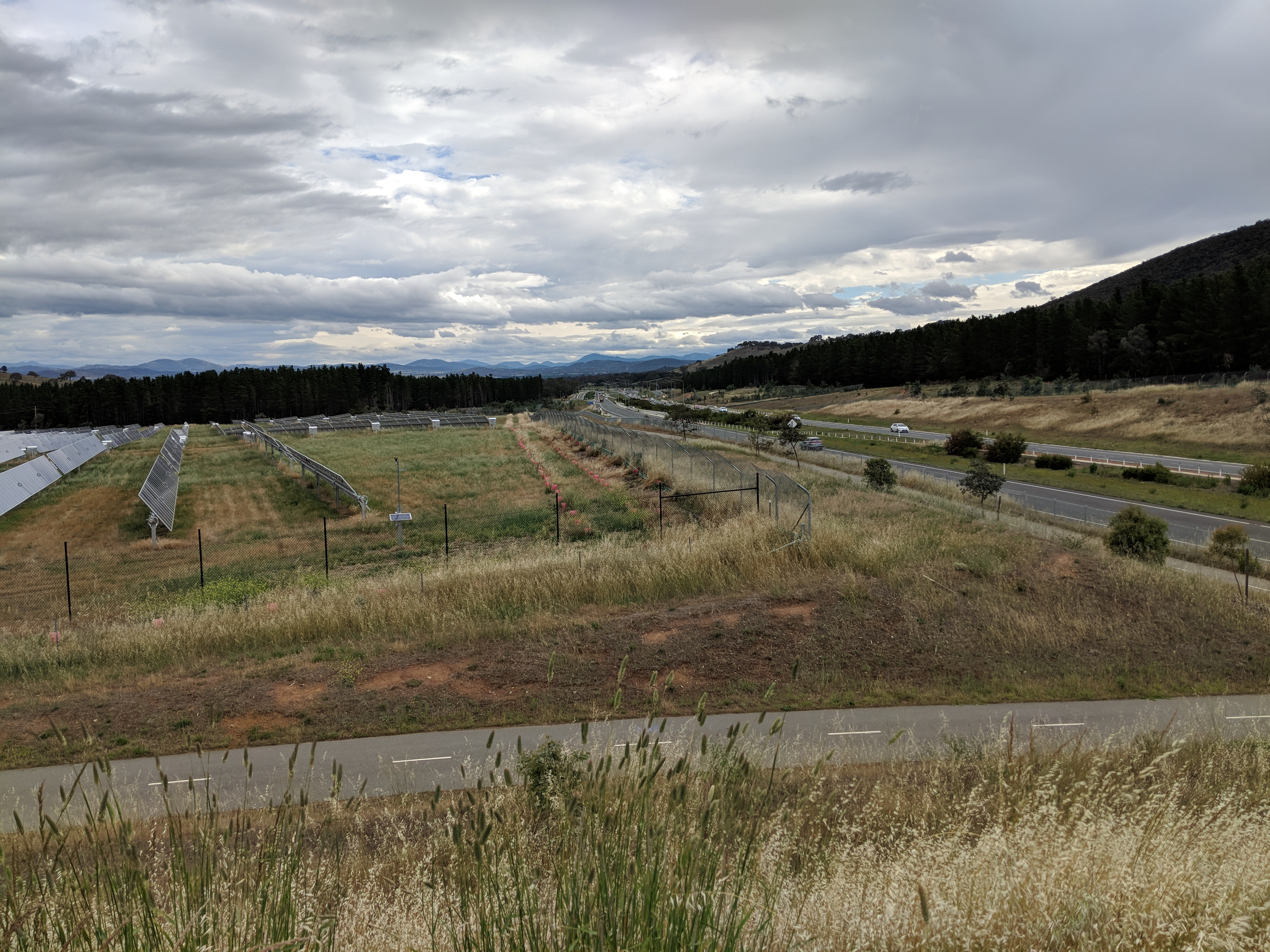
Majura Parkway and Mount Majura solar farm in 2017

The planning of Majura Parkway began with the Tomorrow's Canberra (1970) National Capital Development Commission (NCDC) report which identified the Majura Valley corridor as a component of Canberra's peripheral road system. Further NCDC and National Capital Authority (NCA) studies including Metropolitan Canberra (1984) and the Canberra Spatial Plan (2004) identified the need for a primary road link in the area. This was also backed up by the Gungahlin External Travel Study Information Report (1989) identifying four main access roads needed for residents of the Gungahlin district.

From the SMEC Concept Evaluation Report (2006), Roads ACT identified two preferred alignments, which were known as the western and the eastern alignments. The eastern alignment was later scrapped because of environmental, heritage, and social issues along that corridor, leaving the western alignment as the only preferred alignment. The scrapped eastern alignment would have also included a link to a future urban area in the Kowen District. Resumption of land for the parkway mostly involved farmland, although part of the Majura Pine Plantation was acquired for the new road alignment. The Royal Military College, Duntroon has also lost some parts of its playing fields, though the historic Oval No.1 is preserved.

Some concerns were raised about the parkway occupying land now used for offroad recreational cycling in the Majura Pine Plantation; however by the later stages of the planning process, two large culverts had been planned in this area which would ease access between both sides of the plantation for recreational cyclists and other users. Concerns were also raised by the Geological Society of Australia in regards to the construction works affecting a fossil site on Woolshed Creek in the vicinity of the Fairbairn Avenue southbound offramp. The Geological Society of Australia later accepted assurances from the ACT Government that the site would be protected.

Preparatory roadworks on nearby roads began in 2008, with the main project beginning in September 2012 when Fulton Hogan was awarded the contract to build. Major construction then began in January 2013, creating around 350 jobs.

The end of construction for the Majura Parkway project was formally announced on Friday 22 April 2016, coinciding with the naming of the Malcolm Fraser Bridge, the most prominent feature of the project, which runs over the Molonglo River. The bridge's name was unveiled by Tamara 'Tamie' Fraser, wife of the former Prime Minister. The off-ramp to Meddhung Road linking to the Majura shopping precinct was opened later on 22 December 2017.

Majura Parkway has now largely replaced Majura Road, which was formerly the main route through the valley and carried approximately 18,000 vehicles each day, but as a single carriageway rural road, lacked capacity to cope with future increases in traffic. The need for its replacement with a more efficient, higher capacity roadway was highlighted in several studies. The southern alignment of Majura Road remains largely intact to serve local traffic to various facilities located in the Majura Valley, multiple rural properties and Canberra Airport's business precinct.

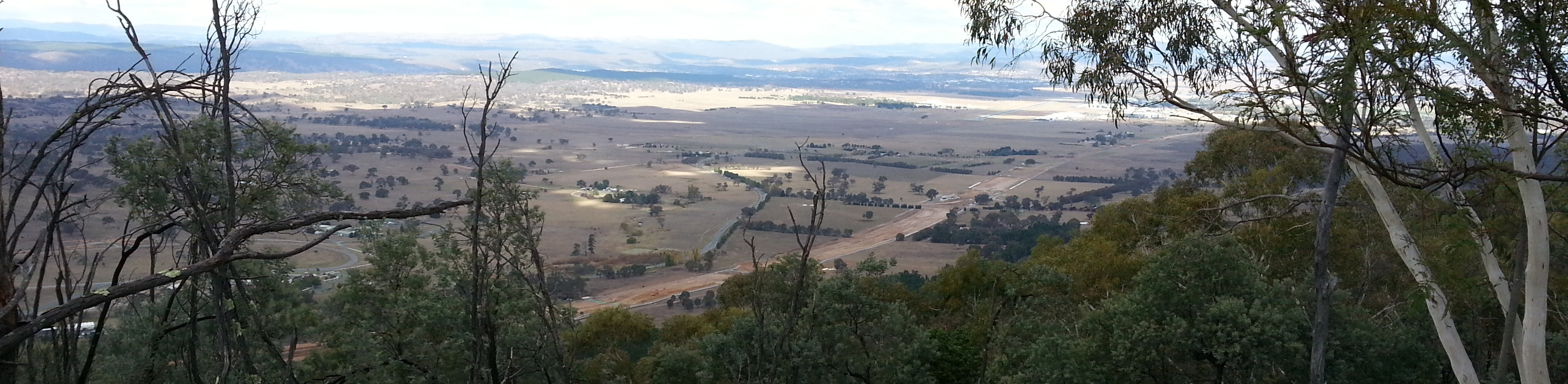
Majura Parkway construction works, as of mid-April 2013

== Interchanges ==
District	Location	km	mi	Destinations	Notes
Canberra Central	Fyshwick	0	0.0	Monaro Highway (M23 south) – Fyshwick, Cooma	Southern terminus of parkway, route M23 continues south along Monaro Highway
Molonglo River		0.6	0.37	Malcolm Fraser Bridge	
Canberra Central–Majura border	Campbell–Pialligo border	0.7	0.43	Morshead Drive (west) – Civic, Campbell; Pialligo Road (east) – Queanbeyan, Canberra Airport	Half diamond interchange, northbound exit, southbound entry only
Canberra Central–Majura border	Campbell–Pialligo border	1.0	0.62	Fairbairn Avenue – Civic, Campbell, Queanbeyan, Canberra Airport	Diamond interchange
Canberra Central–Majura border	Pialligo	1.8	1.1	Meddhung Road – Majura Park Shopping Centre	Southbound exit only
Majura		7.3	4.5	Tambreet Street – AFP Training Facility, Innabaanya Girl Guide Camp, Majura Training Area	Diamond interchange
Majura		8.9	5.5	Majura Road – Majura Defence Range	Southbound access via LILO T-intersection
Majura		9.7	6.0	Mount Majura Road – Mount Majura air navigation facility	Northbound access via LILO T-intersection
Majura		10.4	6.5	Hector McIntosh Grove – Shooting ranges	Southbound access via LILO T-intersection
Majura–Gungahlin border		11.5	7.1	Federal Highway (M23 north, A23 south) – Civic, Lyneham, Sydney, Goulburn	Diamond interchange with single cloverleaf offramp, allows non-stop access to both directions of Federal Highway; Route M23 continues north along Federal Highway
Majura–Gungahlin border		11.5	7.1	Horse Park Drive (west) – Gungahlin	Northern terminus of parkway: continues west as Horse Park Drive
Incomplete access

Map depicting the Majura Parkway and adjoining roads post-completion
