= Majura =

Majura may refer to:

== Australia ==
- Majura (district) of the Australian Capital Territory
- Mount Majura in the Australian Capital Territory

== India ==
- Majura, Gujarat
