= Canberra Central =

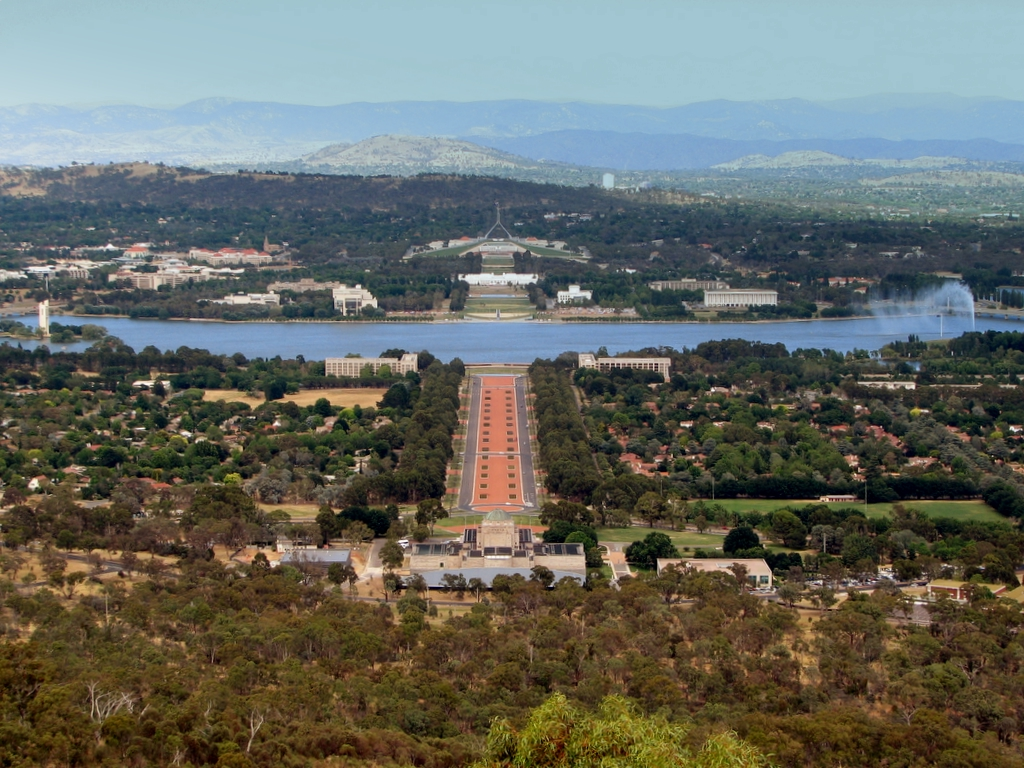
- Partial view of the Parliamentary Triangle, Canberra

- Interactive map of Canberra Central
- Coordinates: 35°17′35″S 149°07′37″E
- Country: Australia
- State: Australian Capital Territory

Government
  - Territory electorates: Kurrajong; Murrumbidgee
  - Federal division: Canberra

Population
  - Total: 92,780 (2021 census)
- Gazetted: 12 May 1966
Localities around Canberra Central
Belconnen	Gungahlin	Majura
Belconnen	Canberra Central	Majura
Weston Creek	Woden Valley	Jerrabomberra

Canberra Central is a district in the Australian Capital Territory in Australia. Consisting of both the subdivisions of North Canberra and South Canberra. The district is subdivided into divisions (suburbs), sections and blocks. The district of Canberra Central lies entirely within the bounds of the city of Canberra, the capital city of Australia.

== Establishment and governance ==
The traditional custodians of the district are the indigenous people of the Ngunawal tribe.

Following the transfer of land from the Government of New South Wales to the Commonwealth Government in 1911, the district was established in 1966 by the Commonwealth via the gazettal of the Districts Ordinance 1966 (Cth) which, after the enactment of the Australian Capital Territory (Self-Government) Act 1988, became the Districts Act 1966. This Act was subsequently repealed by the Government of the Australian Capital Territory and the district is now administered subject to the Districts Act 2002.

== Location and urban structure ==
The district of Central Canberra is a set of contiguous residential suburbs consolidated around Lake Burley Griffin, together with a town centre located in Canberra City, and a range of commercial suburbs, some of which form parts of the Parliamentary Triangle and contain many of Canberra's national monuments and institutions. The district is often known as two separate parts, being the Inner North and Inner South. While some of the other districts in the Australian Capital Territory and within the city of Canberra are well known (e.g. Belconnen, Gungahlin, Tuggeranong, Weston Creek, Woden Valley) Canberra Central would less often be thought of as a district outside of its administrative use: more often as the Inner North and Inner South. The district of Canberra Central is mentioned in various ACT legislation.

Canberra Central is bounded on the north by the Gungahlin district, the east by the Majura district, the south-east by the Jerrabomberra district (as distinct from the suburb of Jerrabomberra that lies within the Queanbeyan local government area within New South Wales), the south by the district of the Woden Valley, the south-west by the Weston Creek district, and the west and north-west by the Belconnen district.

=== Inner North ===
The Inner North includes the inner north subdivisions (suburbs) of Acton, Ainslie, Braddon, Campbell, City, Dickson, Downer, Hackett, Lyneham, O'Connor, Reid, Russell, Turner and Watson (except for the very north end near the Australian Heritage Village which is in the Majura district). Part of the nature park to the east and south of Mount Majura is also in the Inner North. It also includes Black Mountain and the land south of Lady Denman Drive around Yarramundi Reach, near Lake Burley Griffin.

=== Inner South ===
The Inner South includes the inner south subdivisions (suburbs) of Barton, Capital Hill, Deakin, Forrest, Fyshwick, Griffith, Kingston, Narrabundah, Parkes, Red Hill (except for the Federal Golf Course which is in Woden Valley district) and Yarralumla.

== Height limit ==
The maximum height of buildings in Canberra Central is 617 metres (2,024 ft) above sea level, generally about 50 metres (160 ft) above ground level in Canberra City, in compliance with the RL617 rule in the National Capital Authority's National Capital Plan. As a result, the highest buildings are now found in the outer town centres, such as Phillip and Belconnen.

The National Capital Development Commission (NCDC) first introduced height controls in Civic in 1968. The NCDC adopted an absolute limit of RL617, being the intended height of the Towers of the New Parliament House on Camp Hill. In January 1989, only the slender flagpole element was higher than the buildings in Civic., however this contradicts a 1972 NCDC report.

Until recently before 1972, a controlling height limit of RL2000 feet was in use, which "corresponds with the top of Capital Hill". This was exceeded by the AMP Building, with a height of RL2025 feet. (Note: The roof of the eastern 10 story block of the Defence Headquarters building group in Russell was at RL2025 feet, "equal to that of the AMP Building".) Recommendation 9 of a 1972 National Capital Development Commission study (made "under the auspices of the Architectural Division") was "that the height of buildings in the national area and city be restricted to a maximum at RL 2025" (2025 feet rounds down to 617 metres). The report did not aim to "dig deep or follow out any of the ramifications of the subject", and claimed:

No amount of high building will alter the fact that Canberra is one of the world's horizontal cities. The cumulative effect of topography, Griffin's lay-out, and the Australian preference for low densities, will preserve this characteristic in perpetuity.

This 1972 report stated general restraint on building heights in central Canberra was required to ensure "both protection of the hills and safeguarding of the supremacy of Parliament House. It claimed that the existence or proposal of high buildings in Woden and Belconnen are "not the result of pressure from government or from outside" but "have been deliberately conceived, introduced, and in some cases already built, for an architectural purpose; namely, to distinguish the town centres and to create in them an appropriate and focal urban atmosphere." As Parliament House was assumed to be on Camp Hill, the 1972 report suggested reservation of a group of unrestricted height buildings "beyond Kingston", to satisfy potential future demand or community desire but "'round the corner' and out of sight from the main front of a Parliament House":

Apart from the tendency of the public to desire high buildings as an antidote to Canberra's horizontality and as a sign of its being a 'real' city, there may well be, in future, a demand for types of buildings such as hotels where vertical repetition is functionally justified and architecturally appropriate.

The National Capital Development Commission's 1984 Metropolitan Canberra Policy Plan Development Plan assessed options of a concentrated plan or a dispersed plan for Canberra. A 1985 report stated the NCDC had decided to adopt the dispersed plan. The 1989 Civic Centre Canberra Policy Plan claimed there was "no compelling reason why the current height limit of RL 617 should be abandoned other than to allow freedom for developers".

The RL617 limit was still valid in 1989 (Note: Note - there is also the similarly named February 1984 Civic Centre Policy Plan and Development Plan.), and is still valid as of 2026.

ABC News reported that in 1990, the National Capital Authority set the height limit in the inaugural National Capital Plan.

The top of the Parliament House roof slab/terrace was set at RL617. RL617 "is equal to the base of the flag pole of Parliament House".

== Demographics ==
At the 2021 census, there were 92,780 people in the Canberra Central district. Population growth in the Canberra Central district between the 2001 census and the 2006 census was 3.5%; in the five years to the 2011 census, the population grew by 9.7%; in the five years to the 2016 census, the population grew by 10.8%; and in the five years to the 2021 census, the population grew by 16.0%. Population growth in Canberra Central was slower than the national average during the first five years (the national average was 5.8%), but it has been significantly faster since (the national average was 8.3, 8.8% and 8.6% respectively in the last three periods). The median weekly income for residents within the Canberra Central district was significantly higher than the national average.

Selected historical census data for the Canberra Central district
Census year		2001	2006	2011	2016	2021
Population	Estimated residents on census night	63,577	65,781	72,184	80,009	92,780
Population	District rank in terms of size within the Australian Capital Territory	3rd	3rd	3rd	3rd	▲2nd
Population	Percentage of the Australian Capital Territory population			20.2%	20.1%	20.5%
Population	Percentage of the Australian population	0.34%	▼0.33%	▲0.34%	0.34%	▲0.36%
Cultural and language diversity						
Ancestry, top responses	English			32.7%	33.7%	34.2%
Ancestry, top responses	Australian			32.4%	28.7%	29.9%
Ancestry, top responses	Irish			14.0%	14.6%	14.0%
Ancestry, top responses	Scottish			10.7%	11.2%	11,5%
Ancestry, top responses	Chinese			4.8%		6.9%
Language, top responses (other than English)	Mandarin	0.9%	▲1.6%	▲2.7%	▲4.1%	▼3.8%
Language, top responses (other than English)	Vietnamese	0.7%	▲0.8%	▲1.0%		
Language, top responses (other than English)	Greek	1.1%	▼0.9%	▲1.0%		
Language, top responses (other than English)	Italian	1.3%	▼1.1%	▼1.0%		
Language, top responses (other than English)	Cantonese	n/c	▲0.9%	▲1.0%	1.0%	
Religious affiliation						
Religious affiliation, top responses	No Religion	24.7%	▲29.3%	▲36.2%	▲44.3%	▲52.2%
Religious affiliation, top responses	Catholic	24.0%	▼23.4%	▼20.8%	▼17.2%	▼15.3%
Religious affiliation, top responses	Anglican	17.4%	▼15.0%	▼12.7%	▼11.5%	▼8.1%
Religious affiliation, top responses	Uniting Church	4.2%	▼3.7%	▼3.1%		
Religious affiliation, top responses	Buddhism	n/c	▲2.6%	▲3.1%		
Median weekly incomes						
Personal income	Median weekly personal income		A$781	A$1,013	A$1,078	A$1,363
Personal income	Percentage of Australian median income		167.6%	▲175.6%	▼139.8%	▲154.2%
Family income	Median weekly family income		A$2,058	A$2,652	A$2,825	A$3,362
Family income	Percentage of Australian median income		175.7%	▼141.9%	▲152.5%	▲149.8%
Household income	Median weekly household income		A$1,521	A$2,101	A$2,100	A$2,467
Household income	Percentage of Australian median income		148.1%	▲170.2%	▼137.8%	▲134.1%
