= Majura Road =

Road in Canberra, Australia

Majura Road Australian Capital Territory
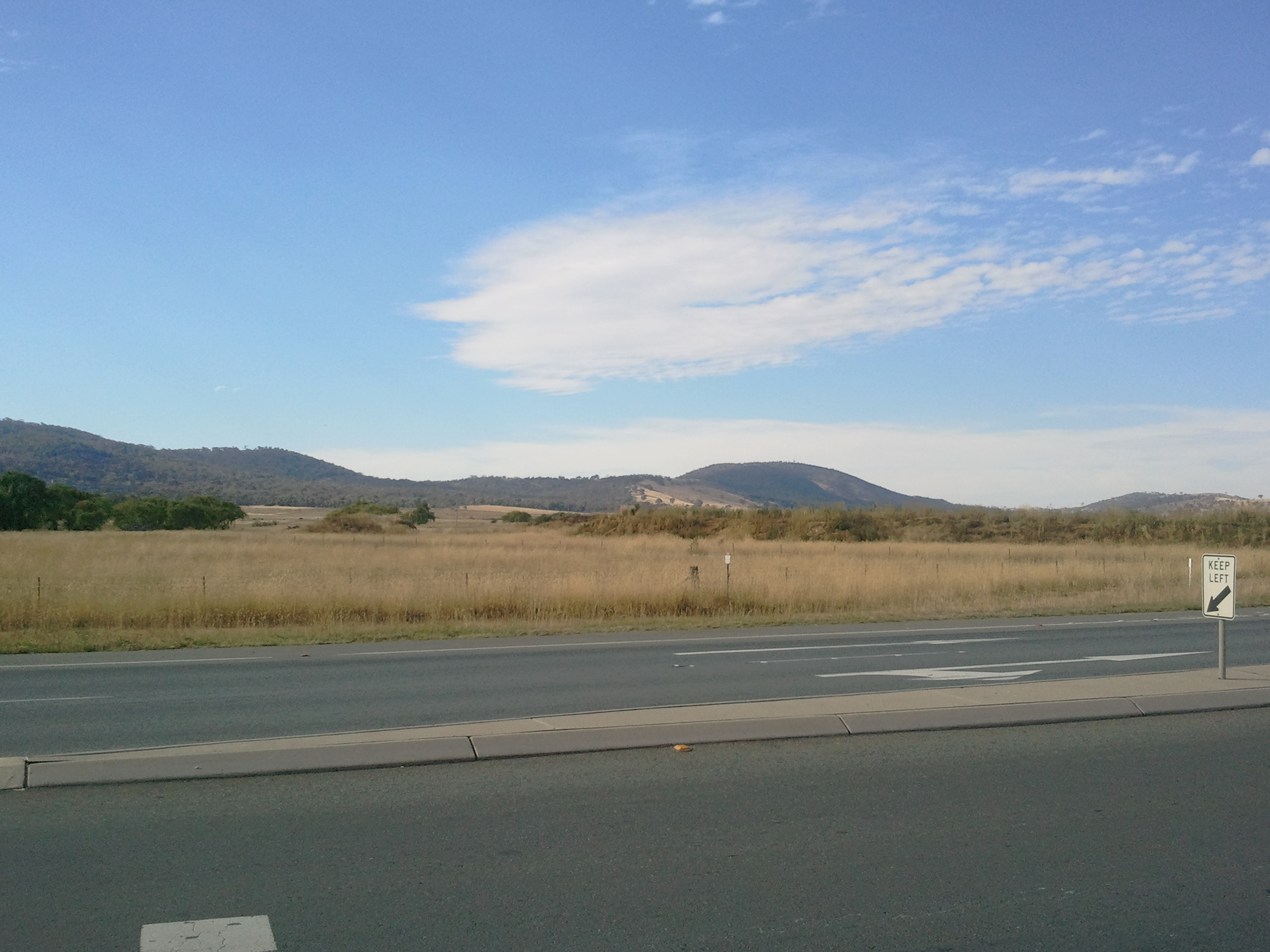
- Majura Road in January 2013

General information
- Type: Road
- Length: 11.1 km (6.9 mi)
- Former route number: Alternate National Route 23 (1991–2016)

Major junctions
- North end: Horse Park Drive; Majura, Australian Capital Territory
- Federal Highway
- South end: Fairbairn Avenue; Pialligo, Australian Capital Territory

Location(s)
- District: Majura

Majura Road is a major arterial road in the eastern rural area of Canberra, the capital city of Australia. The road runs north to south, beginning at a grade separated junction with the Federal Highway 1 km (0.62 mi) inside the border of the Australian Capital Territory. The route followed by the road passes to the east of Mount Majura and mostly rural and industrial properties including the Majura Training Area, Mount Majura Winery and a training facility for the Australian Federal Police towards the Majura Park development at Canberra Airport where it ends at Fairbairn Avenue. The road provides a convenient bypass of the city's Inner North from the Gungahlin district to Queanbeyan. Canberra Airport and the Monaro Highway. The route is signposted as an alternative to National Highway 23, the main route between Sydney and the Snowy Mountains and carries considerable volumes of heavy vehicle and tourist traffic.

Majura Road was upgraded during the 1990s from a basic rural road to a single carriageway highway standard road with a speed limit of 90 km/h (56 mph). The current interchange with the Federal Highway was completed in December 2002 and redesigned in 2004 to connect with Horse Park Drive as a continuation of the route towards Gungahlin.

In 2005 the Federal and Territory governments began planning to substantially upgrade the route. Construction of the $288 million Majura Parkway began in 2013 and was completed in 2016, offering a freeway-grade bypass of central Canberra. The Majura Parkway subsumed some of the northern alignment of Majura Road; the existing parts have been retained for local traffic and as the main access route to the Majura Park Shopping Centre and business precinct.

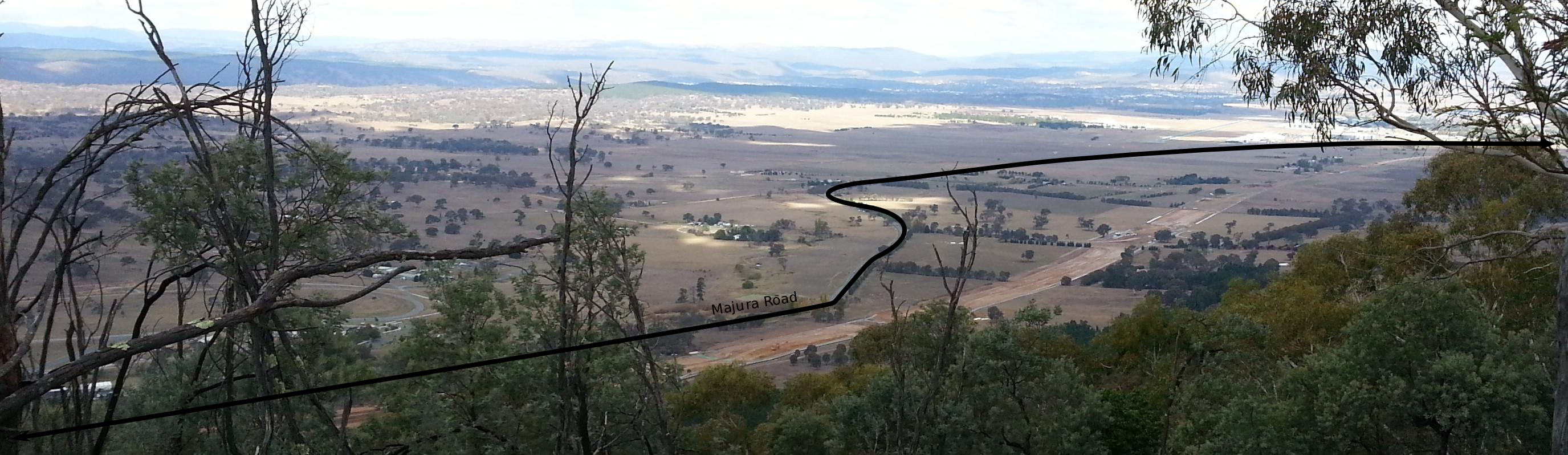
Majura Road alignment traversing the Majura Valley, the entire extent of the road is not visible; construction works in image are for the Majura Parkway.

== See also ==
- Majura Parkway
