= Majura Training Area =

Military training area in the Australian Capital Territory

Coordinates: 35.323109°S 149.239612°E

The Majura Training Area (MTA) is a facility belonging to the Australian Department of Defence located to the east of Mount Majura in the Majura district in the Australian Capital Territory, Australia. The MTA is operated by the Australian Army for the conduct of field exercises and weapon qualification shoots. The MTA is located near to the Royal Military College, Duntroon and the Australian Defence Force Academy and is frequently used by these training establishments. Accommodation and support on the range is through 'Camp Blake', which consists of headquarters buildings, Q-Store, Mess, Staff accommodation and amenities and trainee accommodation and amenities.

The MTA contains a number of shooting ranges including the 600m Marksmanship Training Range (MTR), 25m Pistol range, Grenade range and multiple other ranges. Artillery ranges are also situated on the site and are designated as danger areas due to the risk of unexploded ordnance.

== History ==
The decision to locate the Royal Military College Duntroon in the Australian Capital Territory, the then Federal Capital Territory, required the acquisition of land for the college and for field training areas. Initially the Duntroon Estate of Robert Campbell (Australian politician, born 1796) was leased by Defence on 7 November 1910. This only included the buildings and the approximately 350 acres (142 hectares) of land in the vicinity. The college was then opened on 25 Jun 1911. The whole of the Duntroon Estate was acquired by the Government in a larger acquisition of freehold (Freehold (law) land so that it could be converted to leasehold owned by the Commonwealth. In the Majura Valley, the Duntroon Estate was the largest land holding, but only included the south-western portion of the valley and only included a small area of the most southern parts of the current Majura Training Area. The remaining Freehold land in the Majura Valley was acquired by the Government in stages, being completed by approximately 1917. The majority of the land acquired by the Government was excess to Commonwealth requirements and was leased back to the community for farming purposes.

=== Royal Military College, Duntroon Manoeuvre Area and Pialligo rifle range (Mount Ainslie) ===
The lack of field training areas including a rifle range was noted in an initial report on the college. This was remedied with the construction of a classification rifle range on the southern slopes on Mount Ainslie to the west of and in approximate alignment withe the existing Mount Ainslie Drive. This range was opened on 14 Aug 1914 and was commonly referred to as the "Pialligo Range". A declaration was then made on 18 August 1915 to create the Royal Military College, Duntroon Manoeuvre Area/College Reserve of approximately 1600 acres (650 hectares) encompassing the rifle range and an area from:

- at approximately the modern intersection of Fairbairn Avenue and Mount Ainslie Drive, a line following northerly along the natural ridge to the summit of Mount Ainslie then
- north-easterly for one mile then
- south-easterly to the Woolshed Creek for one mile and then
- easterly to the Majura Road then southerly along that reload until it meets the Yass-Queanbeyan Road (now Fairbairn Avenue) then
- along the Yass-Queanbeyan Road (now Fairbairn Avenue) to the point of commencement. This area had been fenced by a rabbit proof fence for public safety.

The area represents the first permanent field firing and manoeuvre area the Federal Capital.

=== Other manoeuvre areas in the ACT ===
Other permanent and temporary declarations were made for the Military to give them authority to enter upon and use land for training, manoeuvres or other military purposes were declared with the Australian Capital Territory which was at that time mostly rural farm, natural grasslands and woodland. This included:

- A temporary authority issued on 20 January 1914 for access between 2 February and 7 March 1914 for the Royal Military College to conduct its annual camp at Yarralumla, Australian Capital Territory at Yarralumla House which is now Government House, Canberra. The camp would also include an artillery practice from the southern slopes of Green Hill (modern Dairy Farmers Hill and the National Arboretum Canberra towards the ridge lines either side of Coppins Crossing.
- A temporary authority issued 22 February 1913 for access between 18 February and 28 March which was for the first military encampment in the Australian Capital Territory, being for the 3rd Light Horse Brigade and encompassed all the land that had been transferred to the new territory noting that some was still in freehold possession.
- A permanent authority issued on 29 November 1917 for access to land:
  - "all that piece or parcel of land situate in the Federal Territory, county of Murray, and within the parishes of Weetangera, Ginninderra, Canberra, Narrabundah, and Yarrolumla, commencing at the intersection of the north-western boundary of, the Federal Territory with the right bank of the Murrumbidgee River, and bounded thence on the north-west by part of the north-western boundary of the Federal Territory aforesaid to the Yass-Queanbeyan road (modern alignment of the Barton Highway/Limestone Avenue; thence on the north-east by that road to its intersection with the Canberra-Narrabundah road; on the east by the Canberra-Narrabundah road (modern alignment of Mugga Mugga Lane) to its intersection with the Urayarra-Queanbeyan road (possibly the Long Gulley Road), thence on the south by that road to the Murrumbidgee River; on the west by that river to the point of commencement"
  - This would allow the Royal Military College, Duntroon a further artillery practice 29–30 November 1920 at Green Hill, this time at targets between Coppins Crossing and Deep Creek one mile North of the Molonglo River.

==== Majura Valley declared part of the permanent manoeuvre area ====
It was not until 1920 that a permanent order was issued that pushed the eastern boundary of military access to Sutton Road to encompassed the current Majura Training Area. A further permanent order was declared on 17 November 1921 that also included the parish of Goorooyarroo located to the north of the Australian Capital Territory border possibly to accommodate an RMC artillery practice near Sutton, New South Wales. The Royal Military College Duntroon however would remain using the Mount Ainslie Manoeuvre area and there is no evidence they used land in the vicinity of the Majura Training Area.

==== Artillery practice at the Woolshed paddocks ====
Live artillery practice would commence in the Mount Ainslie manoeuvre area on 23 November 1922. The artillery range was situated in the Woolshed paddocks, from the rise near the Duntroon Woolshed, firing at targets placed due north to a distance of 2750 metres (the area is the current West Majura Grasslands). The use of the whole Manoeuvre would continue until the Royal Military College Duntroon relocated to Sydney in 1931 during the depression .

The Royal Military College Duntroon relocated back to the Australian Capital Territory in 1937. It is in the period 18-19 Nov that the first use of the Majura Training Area is recorded with the danger area described as being bounded by the roads Duntroon-Queanbeyan (Pialligo Avenue) Queanbeyan-Sutton (Sutton Road) Federal High-way and Majura Lane (Majura Road). The entry of Australian in to World War II 3 September 1939 would see increasing use of the area as a range, noting that the area was being used as leasehold farmland and access for the military was through permanent or temporary authorities to enter the land when required.

=== Air Gunnery Range, Canberra (Majura) ===
On 5 February 1941 the requirement for the Royal Australian Air Force for a live firing range catering to aircraft at the Canberra Aerodrome led to "Air Gunnery Range, Canberra" being declared in the north of the Majura Valley and extending into New South Wales:

- All that piece or parcel of land in the Parishes of Goorooyarroo and Pialligo, County of Murray, in the Australian Capital Territory and the State of New South Wales, situated approximately 41/2 miles north east of Canberra, and bounded by lines commencing at a point 2,460 ft. distant and of a bearing of 50° 0' from the " Plains Trigonometric Station " thence successively 1,200 ft.—8° 13', 35,242 ft.—338° 13', 17,042 ft.—08° 13', 15,242 ft.—218° 13', 1,200 ft.—188° 13', 1,800 ft.—278° 13', to the point of commencement.
- A subsequent order on 6 February 1914 declared that air gunnery practices would take place any anytime during the day without any further special notices.
- The previous boundaries of the range proclaimed in 1941 were revoked 28 February 1945 and a new boundary was proclaimed.
- The previous range boundaries proclaimed 1945 were revoked and a new range boundaries were declared 4 August 1952.
- The range was finally rescinded on 6 November 1970

==== Bombing Range, Canberra (Tuggeranong) ====
A practice bombing range had also been established in the Tuggeranong Valley on 5 February 1941, within the modern suburbs of Isabella Plains, Australian Capital Territory and Bonython, Australian Capital Territory and would be extensively used until the end of World War II but was only released as a range in May 1952.

=== RMC Manoeuvre Area and Artillery Range (Majura) ===
At the end of World War II local leaseholders in the Majura Valley began to complain about the frequent use of their land by the military. It was decided that a permanent range should be established for the military which would also allow local farmers grazing rights. Negotiations were also required with the Canberra Aerodrome to ensure the safety of aircraft when landing or taking off. On 1 September 1949 leaseholders had their land withdrawn from their leases to create the Royal Military College Duntroon Manoeuvre Area and Artillery Range the borders which mostly align to the modern Majura Training Area.

=== Closure of Mount Ainslie training area ===
With the expansion of Canberra and the introduction of more powerful weapons into the Army it was decided to close the Royal Military College Duntroon Manoeuvre Area in favour of the training area in Majura. This occurred in 1962 with the rifle range being handed to the civilian Canberra Rifle Club who would operate the range until it was closed in 1968 to develop a new road (Mount Ainslie Road) to the summit of Mount Ainslie. The construction of a new mechanical rifle range, record proficiency range and associated roads and buildings at Majura had commenced in 1960 and were completed in 1962.

=== Majura Field Firing Range/Majura Training Area ===
The Majura Field Firing Range and boundaries were declared on 30 Jul 1987 in the Commonwealth of Australia Gazette No GN 14 5 August 1987. The area was subsequently refined and declared the Majura Training Area with the issues of: Defence Practice Areas (Revocation, amendment and declaration) 2011 (No. 1) Schedule 2 Part 3 Majura Training Area
