= Majura (district) =

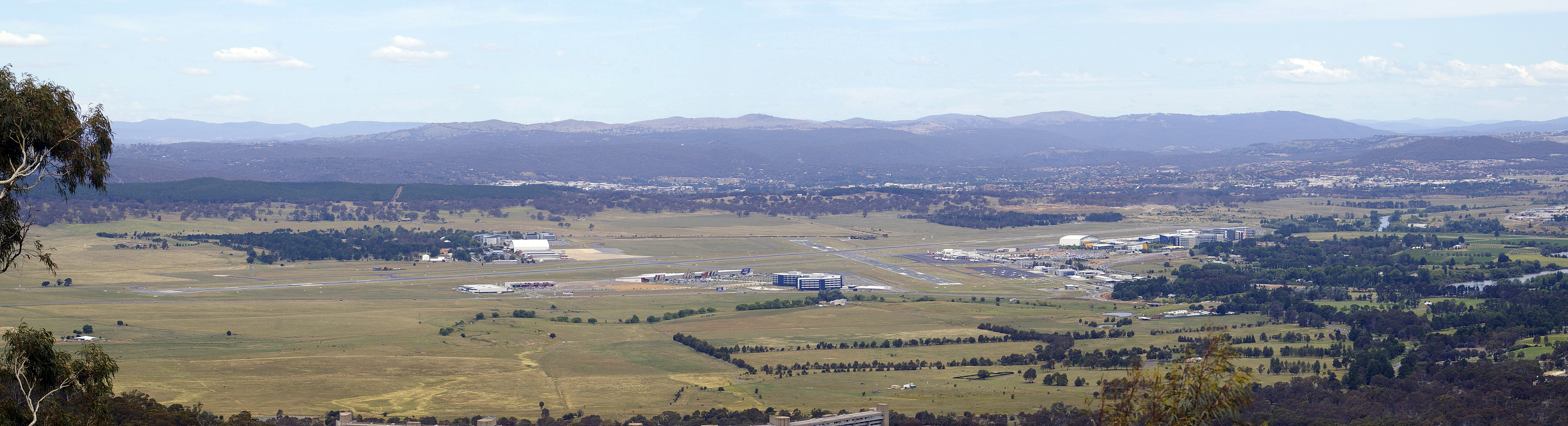
- View of Canberra Airport in southern Majura, the district of Majura largely lies to the left of the image.

- Interactive map of Majura
- Coordinates: 35°16′15″S 149°11′52″E
- Country: Australia
- State: Australian Capital Territory

Government
  - Territory electorate: Kurrajong
  - Federal division: Canberra

Area
  - Total: 95.2 km^{2} (36.8 sq mi)

Population
  - Total: 161 (2021 census)
  - Density: 1.691/km^{2} (4.380/sq mi)
- Postcode: 2609
Localities around Majura
Gungahlin	Sutton	Wamboin
Canberra Central	Majura	Kowen
Canberra Central	Jerrabomberra	Queanbeyan

Majura is a district in the Australian Capital Territory in Australia. With a population of 161 at the 2021 census, excluding the suburb of Pialligo, which lies to the south of Canberra Airport. Apart from Pialligo, Majura District includes Canberra Airport, three business parks and some farming but little residential development. The main shopping centre is the Majura Park Shopping Centre.

== Geography ==
The Majura District is situated in the northeast corner of the ACT, to the east of the Canberra Central district, Mount Ainslie and Mount Majura, north of the Molonglo River, west of Sutton Road and south of the New South Wales border. It is located in the Majura Valley, which is drained by Woolshed Creek. Majura is primarily covered by the Majura Field Firing Range, open grazing country and Canberra Airport. Majura Parkway, which was officially opened on 22 April 2016, and Majura Road run through it from the north to the south. Majura District is not generally zoned for residential development, partly because of the nearby airport. Its only significant settlement is Pialligo, which lies on its southern edge and is semi-rural in character.

The Majura Park Gun Club and Australian Federal Police driver training facilities are located on the northern part of Majura Road and a forensic facility is being built. The Majura Vineyard is located further south and includes the Mount Majura Solar Farm. The Majura Park Shopping Centre is on airport land at the southern end of Majura Road. A large IKEA store opened on non-airport land opposite the Airport on Majura Road on 16 November 2015. The Royal Military College, Duntroon and the Australian Defence Force Academy lie to the south of Fairbairn Avenue on the edge of the Majura district.

In 2011, the Majura district contains 14 rural holdings in a thin strip along Majura Road between the nature reserves to the west and the defence, Airport and AFP land to the east. It was observed that "no-one in the Valley is a farmer, as they don’t receive their main income from farming." However, since 2011 properties such as Majura House have begun engaging with the community through sustainable paddock to plate farming including free range eggs, spring lamb, and corn. The company was known as Majura Valley Free Range Eggs has become a recognised and respected brand within the Capital and surrounds and an important preserver of farming within the region.

=== The Mount Majura Solar Farm ===
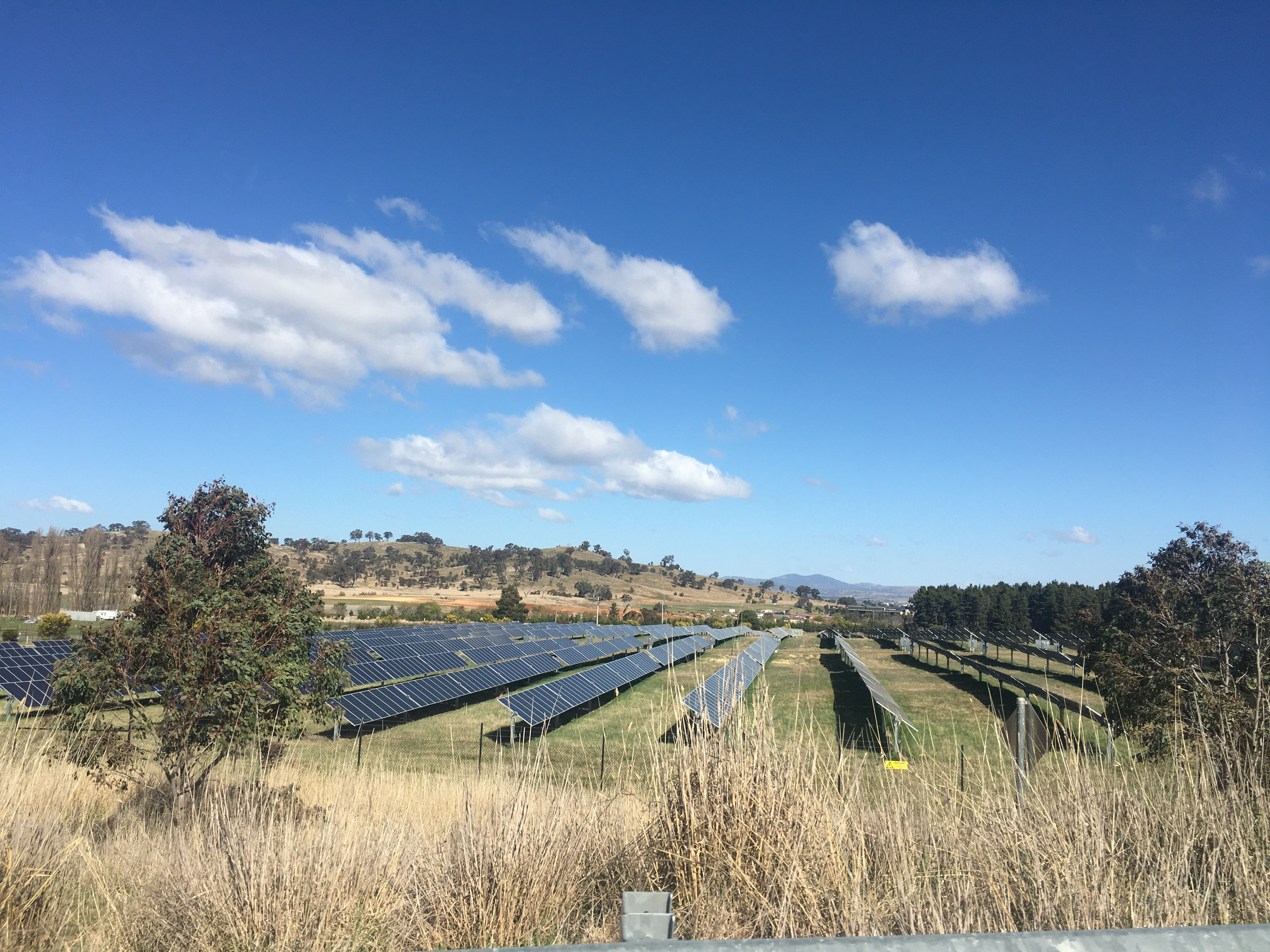
Mount Majura solar farm

The Mount Majura Solar Farm is built on part of the Majura Vineyard that was cut off by the Majura Parkway project. It is the largest community-owned solar farm in Australia. It has a rated output of 2.3 megawatts and was opened on 6 October 2016.

== History ==
The Majura Valley was used by the Australian Aboriginal Ngunnawal people before settlement by Britons in the mid-1820s and 1830s. Settlements were scarce, and recent surveys show that this was likely a transitory camping area during nomadic journeys between Lake George and the upper Yass River catchments.

A Scotsman, Robert Campbell settled the area, having been granted land in 1825. His compensation grant was 4,000 acres (16 km2) of land and 710 sheep, after Campbell's ship the "Sydney" was lost off the coast of New Guinea while chartered to the New South Wales government. Campbell named his property Majura probably after "Majura in India", according to the ACT National Trust. A cadastral map of 1 June 1904 shows the name of Campbell's property as "Madura", the British spelling of Madurai. In 1825 James Ainslie by assignment of Campbell started a sheep station in the area which today is Canberra. Campbell named the property Duntroon. The origin of this name was Duntrune Castle at Argyll and Bute in Scotland. The house was later acquired for the establishment of the Royal Military College and eventually became its mess.

Campbell was assigned convict labourers, but also sought to bring free settlers as farm workers. These people were settled on small holdings of around 2 acres. Such a holding appears to be "Majura House" which is reputed to have been built for Alfred Mayo and his family between 1846 and 1860, the house remaining in family ownership until 1981. By the mid-1850s there were approximately 50 people residing in the Majura Valley (see links).

Following land reforms in 1861, other families sought free selection of Crown Land in the Majura Valley in the 1860s and by the late 1800s had established what was a proto-village with school, community hall and Post Office, near the "Avonley" property. By 1891 there were 83 dwellings, housing 393 people within the Majura Valley. A major land holder was the Harman family.

Creation of the Federal Capital Territory in 1912 ended freehold title, with the land becoming Commonwealth lands that were then leased to former occupiers.

The Majura District was designated by the Districts Act of 1966 as one of the 18 districts of the Australian Capital Territory (ACT).

== Suburbs and localities ==
- Pialligo
