= Transport in the Australian Capital Territory =

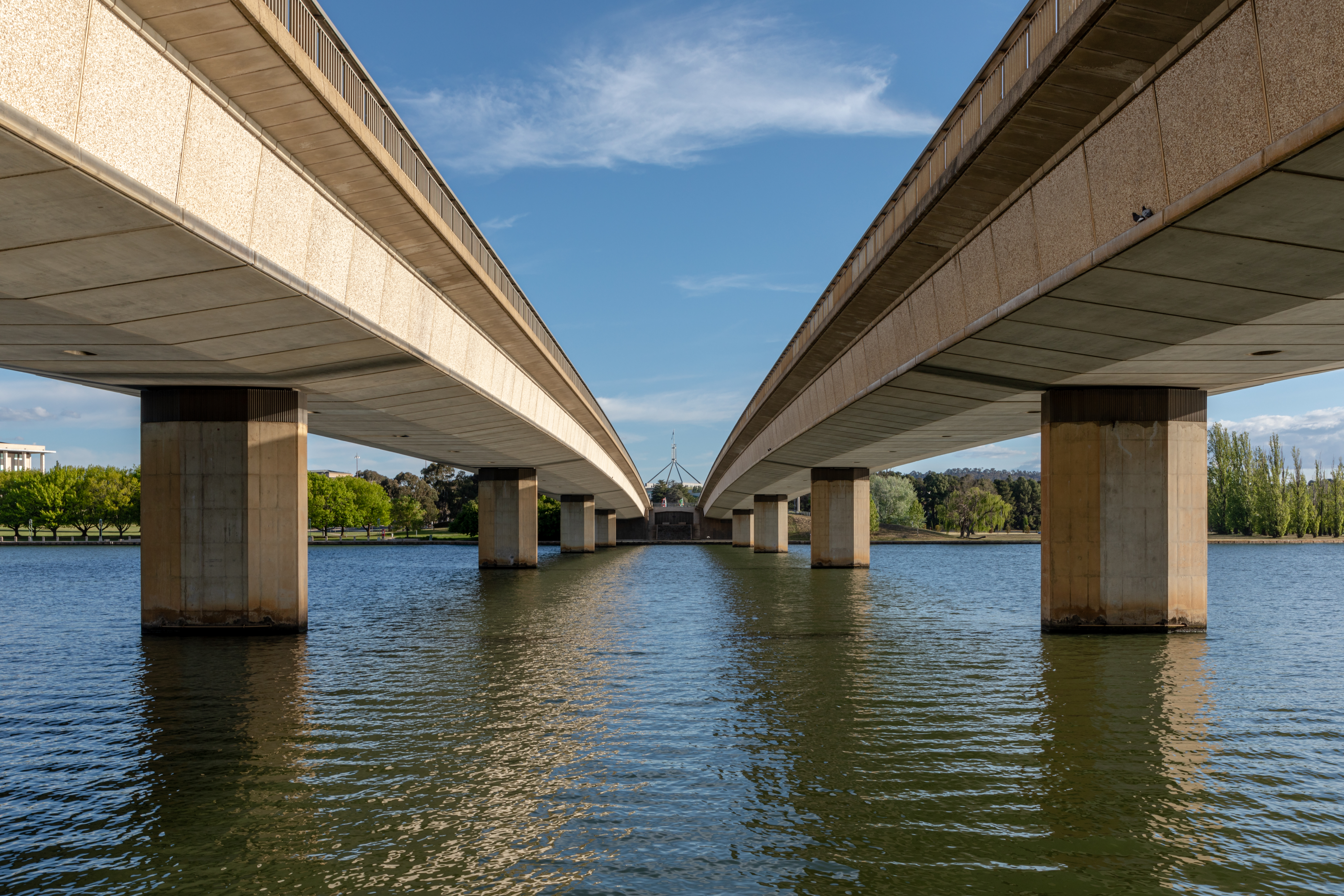
The Commonwealth Avenue Bridge in Canberra

The Australian Capital Territory (ACT) in Australia has a transport network that connects the landlocked territory with its suburbs and with New South Wales. The territory has an extensive road network, including major roads such as the Federal Highway, the Monaro Highway and the Majura Parkway, maintained by Roads ACT. The ACT's only passenger rail service connects Canberra to Sydney via the Bombala railway line.

== Roads ==
The ACT has many roads connecting it with its towns, including Canberra, Gungahlin and Monash, as well as the cities outside the territory like Queanbeyan, Goulburn and Cooma. The main agency responsible for the maintenance of these roads is Roads ACT.

Major roads in the ACT include the Federal Highway, Monaro Highway and Majura Parkway.

There are approximately 1,000 bridges in the ACT.

== Rail ==
=== Heavy ===
The ACT's only passenger rail service is the Canberra Xplorer service on the Bombala railway line, served by New South Wales Xplorers from Sydney Central to Canberra station.

The remainder of the Bombala railway line after Canberra is now abandoned and there have been multiple attempts to re-open the line.

=== Light ===
The main city of Canberra has a 12 kilometres (7.5 mi) light rail network that connects it to the neighbouring town of Gungahlin, which opened in 2019. The light rail line is serviced by the Canberra Metro Operations (CMET), and are serviced by CAF Urbos 3 trams.

== See also ==
- Transport in Canberra
