= Fairbairn Avenue =

Road in Canberra, Australia

Fairbairn Avenue Australian Capital Territory

General information
- Type: Road
- Length: 4.2 km (2.6 mi)
- Former route number: Alternative National Route 23 (1991–2016) (through Pialligo); ACT Tourist Route 3

Major junctions
- East end: Pialligo Avenue; Pialligo, Australian Capital Territory
- Majura Road; Majura Parkway
- West end: Limestone Avenue; Anzac Parade; Campbell, Australian Capital Territory

Location(s)
- Major suburbs: Duntroon, Russell, Campbell, Pialligo

Fairbairn Avenue is a major arterial road in the eastern suburbs of Canberra, the capital city of Australia. The road travels from a junction with Pialligo Avenue near Canberra Airport to the Australian War Memorial, a distance of 4.2 km (2.6 mi). It is the primary access route to the Australian Defence Force Academy, Campbell Park and Mount Ainslie. Fairbairn Avenue carries the Alternative National Highway 23 designation for a short distance between Majura Road and Morshead Drive. This eastern section suffers from heavy traffic congestion during morning and afternoon peak periods and a number of recent upgrades aim to address this. In 2009, works to improve access and traffic flows around the airport precinct saw Fairbairn Avenue duplicated between Pialligo Avenue – where an existing roundabout was replaced with traffic lights – and Morshead Drive, also improving the intersection with Majura Road. A grade separated interchange constructed over Fairbairn Avenue as part of the Majura Parkway project was completed in 2016.

The name Fairbairn Avenue was officially gazetted on 8 February 1968, in honour of Federal Minister for Civil Aviation James Fairbairn, who was killed on 13 August 1940 Canberra air disaster.
