= Horse Park Drive =

Road in Canberra, Australia

Horse Park Drive Australian Capital Territory
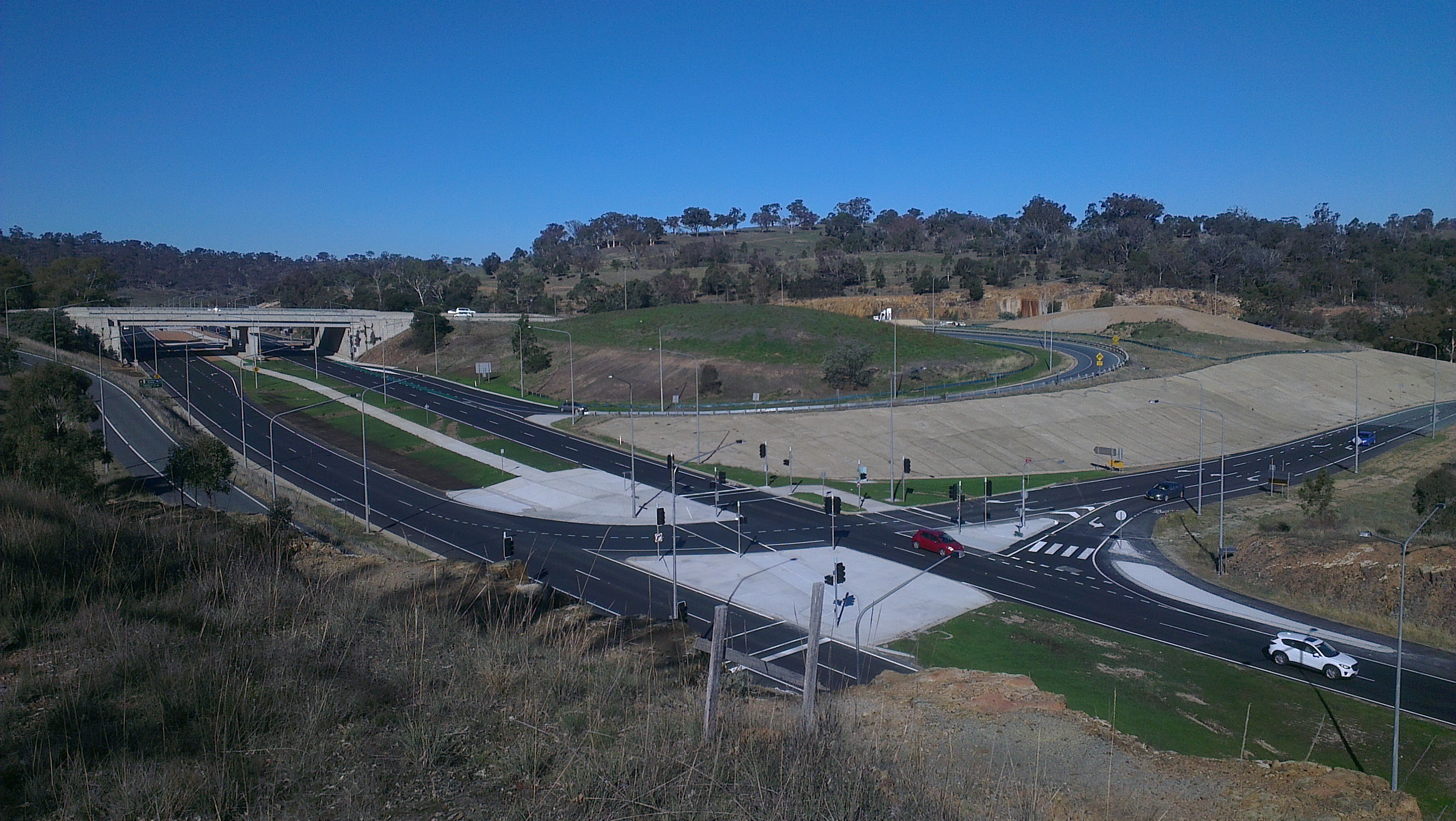
- Interchange between Federal Highway, Horse Park Drive and Majura Parkway

General information
- Type: Road
- Length: 13.7 km (8.5 mi)

Major junctions
- West end: Gungahlin Drive; Clarrie Hermes Drive; Ngunnawal, Australian Capital Territory
- Mulligans Flat Road; Gundaroo Drive; Well Station Drive; Federal Highway
- East end: Majura Parkway; Majura, Australian Capital Territory

Horse Park Drive is an arterial road in the Gungahlin district of Canberra, Australia. It is named for the homestead Horse Park, built in 1853 which is located in the suburb of Jacka. The road provides a bypass of the Gungahlin town centre, linking the western suburbs of the district to the Federal Highway to Goulburn and the Majura Parkway, linking to the Monaro Highway and Canberra Airport.

Originally built as a single carriageway, population growth in Gungahlin led to significant traffic congestion during peak times leading to calls for the road to be duplicated. Duplication of an 8 km (5.0 mi) section of Horse Park Drive began in 2018 and was completed in stages, initially between Well Station Drive and Anthony Rolfe Avenue, then to the Federal Highway. An additional section extending north to the intersection of Katherine Avenue and Roden Cutler Drive was also included in the project during construction. These works were completed in May 2019 and included a new bridge over Sullivan's Creek, construction of a parallel shared path between the Federal Highway and Well Station Drive and landscaping with 400 new trees planted along the route.
