= Black Mountain (Australian Capital Territory) =

Small mountain in Australian Capital Territory

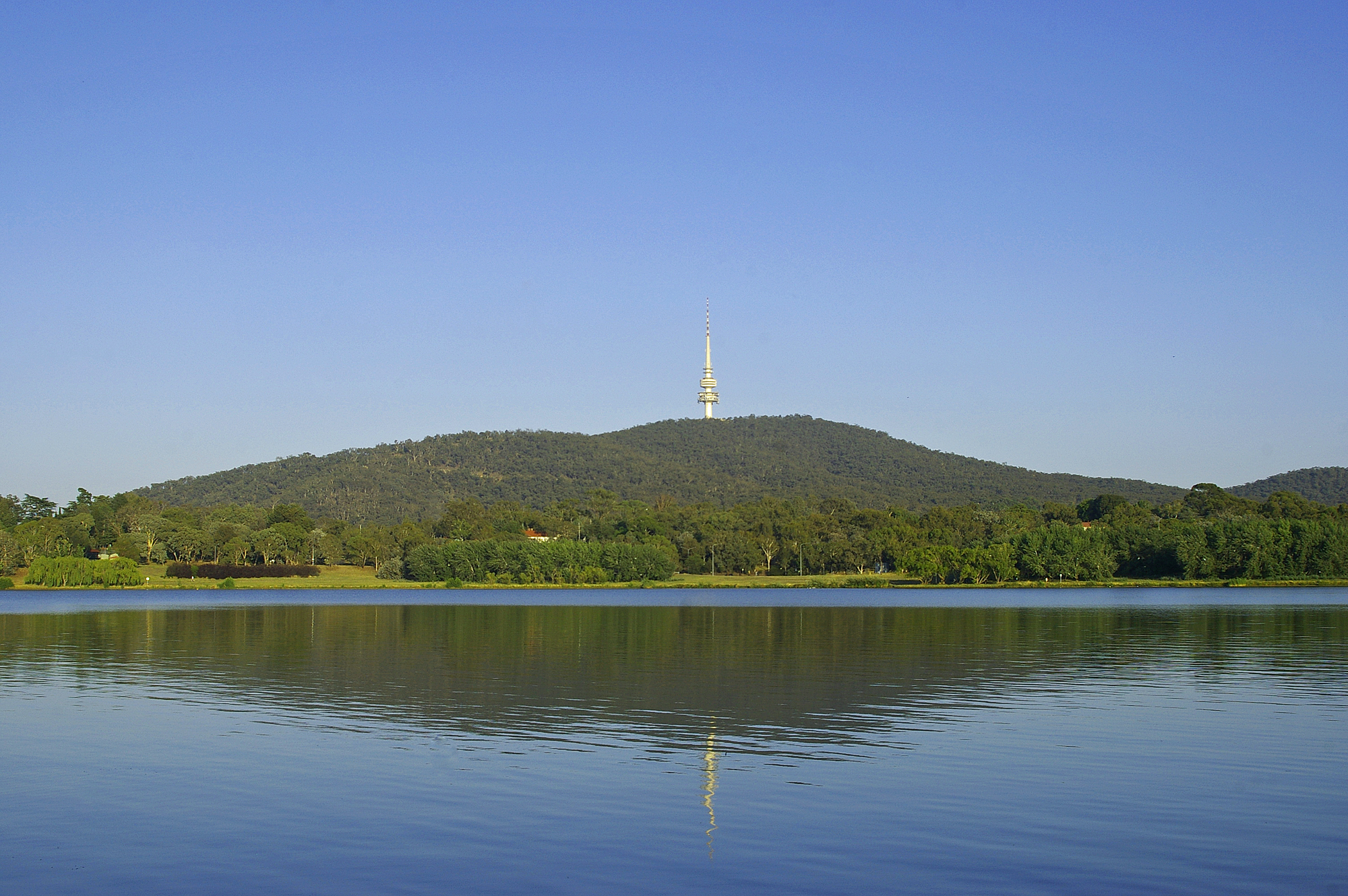
- Black Mountain and Telstra Tower as seen from across Lake Burley Griffin.

Highest point
- Elevation: 812 m (2,664 ft)
- Prominence: 256 m (840 ft)
- Coordinates: 35°16′S 149°06′E

Geography
- Location within Australian Capital Territory
- Location: Australian Capital Territory, Australia

Geology
- Rock age: Silurian

Climbing
- First ascent: 1820
- Easiest route: Hike or drive

Black Mountain is a small mountain with an elevation of 812 metres (2,664 ft) AHD that is situated to the west of the Canberra central business district on the northern shore of Lake Burley Griffin, in the Australian Capital Territory of Australia. Black Mountain is protected from development by its Canberra Nature Park status and is predominantly covered in native bushland serving as a haven to native wildlife.

== Aboriginal significance ==
Galambary (Black Mountain) is a sacred Aboriginal meeting and business site, predominantly for men’s business. Black Mountain and adjacent Mount Ainslie are referred to as women’s breasts. Galambary was also used by Ngunnawal people as an initiation site, with the mountain itself said to represent the growth of a boy into a man.

== Location and features ==
The mountain is located west of the main campus of the Australian National University and, together with the Bruce ridge, forms a natural west and northwestern boundary for Canberra city. Black Mountain rises 256 metres (840 ft) above the water level of Lake Burley Griffin that lies at its base. Situated close to the highest point on the mountain is Telstra Tower (also known as Black Mountain Tower, and formerly Telecom Tower), a broadcasting tower rising a further 195 metres (640 ft) above the summit.

The Australian National Botanic Gardens and the CSIRO share the eastern base of Black Mountain, next to the Australian National University.

Black Mountain was originally named Black Hill at the same time as the naming of nearby Red Hill. The original name explains why the mountain is not named Mount Black, like nearby Mount Majura and Mount Ainslie. The early European settlers referred to the mountain formation as the Canberry Ranges.

== Geology ==
The bulk of Black Mountain consists of the white quartz Black Mountain Sandstone. This was deposited in the late Early Silurian age. On the south-east slopes and north-west west there are exposures of State Circle shale. The Black Mountain Peninsula contains mudstone in the north and greywacke from the Ordovician age Pittman Formation in the south.
