= Fulton Hogan =

New Zealand construction supplying company

- Type: Unlisted public
- Industry: Civil engineering, construction
- Founded: Dunedin, New Zealand (1933)
- Founder: Julius Fulton; Robert Hogan
- Headquarters: Christchurch, New Zealand; Parkville, Victoria, Australia
- Area served: New Zealand; Australia; Pacific Islands
- Key people: Graeme Johnson, Group CEO
- Products: Asphalt; Precast Concrete
- Services: Road and pavement construction Building construction Water infrastructure Transport infrastructure Project Management
- Revenue: $6.80 billion (2025)
- Operating income: $502.9 million (2025)
- Number of employees: 6,500+ in New Zealand; 4,000+ in Australia
- Website: www.fultonhogan.com

Fulton Hogan is a large infrastructure construction, roadworks and aggregate supplier company in New Zealand, which is also active in wider Australasia.

The company was founded by Julius Fulton and Robert Hogan in Dunedin in 1933. In 2013 the company reported an annual operating profit of NZ$96.5 million, from revenue of $3.22 billion, and employed over 5,500 people. This is up from 3,400 staff and a net profit of over $55 million on revenue of $891 million in 2005.

== History ==
After the motor vehicle gained increasing prominence in the 1920s, political and popular pressure grew to create a system of New Zealand state highways. The newly formed Fulton Hogan would be one of the companies growing from and building this system in the following decades, at first mainly in the South Island.

It was created by Julius Fulton, an assistant surveyor, and Robert Hogan, a mechanic, who had both been employees of the Neuchatel Asphalte Company in East Taieri in the late 1920s. After losing their jobs, they formed their own company during the Depression; with Hogan organising machinery, often bought or loaned from the Public Works Department, and Fulton overseeing the works.

While World War II slowed their expansion, the years after the war found large growth in roadworks and also in the building of the Comalco Aluminium Smelter and Roxburgh Hydro plant. These days, the company's operations stretch through all of New Zealand and much of Australasia, covering such tasks as residential driveways to dams and airport runways.

== In popular culture ==
Fulton Hogan's logo was seen in all 5 series of the BBC Comedy Keeping Up Appearances. The character "Onslow" is always seen wearing a cap with the "FH" logo on. According to Geoffrey Hughes, the actor who played Onslow, he was given the cap by a Fulton Hogan truck driver while on a promotional trip in New Zealand for a previous project.
