= Majura Park Shopping Centre =

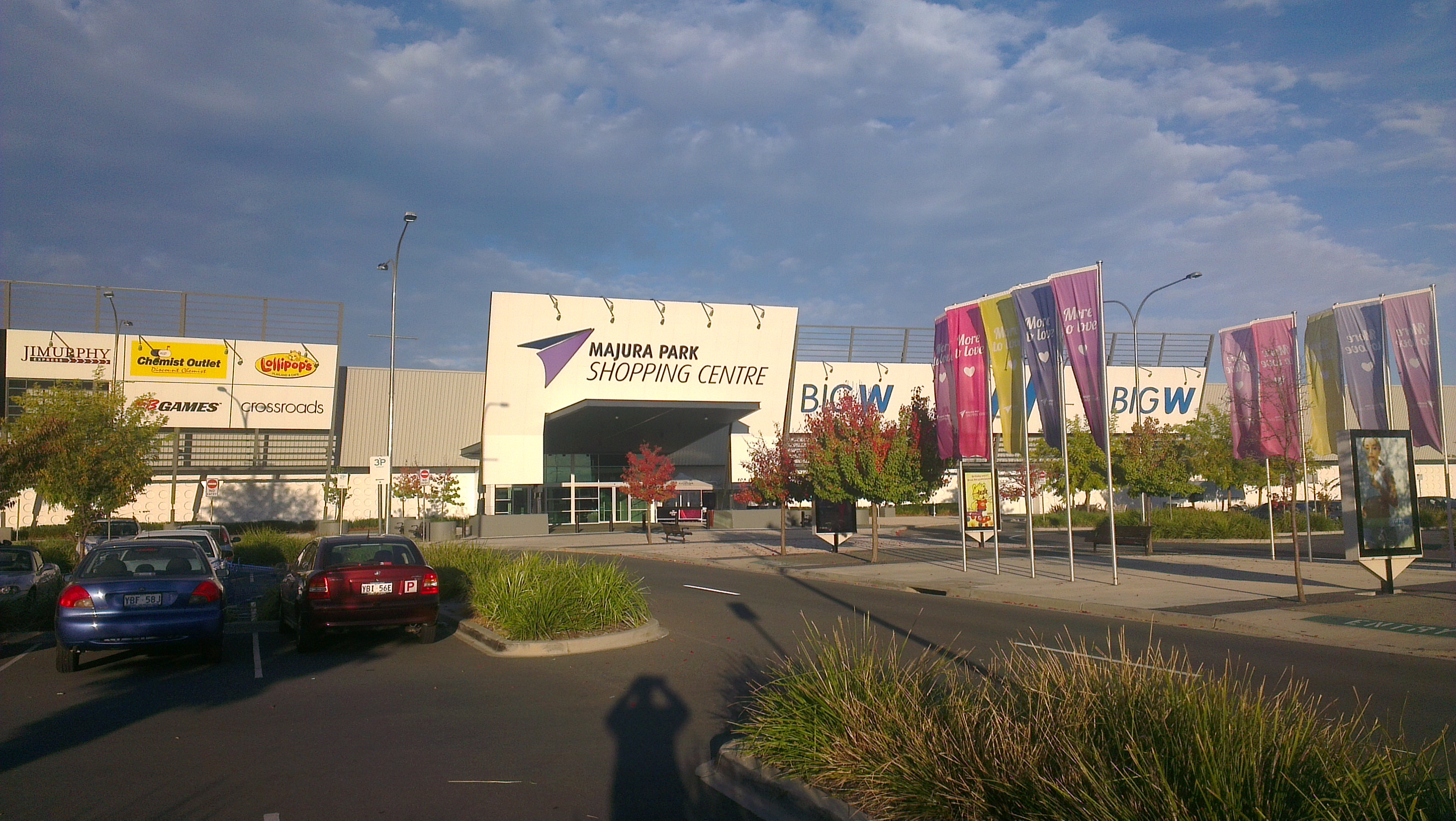
- Location: District of Majura, Canberra, Australia
- Coordinates: 35.29917°S 149.19090°E
- Opened: 2006
- Owner: Canberra Airport
- Num. of stores: 138
- Num. of anchor tenants: 3
- Floor area: approx 20,000 m^{2} (220,000 sq ft)
- Floors: 1
- Parking: 2000+
- Website: www.majuraparkshopping.com.au

The Majura Park Shopping Centre, formerly Brand Depot, is a big-box type shopping centre in the district of Majura in Canberra, Australia. It was developed by Canberra Airport as part of the Majura Park precinct. The shopping centre, which opened in 2006, is part of a larger office and retail precinct on the airport's western boundary, adjacent to Majura Road. At the time of opening, the centre boasted Australia's largest Woolworths supermarket. The centre is also anchored by discount department store Big W and Toymate. In addition to the anchor tenants, there are over 30 specialty stores representing a variety of national chains, a 256-seat food court and Lollipop's Playland and Cafe - an air-conditioned, fully supervised children's playground.

Outside of the centre, within the Majura Park precinct can be found Canberra's only (and Australia's third) Costco wholesale outlet, Jim Murphy cellars (the store closed in March 2017 and shifted to an express outlet within the centre), and a number of factory outlet stores. A medical and dental clinic opened in 2013, with on-site physiotherapy and pathology services.

== History ==
The shopping centre was originally constructed as Brand Depot, a factory outlet centre in 2006 at a cost of $12.5 million. Brand Depot was intended to be constructed in three stages, eventually housing up to 120 retail stores. Due to the building's proximity to Canberra Airport's main runway, the use of construction cranes was restricted. The challenge was overcome with a mobile roll former developed by BlueScope Lysaght. The company manufactured 82.7 m (271 ft) long interlocking steel roofing segments onsite which were slid directly into position from the semi trailer mounted roller, eliminating the need for an overhead crane. Faced with increasing competition from a new Direct Factory Outlet centre at Fyshwick which opened in 2008 (now the Canberra Outlet Centre). Legal challenges by the management of Brand Depot under the Trade Practices Act and concerns about zoning of the DFO site, echoing the 2004 Orange Grove affair failed to stop the development from proceeding. By February 2011, one-third of its 75 stores were vacant and the centre was struggling to attract new tenants. By March, Brand Depot closed following the loss of four more tenant stores.

In June 2011, Woolworths encouraged by the location and Costco's investment in a 13,500m² wholesale warehouse next door to the old Brand Depot, announced plans to renovate the building into a shopping centre which could accommodate large format stores representing several of the company's brands. Following the deal to redevelop the centre, Woolworths announced in August that it would further invest in the Majura Park precinct with the construction of a large Masters Home Improvement store to compete directly with Costco. The Masters store closed in late 2016 and was replaced by Bunnings.
