= Campbell, Australian Capital Territory =

Suburb of Canberra, Australia

Campbell
- Suburb
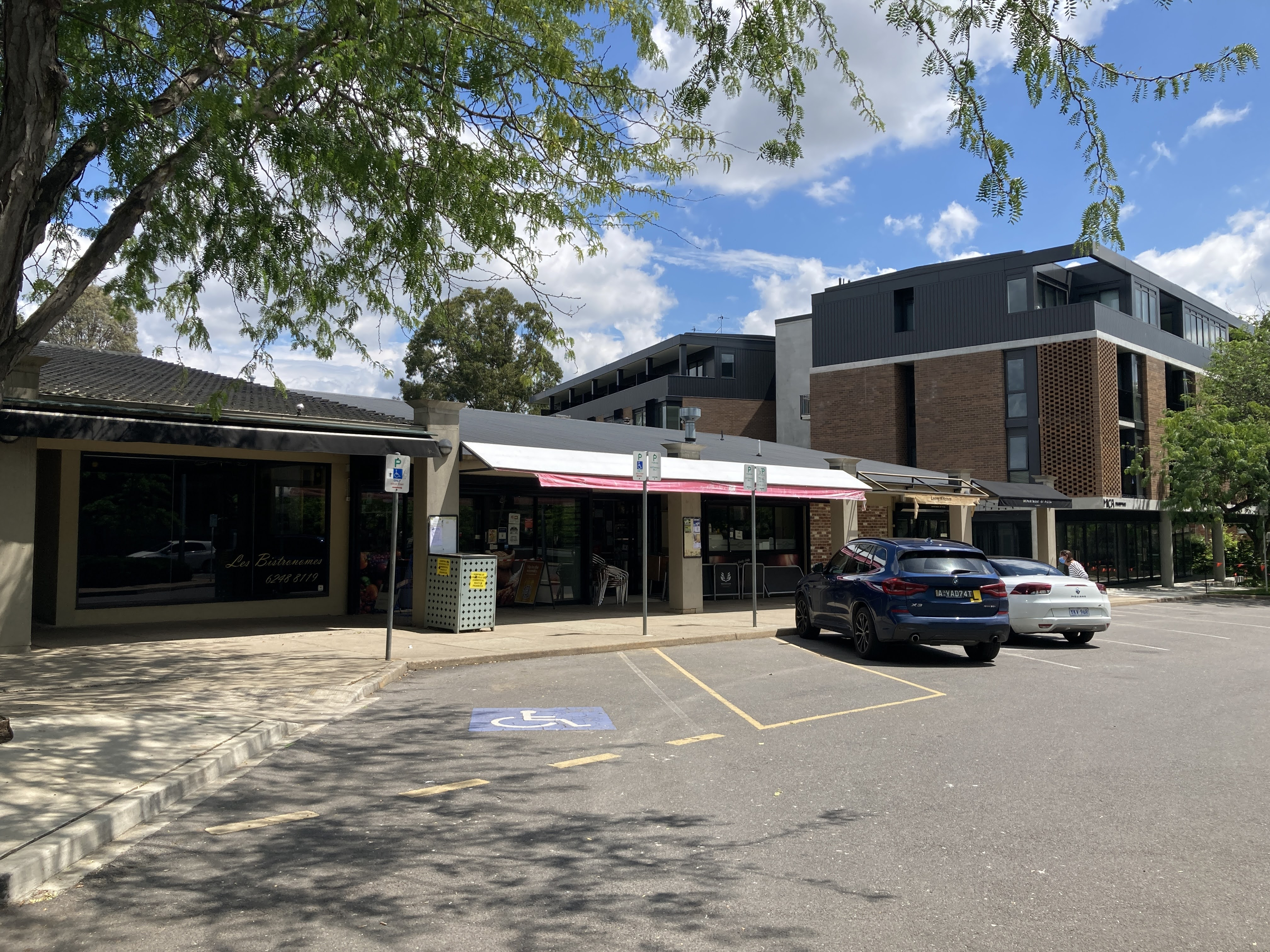
- Campbell shops in January 2022

- Coordinates: 35°17′17″S 149°09′14″E
- Country: Australia
- State: Australian Capital Territory
- City: Canberra
- District: North Canberra
- Location: 3 km (1.9 mi) ESE of Canberra CBD; 14 km (8.7 mi) NW of Queanbeyan; 92 km (57 mi) SW of Goulburn; 289 km (180 mi) SW of Sydney
- Established: 1928

Government
  - Territory electorate: Kurrajong
  - Federal division: Canberra

Area
  - Total: 6.4 km^{2} (2.5 sq mi)
- Elevation: 591 m (1,939 ft)

Population
  - Total: 6,564 (2021 census)
  - Density: 1,026/km^{2} (2,656/sq mi)
- Postcode: 2612
Suburbs around Campbell
Braddon	Ainslie	Mount Ainslie
Reid	Campbell	Mount Ainslie
Russell; Parkes	Fyshwick	Pialligo

Campbell is a suburb of Canberra, Australian Capital Territory, Australia. Covering an area to the South East of the central business district, Campbell sits at the base of Mount Ainslie and is bounded to the south east by the Mount Pleasant Nature Reserve. At the 2021 census, Campbell had a population of 6,564 people.

The suburb of Campbell is named after Robert Campbell, the owner of Duntroon station on which Campbell is now located. Many buildings built by Robert Campbell and his family are still standing around Canberra, including Blundell's Cottage, St John the Baptist Church, Reid, Duntroon House (now part of RMC Duntroon) and Yarralumla House (now Government House).

Located in Campbell are the Australian War Memorial, Royal Military College, Duntroon, the Australian Defence Force Academy, and the former corporate headquarters of the CSIRO, which is awaiting demolition and redevelopment. Also with addresses in the suburb are the 'Ainslie Village' accommodation centre for people with special needs and the Campbell Park Offices.

Schools located in the suburb include Campbell High School, Saint Thomas More's Primary School, Campbell Primary School and Canberra Grammar Northside Infant School.

Daley Park is a small park located on Ferdinand Street featuring mature native trees, open lawn areas, and a small playground. The park is named in honour of Geoff Daley, beloved member of the community and a lifelong resident of Campbell.

== Demographics ==
In the 2021 Census, there were 6,564 people in Campbell. 70.5% of people were born in Australia. The next most common country of birth was England at 3.9%. 77.7% of people only spoke English at home. The most common responses for religion were No Religion 48.9%, Catholic 17.8% and Anglican 8.3%.

== Geology ==
Most of Campbell is dominated by the lowest layer of the Ainslie Volcanics, a grey dacite and other erupted particles such as agglomerate and tuff. In the north is grey quartz andesite, a higher layer of the Ainslie Volcanics. In the north east is cream rhyolite from the highest layer of the Ainslie Volcanics. The Ainslie Volcanics were formed in the Silurian period. A layer of the Tertiary age pebbly gravels is around Anzac Parade, left over from when the Molonglo river was at a higher level.

== Gallery ==
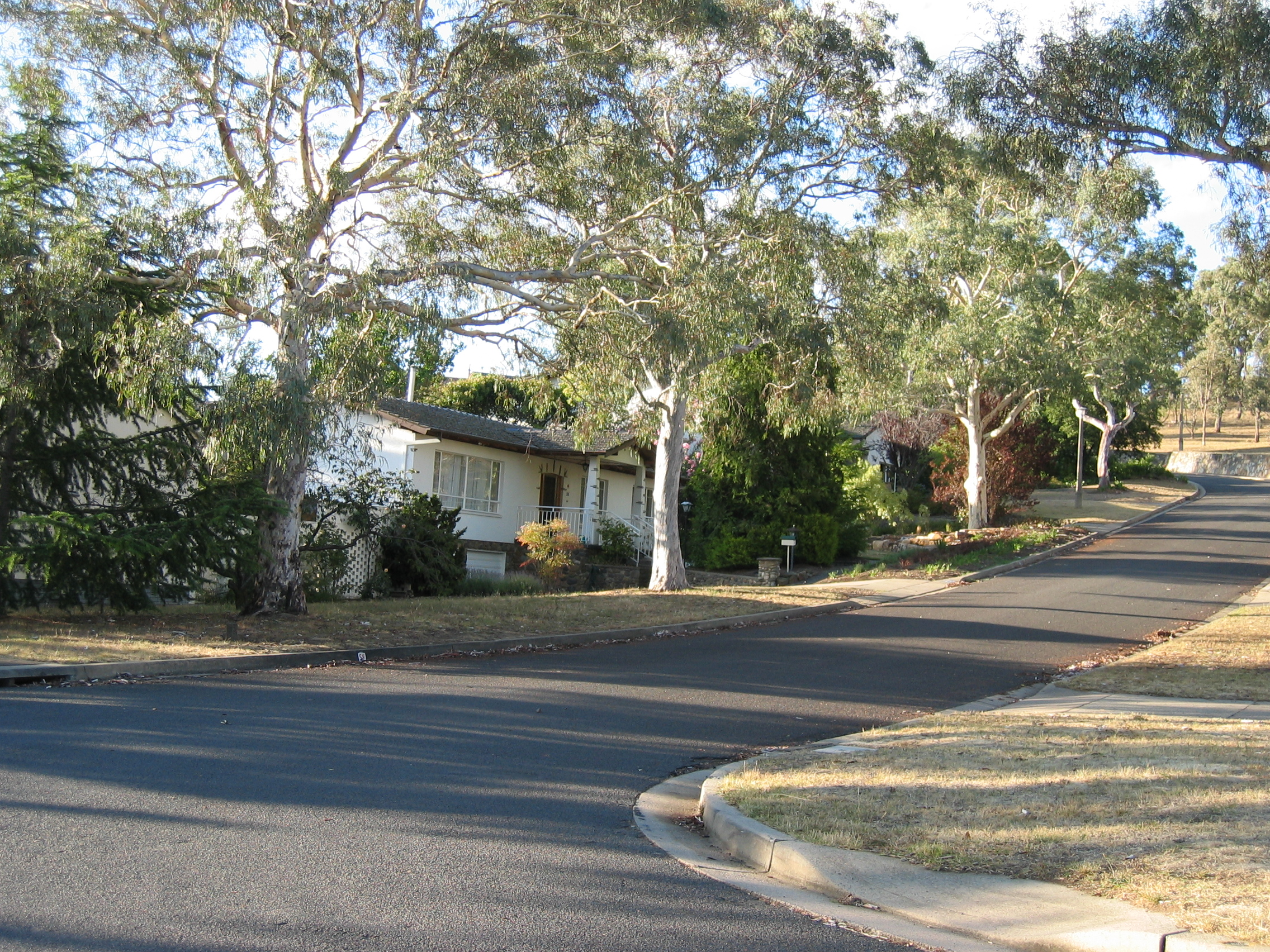
Patey Street, a residential street in Campbell

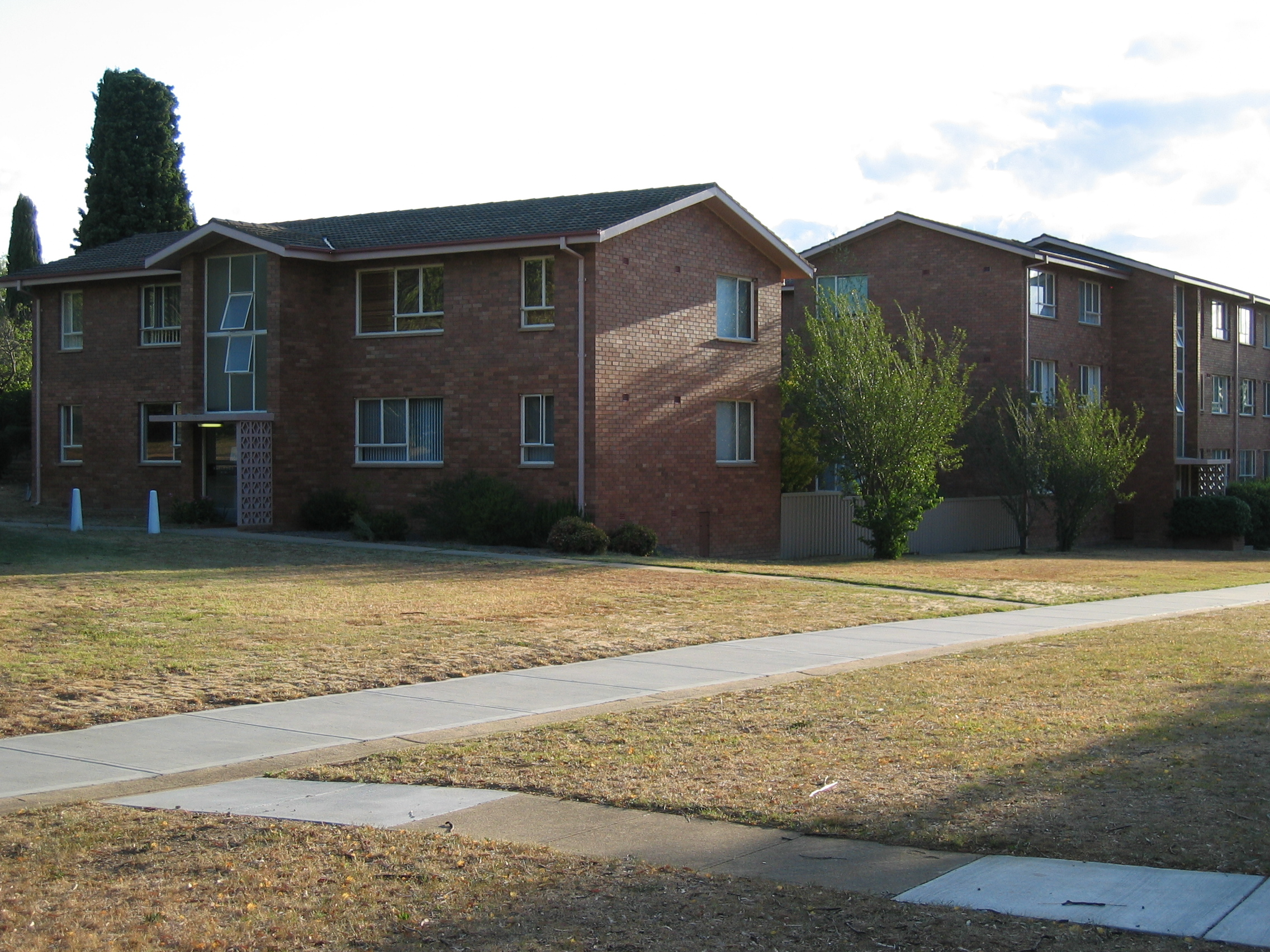
Medium density flats located at the centre of the suburb

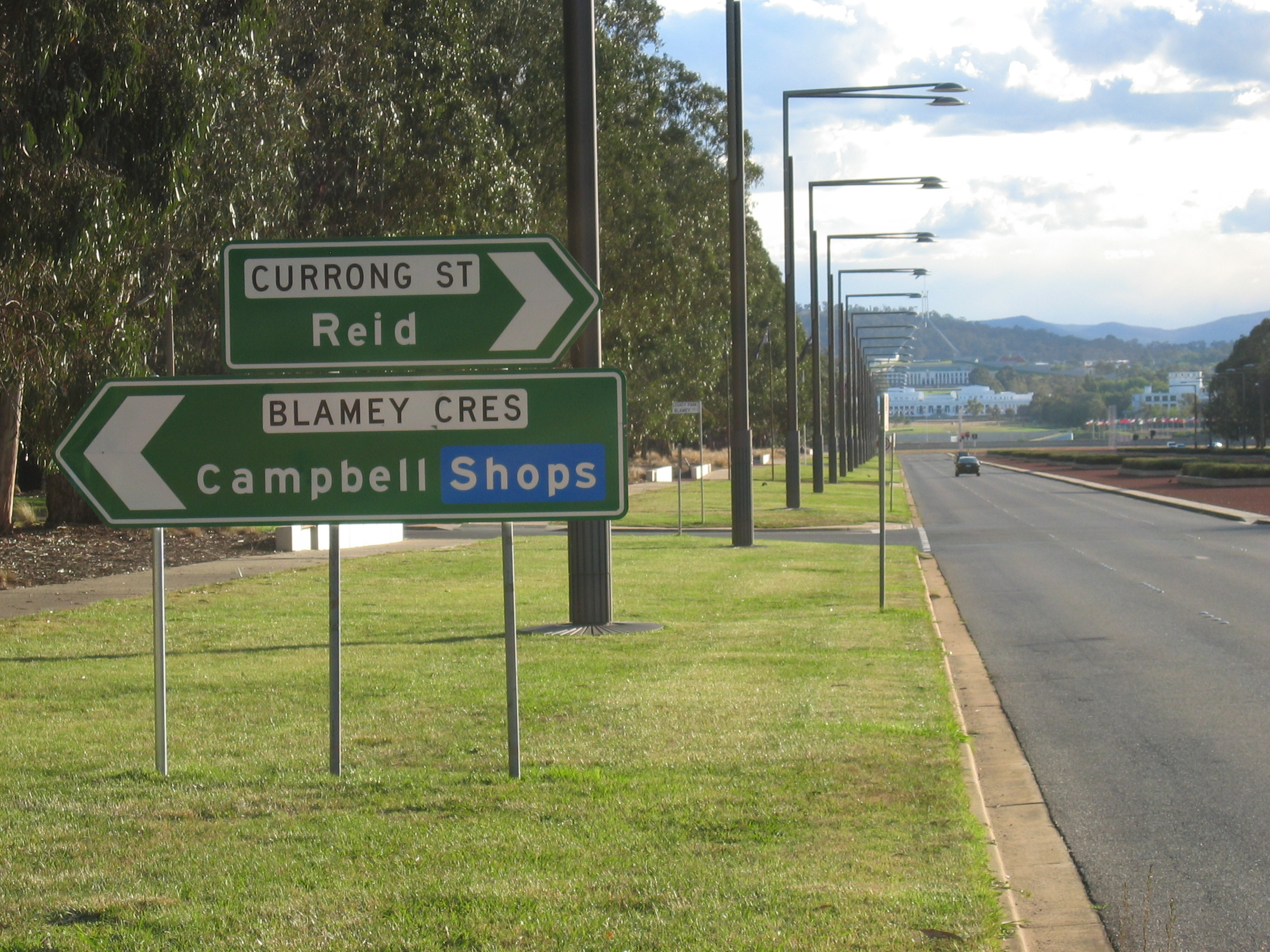
The suburb is bounded to the west by Anzac Parade

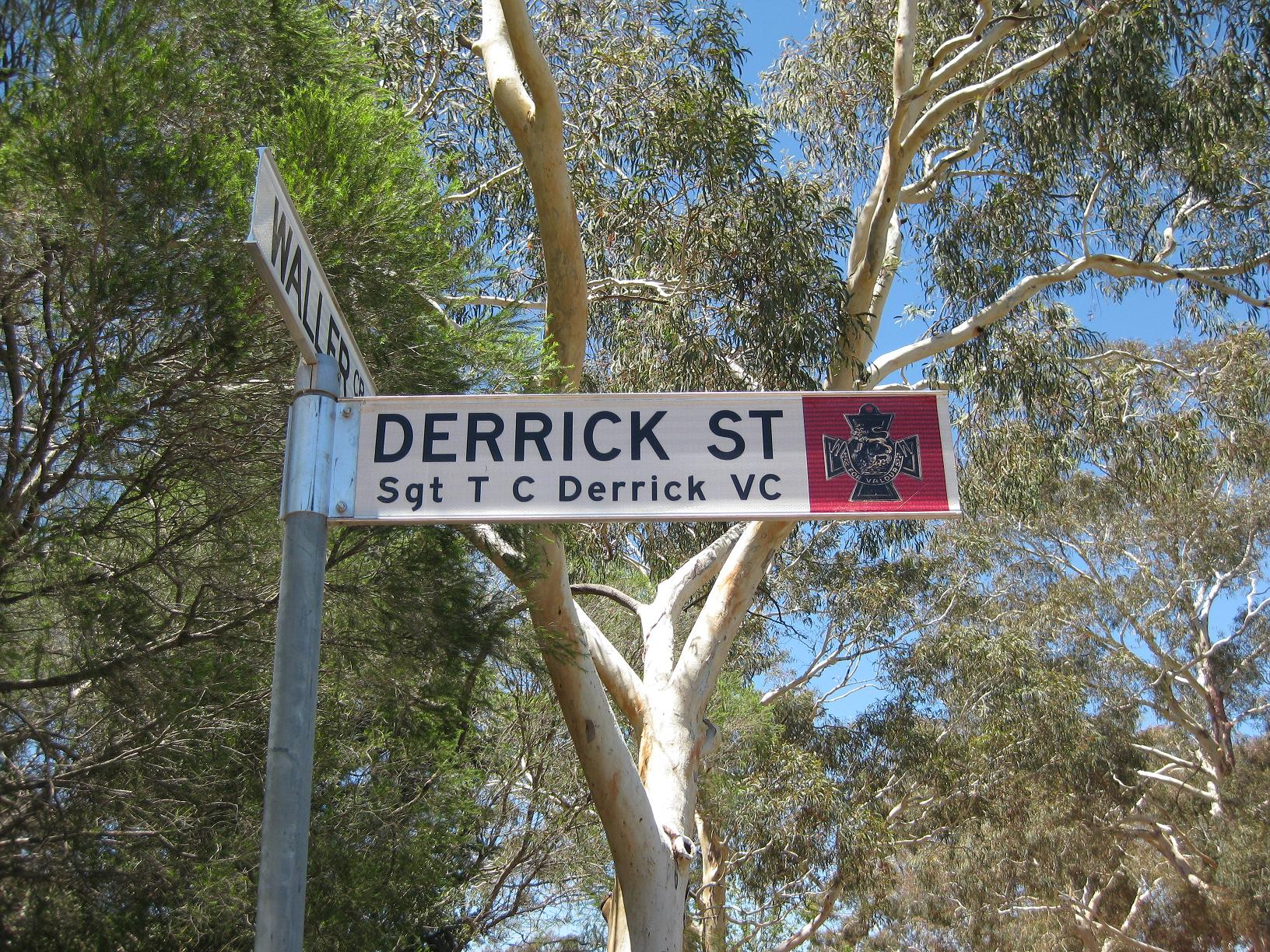
Most streets in Campbell are named after military personnel

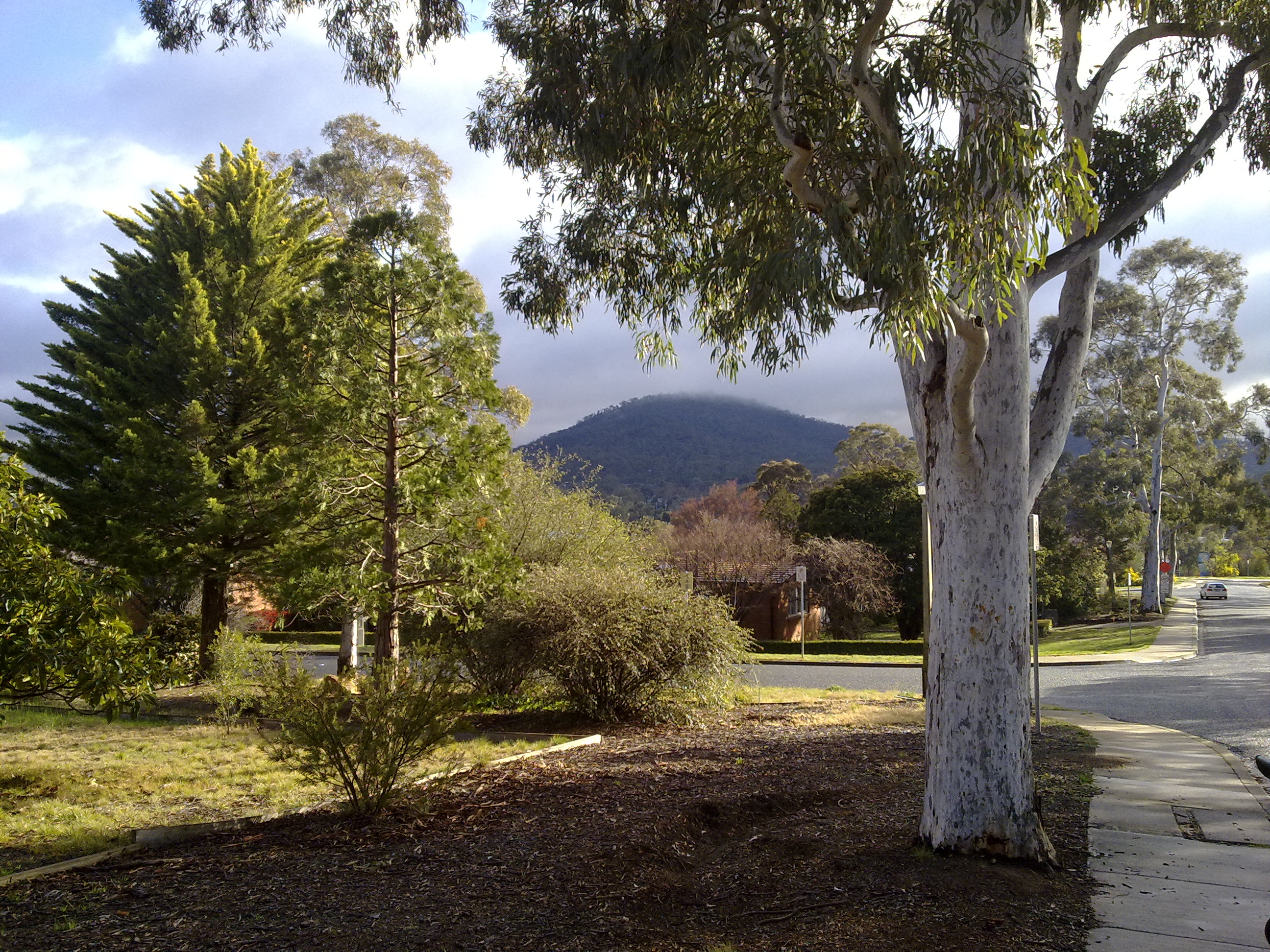
A view of Mount Ainslie from near the intersection of Elliot Street and Vasey Crescent, Campbell

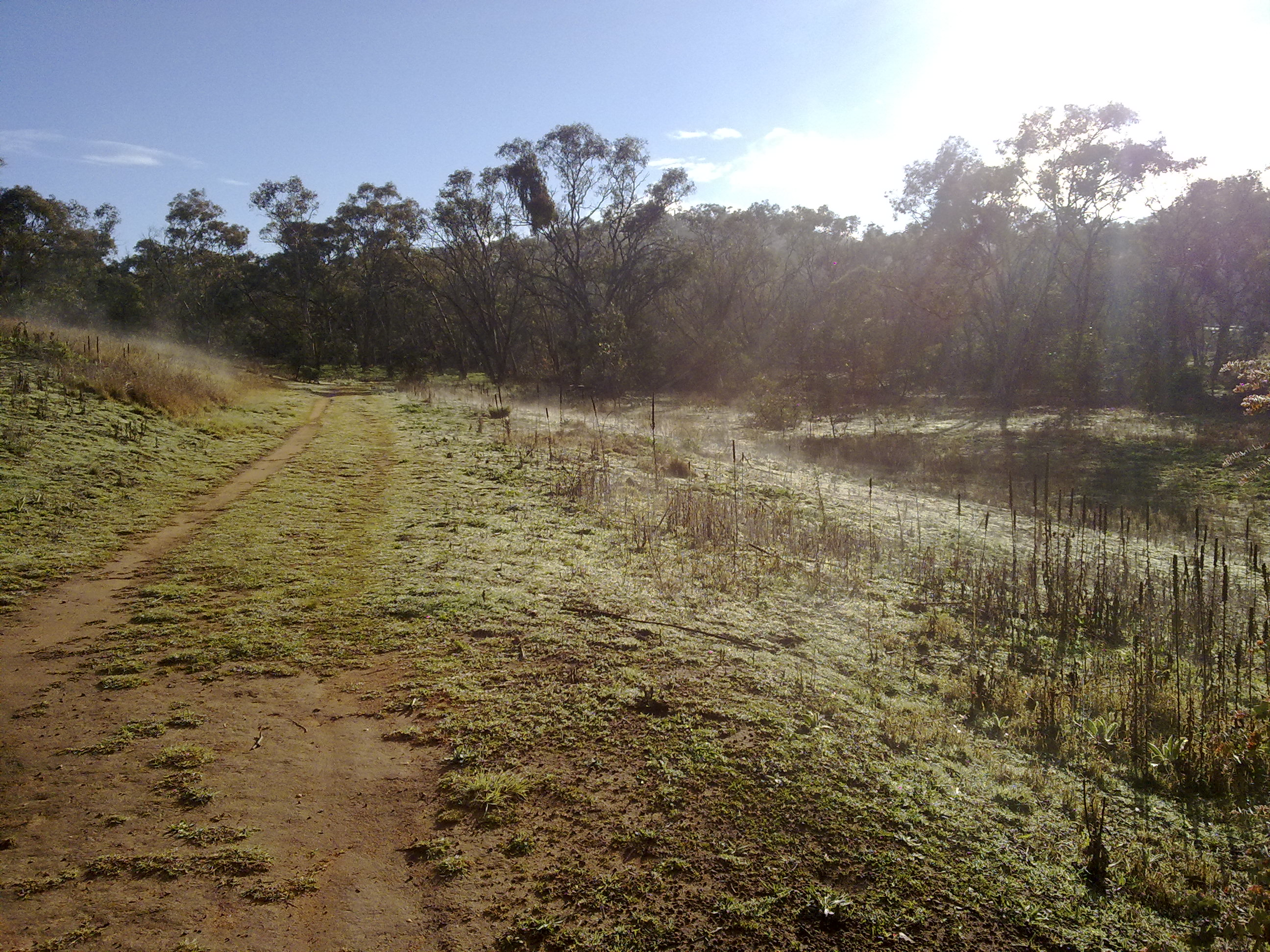
A disused track in patchy bushland in the reserve behind Vasey Crescent near Northcott Drive in Campbell

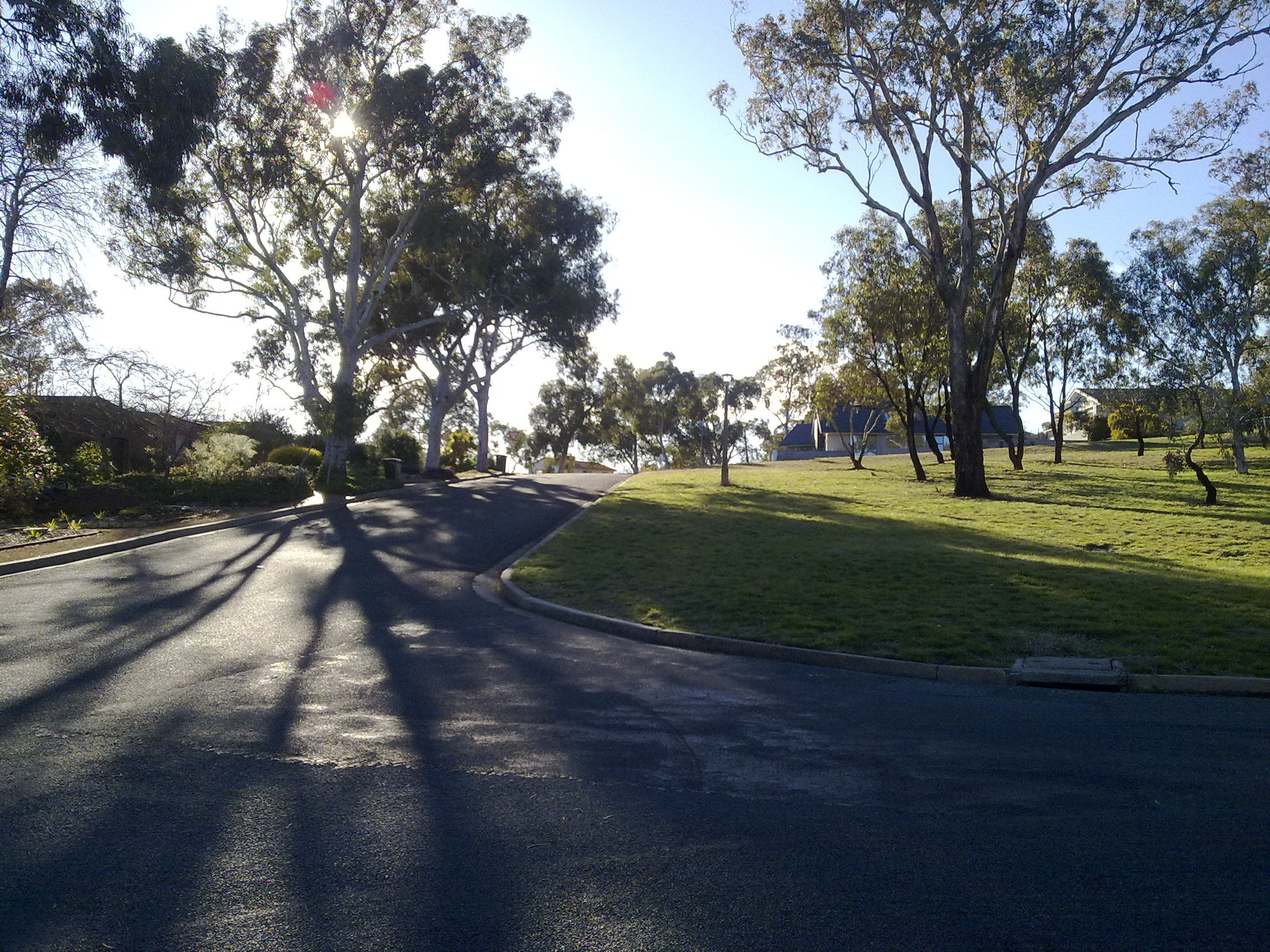
Looking up Patey Street from the Garsia Street intersection

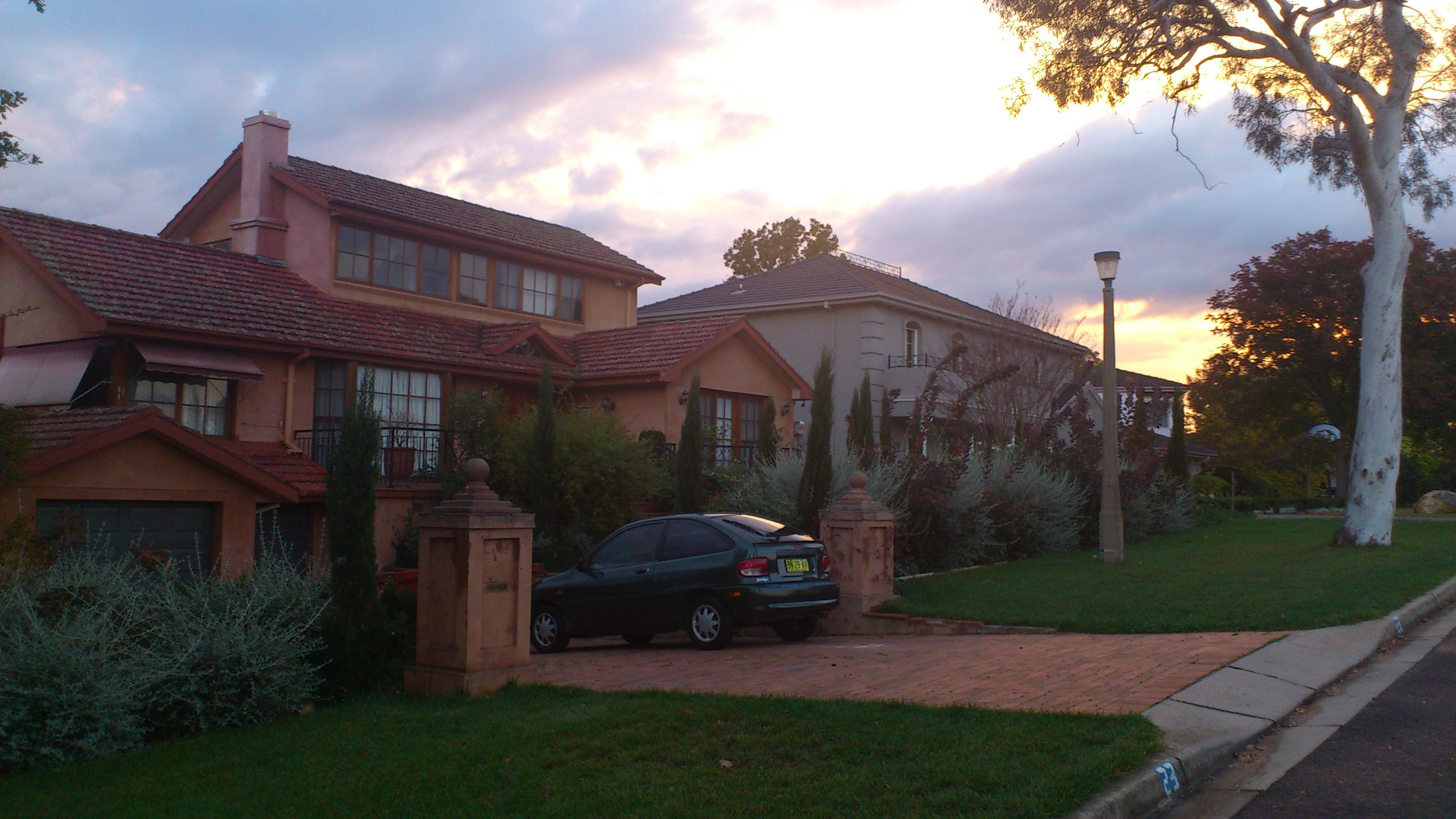
The crown of Savige Street in mid Campbell

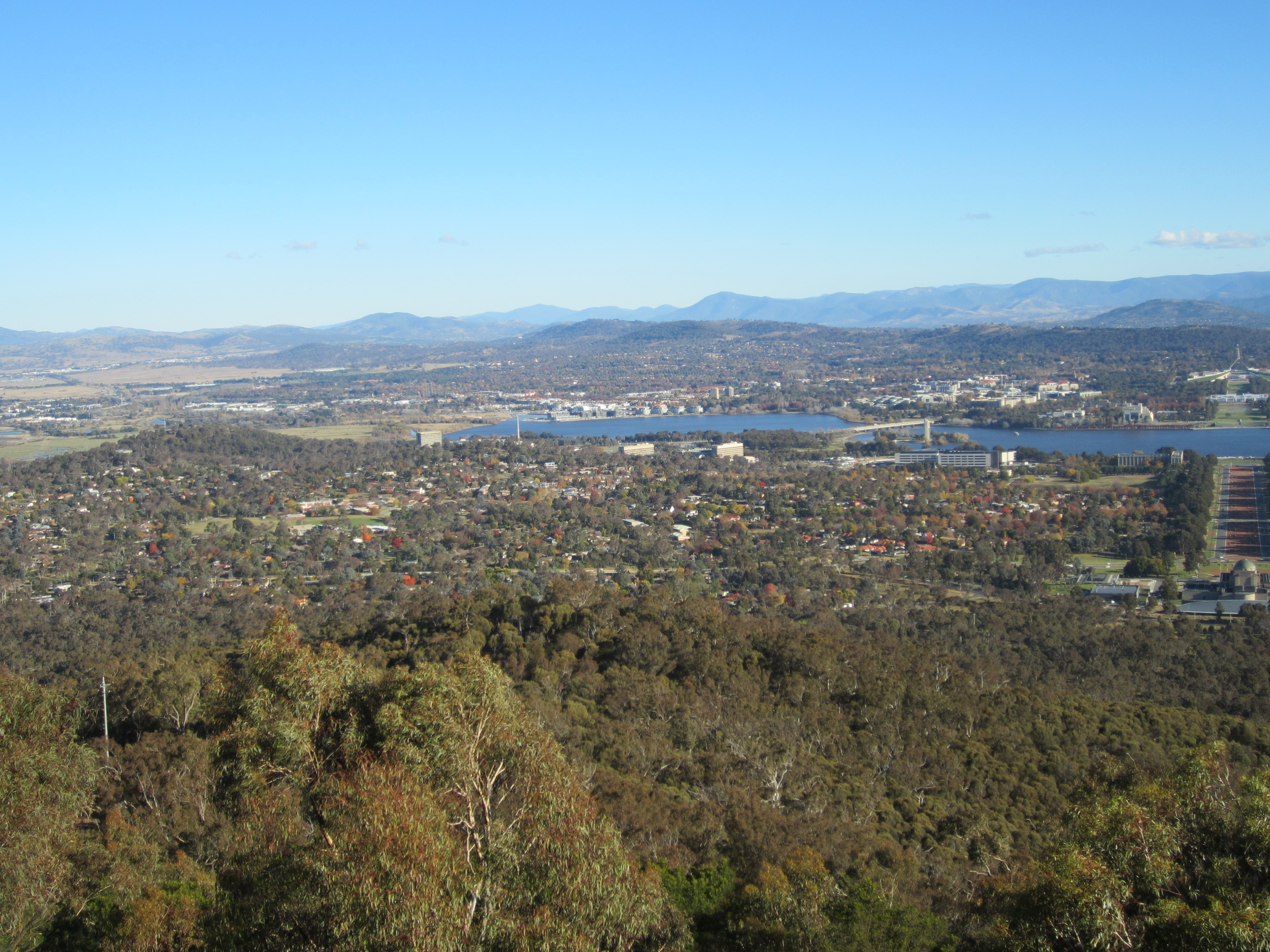
Campbell viewed from Mount Ainslie

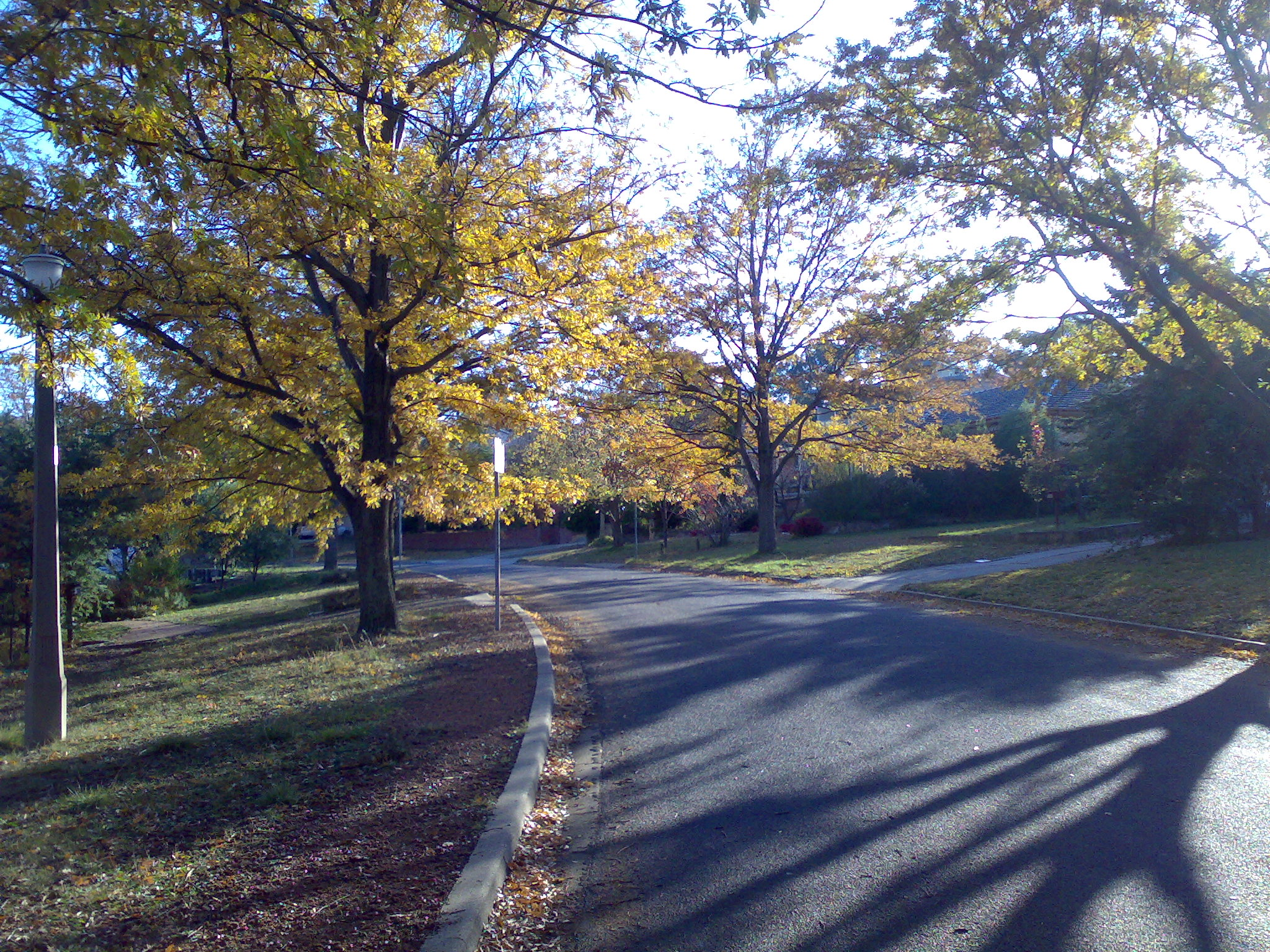
A view of Getting Crescent, Campbell, in mid-autumn
