= Mount Ainslie =

Hill in Canberra, Australia

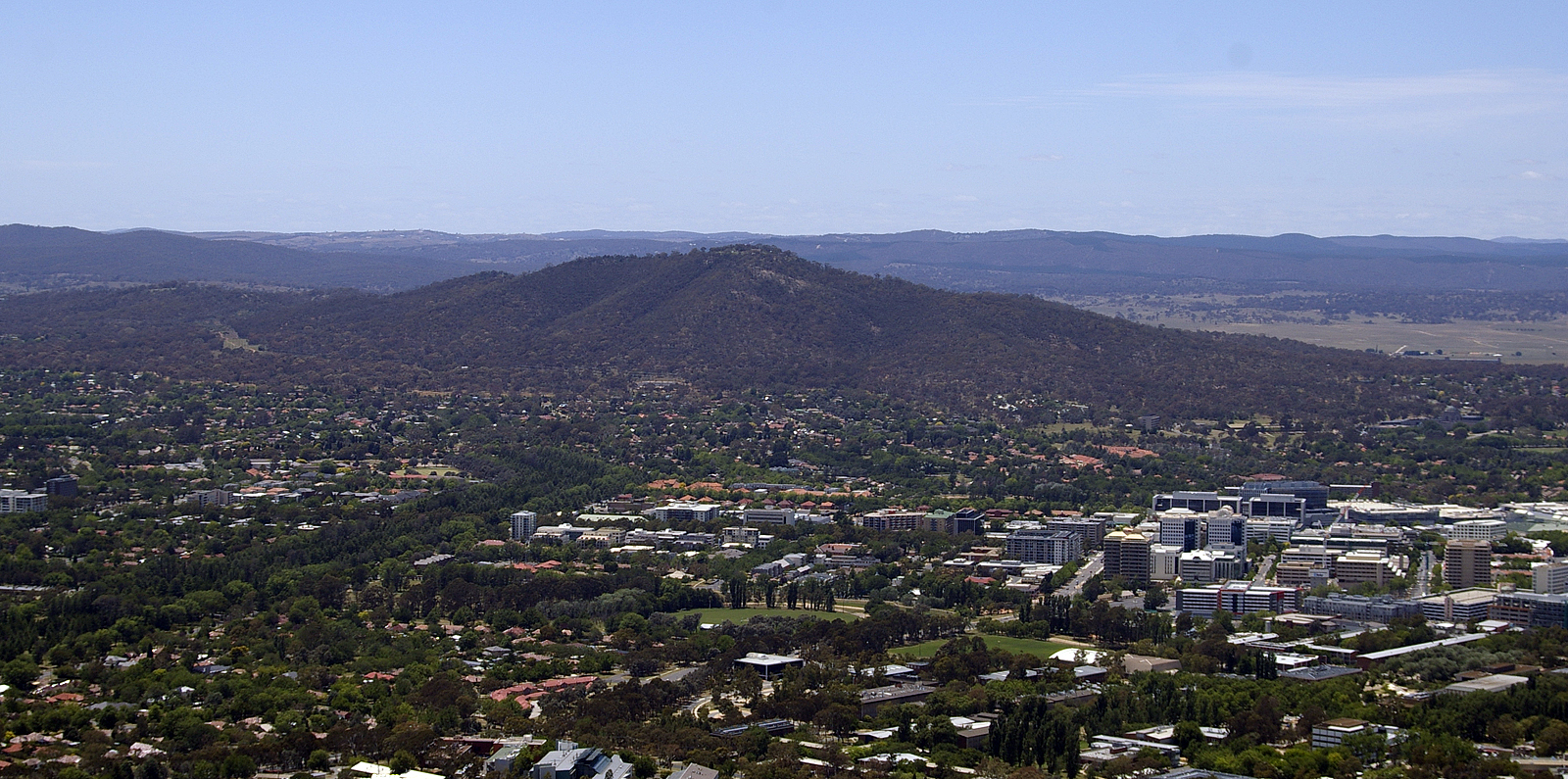
- Mount Ainslie viewed from the Telstra Tower

Highest point
- Elevation: 843 m (2,766 ft)
- Prominence: 163 m (535 ft)
- Coordinates: 35°16′12″S 149°09′30″E

Geography
- Location within Australian Capital Territory
- Location: Australian Capital Territory, Australia

Geology
- Rock age: Silurian

Climbing
- Easiest route: Drive

Mount Ainslie is a hill with an elevation of 843 metres (2,766 ft) AHD in the northeastern suburbs of Canberra, in the Australian Capital Territory, Australia. Mount Ainslie lies within part of the Canberra Nature Park.

== Cultural significance ==
According to the Ngunnawal and Ngambri people, Mount Ainslie is a sacred place primarily for women's business. Mount Ainslie and adjacent Galambary (Black Mountain) are referred to as women's breasts.

Current community usage includes opportunities for wildlife spotting along the network of walking and fire trails in the nature park, notably grey kangaroos and gang-gang cockatoos. There is a heritage "Heroes Path" linking the Australian War Memorial with the summit, marked by signs and plaques describing the difficult campaign along the Kokoda Track during WW2. Regular community sporting events include the "Mount Ainslie Run-Up" and Mount Ainslie parkrun, held every Saturday morning along the bush trails marking the western edge of the nature park.

== Location and features ==
Mount Ainslie borders on the inner suburbs of Campbell, Ainslie and Hackett and is named in honour of James Ainslie, a 19th-century settler who was the overseer on Duntroon, a large property in the area.

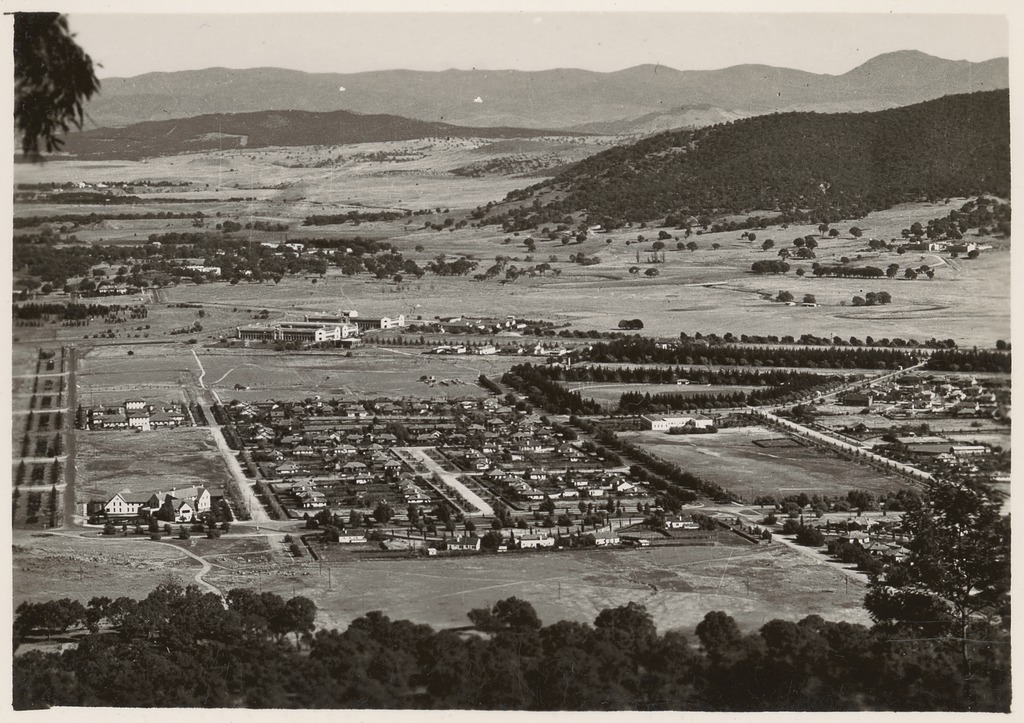
Photograph showing the view from Mount Ainslie, taken in the 1930s by an unknown photographer.

The Mount Ainslie tourist outlook, one of Canberra's most popular, provides excellent views of central Canberra and Red Hill to the south and Black Mountain to the west, especially towards sunset. According to an article written in 1922, this outlook "will afford an ever changing bird's eye and panoramic picture of the city's buildings and beauty spots, as well as of the lovely plains that run to join the Yass Plains on the north." An air beacon located at the summit is part of the national capital's air navigation system guiding air traffic towards the nearby Canberra Airport.

A walking trail which leads from the back of the Australian War Memorial, called the Mount Ainslie Kokoda summit trail, is well maintained with steps and is paved. The trail is used by around 200 people each day. It has a number of plaques commemorating the battles fought in World War II in the Kokoda Trail in Papua New Guinea, with the plaques set out as though it was on the Kokoda Trail. A quarry is located around 200 metres (660 ft) from the peak.

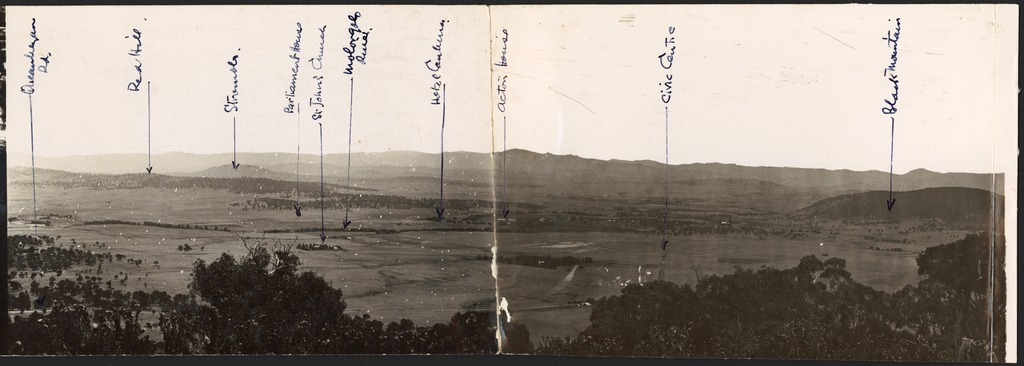
Panorama of the site for Canberra taken from Mt. Ainslie, 1910s / Frank Boland

Mount Ainslie is the northernmost point of a land axis, planned by Walter Burley Griffin, that stretches through North and South Canberra. This axis takes in the Australian War Memorial and the old and new Parliament Houses. In 1912, Burley won the international design competition for the capital and called the area an "irregular amphitheatre". The design included his wife's inputs, and thus the view from the summit of Mount Aisle was named as Marion Mahony Griffin in 2013.

== Summit design competition ==
In 2016 the ACT Government and the National Capital Authority ran a design competition for, with the aim to produce a ten-year strategy for the Mount Ainslie summit. The competition winners were Sue Barnsley and Jane Irwin, who proposed new parking, signage, picnic areas, lawns and plantings.
