= Mount Majura =

Mountain in Canberra, Australia

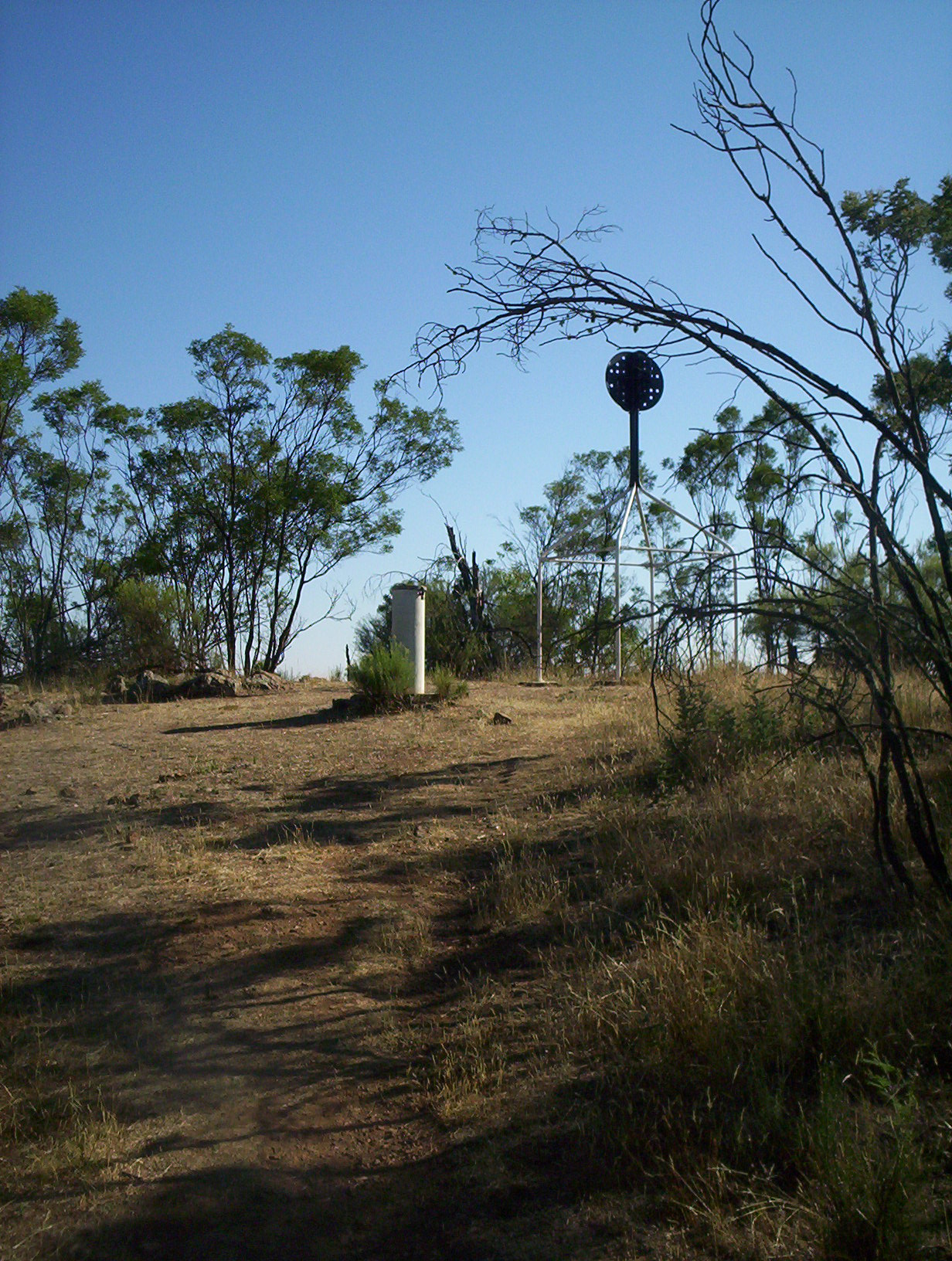
- Top of Mount Majura

Highest point
- Elevation: 890 m (2,920 ft)
- Coordinates: 35°14′15″S 149°10′50″E

Geography
- Location within Australian Capital Territory
- Location: Australian Capital Territory, Australia

Climbing
- Easiest route: Hike

Mount Majura is a small mountain with an elevation of 890 metres (2,920 ft) AHD that is located in the northern suburbs of Canberra in the Australian Capital Territory, Australia. Mount Majura lies close to the more prominent Mount Ainslie and is the highest point within the urban boundaries of Canberra. Mount Majura is contained within part of the Canberra Nature Park.

== Canberra Nature Park ==
Mount Majura is part of the Canberra Nature Park, lying at the eastern end of the suburb of Hackett, which is on the northeast edge of Canberra. At the summit of Mount Majura is a radar station and aircraft warning light for the nearby Canberra Airport. The station contains a primary and secondary radar system, as well as transmitters and receivers for Telstra, Optus, Vodafone and a repeater for the Canberra Amateur Radio Club. Canberra's North East electricity substation is also located near the base of the mountain and is accessed via walking paths on the Ainslie side. The road primarily serves the radar station and, unlike the road on Mount Ainslie, is unavailable to the public. However, there are popular walking trails which lead to the top of the mountain from Ainslie and Hackett. There is also an extensive series of single track bicycle trails on the eastern side, in an area known as Majura Pines. The hill is covered with native Australian trees, mostly eucalyptus, but is also home to a large number of highly sensitive rare plant species, including up to 26 species of terrestrial orchids.

Mount Majura's local volunteer park care group is known as the Friends of Mount Majura (FoMM).

Other large hills that are part of Canberra Nature Park include Mount Taylor, Mount Ainslie, Mount Mugga Mugga, Mount Stromlo and Black Mountain.

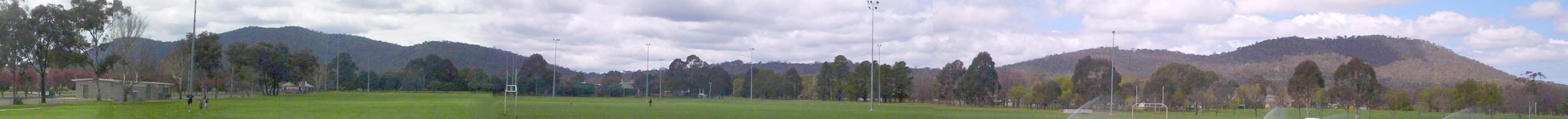
Mount Majura on the left with Mount Ainslie on the right, as viewed from Dickson oval.

== Etymology ==
Mount Majura was likely named by Robert Campbell, one of the first major land owners close to the mountain. Majura (or similar names, such as Majurygong or Majongbury) was a common place name recorded across the district on early surveys. The first map of the region, Thomas Mitchell's 1831 survey records 'Majura' as the area south of Bungendore, where Hoskinstown is now located. By 1835, an area just to the north of Bungendore was referred to as Majura. Mitchell's surveys include mainly Indigenous place-names, and the name may ultimately derive from such a name.

It is also believed that Majura may be named after a location in India. Campbell spent much of his life as a merchant trading between England, India and Australia. Some believe that Mount Majura is named after Majura Gate in the city of Surat. However this is unlikely since the Indian office of Campbell & Co. was located in the city of Kolkata.

== See also ==
- Canberra District wine region
