= Public housing in the Australian Capital Territory =

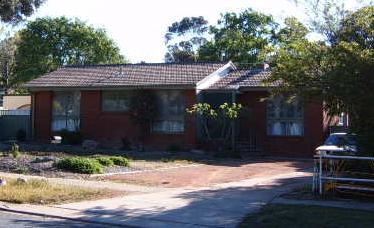
A government built house in the Belconnen district of Canberra

Government-owned housing in Canberra and the Australian Capital Territory has a history stemming from the decision to build the National Capital in the bush. In the early years Canberra's housing was entirely government-built and even after private development took over there has been a number of government houses included in almost every new suburb. Typical Canberra public housing is built on a limited number of plans repeated through an area of a suburb, with two or three bedrooms and constructed in unfinished brick veneer. They typically range in size from around 80 m^{2} to 130 m^{2}. The term Govie (pronounced guvvie) is a colloquialism used to describe the typical Canberran government built house.

== History ==
=== Early days ===
The earliest post-ACT housing in Canberra was the work camps for the labourers brought in to construct the new capital. By 1913 the workforce had reached 754 people. The majority lived in camps - single and married quarters - placed at the major work sites of now Acton (administration & first nursery area), Kingston (power house) Yarralumla (brickyards), and Cotter River (Water-Dam). Single men lived in tents and married men constructed their own humpies.

A few permanent cottages were constructed at Acton in the teen years of the twentieth century and by 1912 the timber accommodation known as "The Bachelors Quarters' was occupied.

The outbreak of World War I led to the slowing of work and a reduction of the workforce.

In 1921/22 the FCAC (Federal Capital Advisory Commission) had a number of brick cottages erected for tradesmen at Brickyards (7), opposite the Power House (modern Barton - 20 cottages) and at Civic (20). In 1923 a further 16 were constructed at Blandfordia (Forrest).

In 1921/22 the remaining buildings of the Molonglo Internment Camp (now Fyshwick) were converted into Canberra's first temporary settlement for workmen. It consisted of 120 houses and accommodation for 150 tradesmen. This settlement was followed in 1924 by 52 timber cottages (very small - 2 bedroom) at Westlake (now Stirling Park Yarralumla) and 15 at Acton. The following year in 1925 work commenced on another 20 at Causeway and these were followed in turn by another 80.

These few houses were quite insufficient for the number of construction workers living in the territory and in 1925 the FCC (Federal Capital Commission) made available 80 sites at Riverbourne (south side of the Molonglo River 3 miles from the Queanbeyan Post Office). At Riverbourne and Russell Hill (modern suburb of Campbell) where another 120 sites were made available men again were expected to construct their own cottages. Riverbourne closed in early 1927 and Russell Hill - opened in 1926 - lasted until the mid-1950s.

The temporary suburbs of Molonglo, Westlake, Acton workmen's cottages remained until in the case of Molonglo into the 1950s and Westlake/Acton in to the mid-1960s. Causeway remained until the mid-1970s when the timber temporary cottages were replaced with brick.

One contractor, John Howie, whose men built the Hotel Canberra, erected 25 timber cottages for his married men and 18 or more timber huts for his single men in the area of modern Stirling Park on the hill opposite Lotus Bay.

Single men continued to live under canvas until 1926 when the tents in the majority of settled camps were replaced with small cubicles constructed from baltic pine.

In 1925 three permanent' camps were erected for single men - south side at Causeway, centre of Canberra on Capitol Hill - and on the north side near modern Civic. This last mentioned camp was known as White City Camp and it was removed in the early 1930s when the land was required for building Canberra High School (now the Art School).

Capitol Hill (later named Capital Hill) Camp continued with additional buildings added after World War 2 into the 1960s.

Construction for the Public Servants being transferred to Canberra began 1925–26. The first couple of departments were transferred to Canberra in 1926 and were followed in early 1927 by the majority of departments transferred to Canberra.

People living in the temporary houses were unable to buy their cottages and did not receive any allowances for living in an area that was more expensive than the capital cities. Those transferring to the city, however, received allowances that ranged from around 19 pounds pa to 60-70 odd.

The rental cost for each cottage was based on the money paid for the construction of each. A cap was placed on building costs in each suburb which resulted in the lower paid officials transferring to Canberra being houses in Ainslie, North Ainslie and South Ainslie (now Braddon, Ainslie & Reid). The better paid officials moved into Forrest.

People were encouraged to buy their houses for the cost of construction only and any rent paid was included in the payment.

Single people transferring to the Territory were housed in Gorman House (females only in the early years), Beauchamp House, Brassey House (now Hotel Brassey), Hotel Acton, Hotel Ainslie (for short time only) and Hotel Kurrajong.

The Hotel Canberra was the first hostel to be built - in 1925 - to house politicians and even if a workman could afford the tariff he would not be allowed to stay there. The Kurrajong followed the next year and the others mentioned earlier with the exception of Gorman House (built 1925) were constructed in 1927.

The Federal Capital Commission was formed in 1925 to prepare the city for the transfer of public servants and their families. The commission had been preceded by the Federal Capital Advisory Committee which had overseen the commencement of construction of Canberra following the termination of the Walter Burley Griffin's contract.

In May 1925 the FCC decided to create a Social Service Association. This plan brought all the Progress Associations under the control of the FCC. A meeting was held and a document made that gives us the information about the numbers in each of the settlements and camps. Molonglo had a population of 750 and Westlake (Stirling Park) had 700 living in Howie's Settlement, Westlake Cottages and three government single camps.

The majority of houses constructed for those transferring to Canberra were built by private contractors with some day labour. HLB Lasseter was one who worked as a carpenter on the Ainslie cottages.

In 1927 the government approved construction of 545 government houses and for the first time approved the construction of 110 privately built houses. Unfortunately, the following year saw the approval of only 24 private dwellings, due mainly to the looming Great Depression. Even government construction was slowing down with only two houses under construction by the middle of 1928.

By 1941 there were only 400 privately owned houses in Canberra compared to 1633 government houses and a further 309 government-owned workers' cottages and tenements. World War II again brought a halt to housing construction in Canberra and by the end of the war Canberra's housing shortage was estimated at least 500 houses with 600 people on the government housing waiting list.

Those who were able to find the money to build within the required two-year period had the added problem of rationing of bricks etc.

In the post-World War 2 period many flats were built to help house those in desperate need of accommodation.

=== Post World War II ===
The years following the end of the war led to even greater demands for public housing in Canberra. Facing building supply shortages and ever-increasing demand for accommodation, alternate methods of housing construction were investigated. The ACT Advisory Council recommended that "temporary housing in the form of rebuilt Army huts be provided for at least 100 families, subject to it being assumed as a government responsibility that these huts be replaced by housing of adequate standard at a later stage.". Hostels were erected near modern-day Commonwealth Park, Reid, Kingston and Barton. The hostels were built using ex-military buildings moved from Narellan near Sydney and Mulwala in the Riverina.

In 1947 disused sleeping huts from Tocumwal air base were transported to Canberra and refitted as family homes. The huts had been built originally to resemble houses rather than barracks to avoid aerial detection and bombing. They are of weatherboard and fibro construction and have wide verandahs. 100 of the "Tocumwals" were erected in O'Connor around a central park. Some Tocumwals were also located in Ainslie. Many are still standing to this day. Unusually, the houses were erected without concrete foundations in order to save time and money; the brick footings sat on a double row of bricks laid directly onto the ground in a shallow trench.

In 1946 the government began experimenting with concrete construction, with a test concrete wall being added to a house in Turner. An initial contract of 100 monocrete prefabricated houses was tendered in 1946 for construction in Turner and O'Connor. A further group of 45 houses was scheduled for Yarralumla in 1948. Monocrete houses were also constructed in many other Canberra suburbs.

Other forms of prefabricated housing were tested during this time. The Beaufort aircraft factory built a prefabricated steel house in Ainslie. In 1948, a timber prefabricated house was imported from Finland and erected in Canberra. Riley-Newsum prefabricated houses were constructed at Duntroon, Ainslie, O’Connor and Deakin in the early 1950s.

Families arriving in Canberra soon after the war were often accommodated in hostels such as Reid House or the Acton Hotel, sometimes initially they were offered a room in the house of a colleague. Some families were split between hostels, and the government encouraged families to send their children away to boarding school.

The government also reversed its earlier policy and started building flats in Canberra. Between 1948 and 1952 four blocks of flats were built at Griffith, Braddon and Ainslie, containing a total of 184 one- and two-bedroom flats.

Even with these increased construction measures, waiting lists for public housing continued to increase. By 1955 the list contained more than 3000 families and individuals.

=== The NCDC ===
In March 1958 the National Capital Development Commission took responsibility for the planning and construction of Canberra. It inherited a public housing system with a waiting list of 3,000 people and imminent plans to move 3,000 more public servants from Melbourne and Sydney.

=== Self Government ===
In 1989 control of public housing in Canberra switched to the newly formed ACT government. By then the stock of government houses in Canberra was ageing. The standard of accommodation was lower than in other states and many houses were of non-conventional, high maintenance construction.

== Government housing today ==
Government housing in the ACT is now controlled by Housing and Community Services ACT a division of the ACT Department of Disability, Housing and Community Services. The public housing system in Canberra now contains over 11,000 properties. Criteria for allocation of housing was made more stringent in the 2006-07 Australian Capital Territory budget. Single people earning more than 60% of the average wage and couples earning more than 75% of the average wage will not be eligible.

== Modernisation ==
Government housing has been progressively sold off over the years into private ownership. Extensions, decks, bagging (cement render) and painting have re-made the Canberra Govie into a different yet still distinctive style of house. These privately owned properties are colloquially referred to as Ex-Govies.

In the 2006 budget, the Government announced it would sell a further 500 dwellings and use the proceeds to reinvest in other public housing.

== Forestry settlements ==
During the early years of the ACT the government built small forestry settlements at Uriarra, Pierces Creek and Stromlo. These settlements were devastated in the 2003 Canberra bushfires and their fate remains under consideration.

== See also ==
- Housing Commission of Victoria
- Housing NSW
- Supported Accommodation Assistance Program
- Homelessness in Australia
- HomeGround Services
