= Frank McMahon =

Frank McMahon may refer to:

- Frank McMahon (oilman) (1902–1986), Canadian businessman
- Frank McMahon (author) (1919–1984), Irish American writer and playwright
- Frank McMahon (footballer) (born 1950), Northern Irish footballer
- Frank McMahon (poet) (1926–2010), Australian writer and poet
