= Corroboree Park =

Park in Australian Capital Territory, Australia

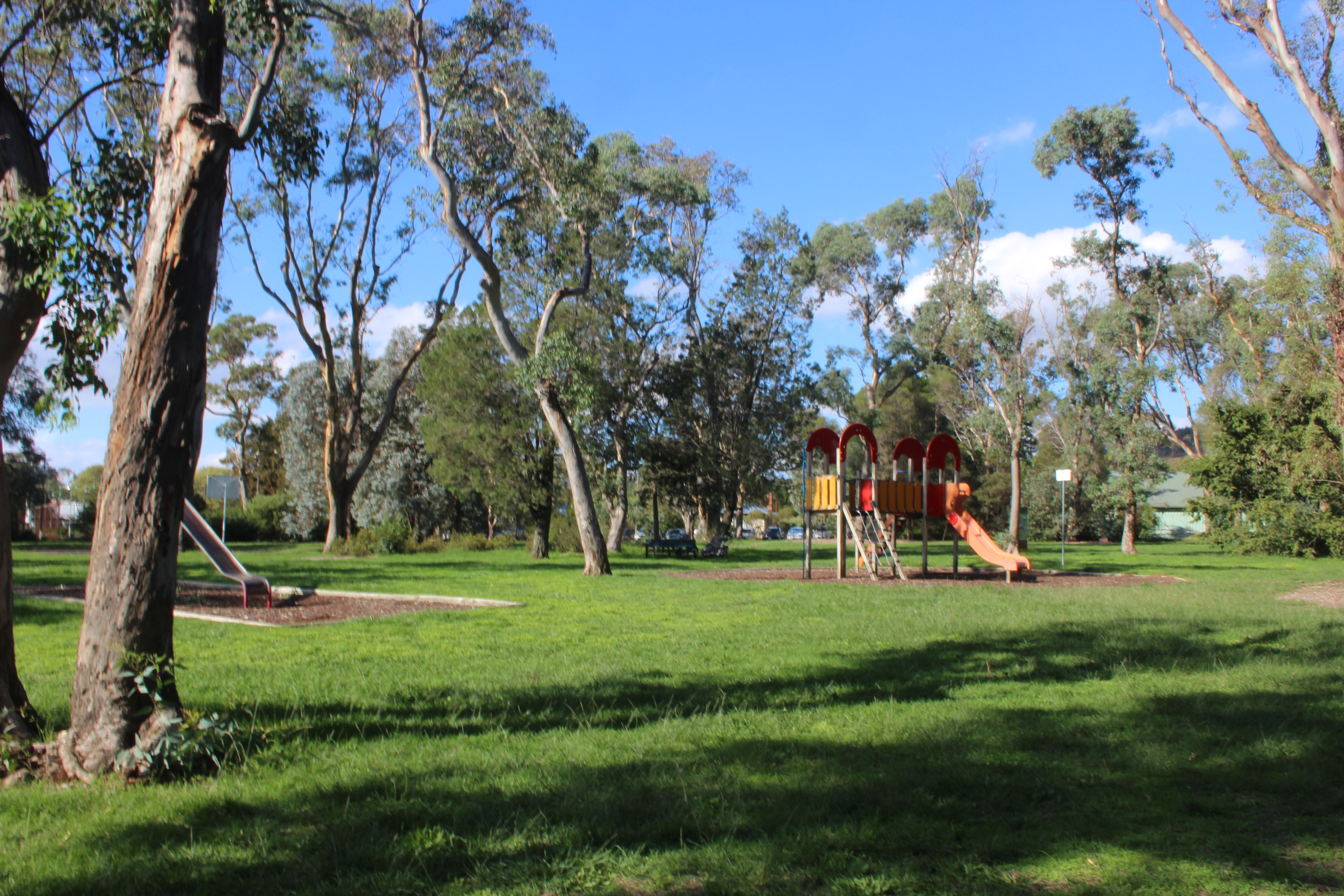
- Corroboree Park
- Interactive map of Corroboree Park
- Location: Ainslie, Australian Capital Territory
- Coordinates: 35°16′7″S 149°8′30″E

Corroboree Park is in Ainslie, ACT, Canberra, Australia. It is shaped like a semicircle, and is associated with the Aboriginal use of the area prior to European settlement in Canberra. The park was created around 1925 around the 'Corroboree Tree' located in the park. It is in a heritage registered area, and is also a registered heritage park.

== Park facilities ==
Ainslie Community Hall, which is located in Corroboree Park, is socially significant as one of the early meeting places in Canberra. The wooden hall was erected in 1927 and the adjoining 1920s school building was relocated to its current location from Russell. A fire-damaged part of the hall in 2000 and the school hall has had many internal upgrades including a commercial kitchen. The hall is often used for social gatherings, meetings and classes such as martial arts, yoga and dance.

The three courts for the Ainslie Tennis Club (established in 1927) were built using voluntary labour. The tennis club planted many of the trees in the park.

One asphalt-surfaced basketball court is located in the park, as are a small cricket pitch, and a children's playground.

The Corroboree Community Hall is managed by Northside Community Service on behalf of the ACT Government. The ACT Government has more information on the park on its website.

== Around the park ==
- Corroboree Park Housing Precinct heritage area
- Ainslie Shops
- Ainslie Football Club
- Mercure Canberra
