= Meridian Club =

Defunct LGBTQIA+ club in Canberra, Australia

- Meridian Club Incorporated
- Formation: August 5, 1986; 39 years ago
- Founders: Jeanette Baldwin
- Dissolved: June 20, 2002; 23 years ago
- Type: Community Organisation
- Registration no.: A01281
- Legal status: Incorporated Association
- Purpose: Gay and Lesbian Association
- Headquarters: 34 Mort Street, Braddon
- Location: Canberra, Australia
- Region served: Australian Capital Territory
- Members: 500+ (1993)
- Key people: Dr Peter Rowland
- Publication: The Meridian

The Meridian Club was a Canberra LGBTQIA+ bar and club that operated between 1986 and 2002. It was the first community owned and run not-for-profit club of its kind in Australia, and as of 2025 the only one in Canberra. The club published a monthly (Note: Except for December and January, which were combined) newsletter The Meridian, which served as an important resource for the community.

== History ==
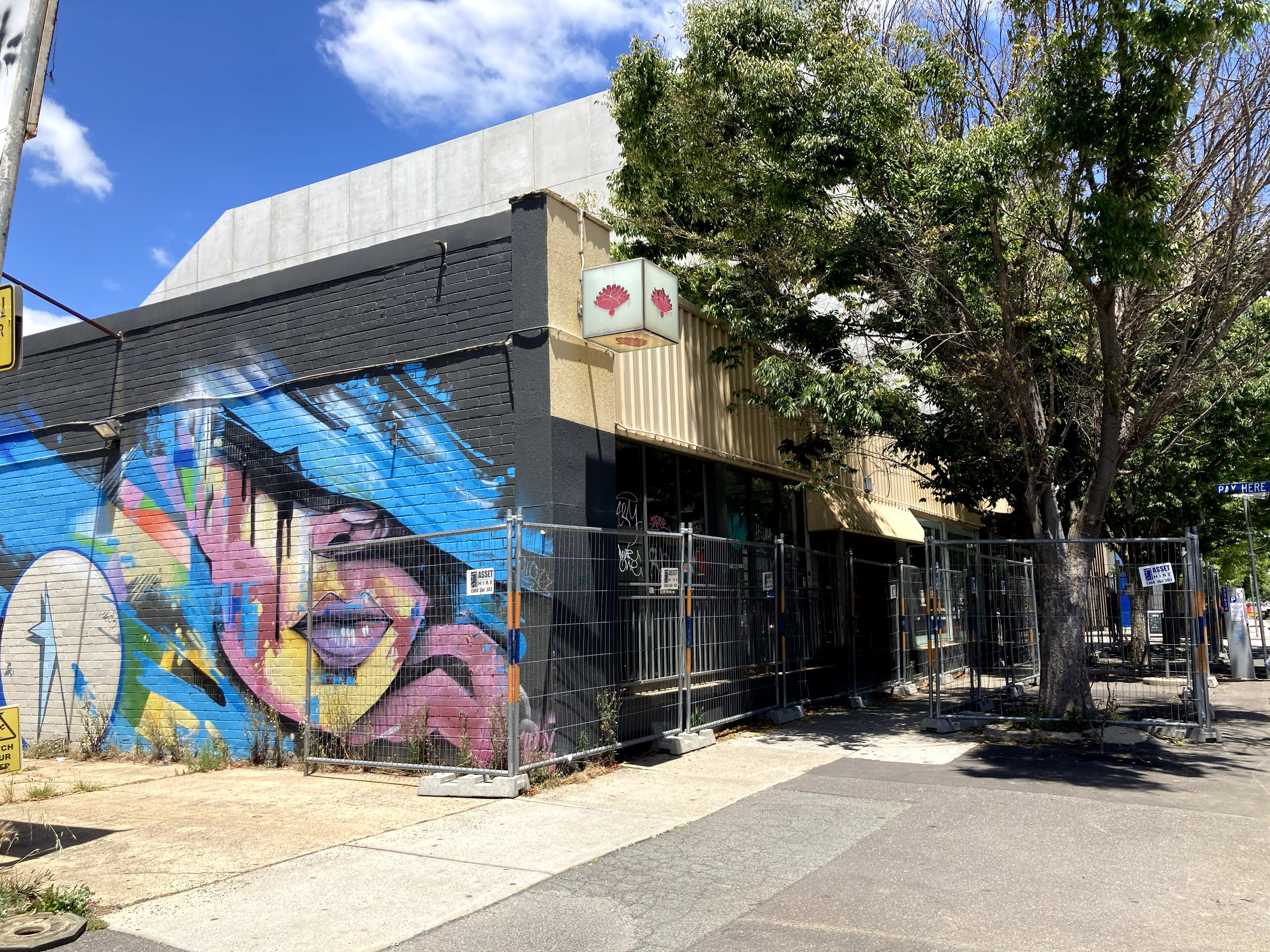
The former premises of the Meridian Club at 34 Mort Street, shortly before demolition in 2020

The origins of the Meridian Club were a series of social workshops organised by Jeanette Baldwin for gay patients of Dr Peter Rowland, a prominent doctor in the community at the time. After the success of these initial groups, the club was formally established in 1986 and operated out of the doctor's practice on Lonsdale Street, Braddon. The club eventually moved into the Gorman Arts Centre, then was temporarily moved to the ANU Bar after being expelled in 1990, before finally moving into its permanent location at 34 Mort Street, Braddon on 17 April 1991.

Following the opening of the Heaven Nightclub in 1993, the club faced decreasing attendance and financial issues and was almost wound up the following year. It subsequently reconfigured its offerings, and attendance improved. However, the club suffered financial issues throughout the 90's, losing $26,500 in the 1995-96 financial year and making just $1,700 in 1997-98.

Beginning 1994, Meridian began hosting the Canberra chapter of the Hellfire Club - a BDSM night and the first of its kind in the city. This attracted the attention of a member of the ACT Legislative Assembly, prompting threats by the Department of the Environment and Land Planning and the Liquor Licensing Board to review and potentially revoke the liquor license of the Meridian Club and the lease of the land owner. The opening night was attended by 250 participants as well as journalists from The Canberra Times and Canberra Weekly, who described the night as "pretty tame". Ultimately, no action came of the threats.

In 1996, "co-parent" and original host of the Meridian Club, Dr Peter Rowland was murdered in his home in what the NSW Police Force's Strike Force Parrabell later identified as a possible "bias crime". Rowland was active in the community, providing medical care to marginalized communities and was one of the founding members of the AIDS Action Council.

In 1997, their long running newsletter The Meridian merged with the nascent Quirk, the successor newsletter of the Poofs and Dykes Advocate (PanDA) which ran from 1992 to 97. The separate "Meridian News" section ended that year after the club president and newsletter editor Bill Nauenberg chose to leave his position, and the magazine and club had a falling out in 1998.

Meridian eventually closed in 2002 after 17 years in operation and the former premises were demolished in 2020.

== Cultural Impact ==
Between its formation and the late 90s, the Meridian Club was a cornerstone social hub for queer people in the Canberra region, not only acting as bar and club but also hosting various sport and social associations. Their newsletter, The Meridian, included classified ads for safe businesses, opinion articles, and community calendars.

Today, the Meridian Club is the namesake of the LGBTQIA+ health and social support organisation Meridian ACT, which adopted the name in 2020 (from AIDS Action Council) to better represent their current goals and mission. Chief Minister Andrew Barr met his husband at the Meridian Club in 2001.
