= Lawson House =

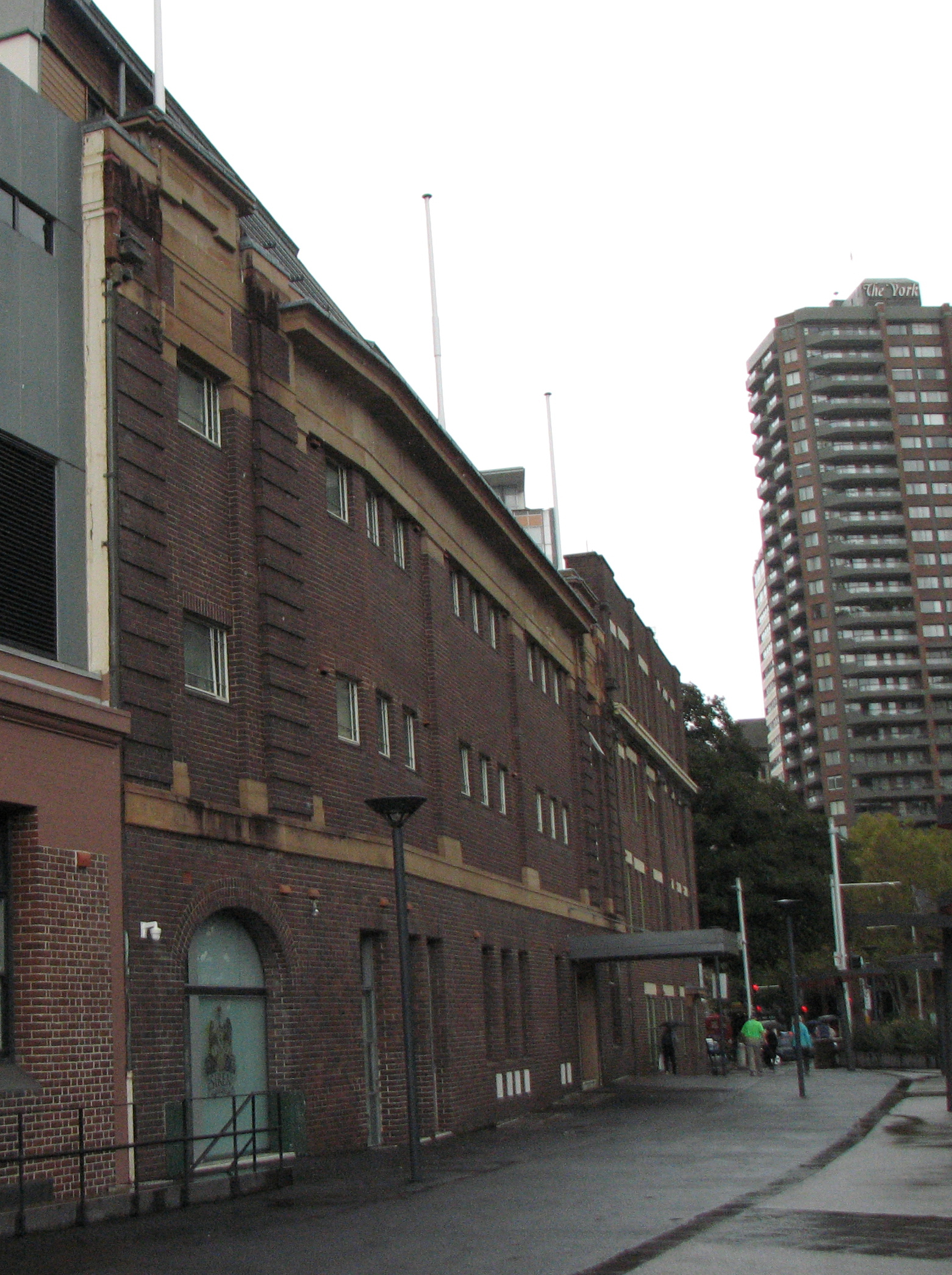
- Lawson House, 212–218 Cumberland Street, The Rocks, NSW

- Location within Sydney Location within Australia
- 33.8629°S 151.2057°E
- Location: 212–218 Cumberland Street, The Rocks, City of Sydney, New South Wales, Australia

History
- Built: 1924

Site notes
- Architect: John Burcham Clamp
- Architectural style: Inter-War period in the Free Classical
- Owner: Property NSW

New South Wales Heritage Register
- Official name: Lawson House; Cadbury-Fry Building; Lawson Menzies Building
- Type: State heritage (built)
- Designated: 10 May 2002
- Reference no.: 1557
- Type: Warehouse/storage area
- Category: Commercial
- Builders: Burcham Clamp and Finch

Lawson House is a heritage-listed warehouse, auction house and offices located at 212–218 Cumberland Street, in the inner city Sydney suburb of The Rocks in the City of Sydney local government area of New South Wales, Australia. It was designed by John Burcham Clamp and built during 1924 by Burcham Clamp and Finch. It is also known as Cadbury-Fry Building and Lawson Menzies Building. The property is owned by Property NSW, an agency of the Government of New South Wales. It was added to the New South Wales State Heritage Register on 10 May 2002.

== History ==
The site is known to have been occupied from the early years of the nineteenth century, although it was probably occupied in the first weeks after the arrival of the First Fleet. Lesueur's 1802 "Plan of the Town" shows the first St Philip's Church at the end of Gloucester Street and some buildings indicated in the vicinity of the subject site. The alignment of Gloucester and Cumberland Street was already established. The 1803–1807 field book of surveyor Charles Grime noted four owner/occupiers on two or three allotments on the site. James Meehan's 1807 "Plan of the Town of Sydney in NSW" indicates the site and nearby parcels of land were leasehold, at this time the site was still Crown Land.

By 1822, the settlement of The Rocks was reasonably well established and plans show single allotments occupying the site, probably dwellings. Nine years later the Hodd, Lanner and Mitchell "Map of the Town of Sydney" provided street names and both Cumberland and Gloucester Streets terminating at Charlotte Place (now Grosvenor Street). Land at the subject site remained Crown Land until the 1830s and the Department of Lands titles information shows the site to be an amalgamation of various lots granted at this time as part of Section 64 including all of Lot 13 granted to William Davis in 1836, part of lot 15 to Thomas Bray and Edward McRoberts in 1839, part of lot 12 to Elizabeth Gaunson in 1840, part of lot 11 to James Glover in 1840 and part of lot 16 to Christopher Crane. The whole of lot 14 was granted to William Henry Dowling in 1841.

The Sydney Council Rates books and the Sands Directory from the 1850s highlights the residential character of the site, there is little or no indication of industry on the site. There was some commercial use in the form of boarding houses and businesses operating from residences such as boot makers, dressmakers, jewellers and tailors. The dwellings were in private ownership until approximately 1907 when the land was acquired by the NSW Government in The Rocks Resumptions following the outbreak of the plague.

The site was dominated by large brick and stone terraces characteristic of residential investment in The Rocks, there were some wooden buildings and smaller scale single storey dwellings on the site, but according to the rates books these were constructed earlier. By the 1870s the predominant construction medium was brick and majority of residences were at least two storeys. Some of these buildings remained on the site until the 1920s.

The first Cadbury factory was built in Australia in 1922 in Tasmania following the company's successful English merger with Fry and Sons. Australia had been an important market for the company since the 1880s. Two years after the factory opened in Tasmania in 1921 application was made to construct a depot in Sydney. The Cumberland Street site was perfect because of its close proximity to the wharves, ensuring ease of delivery of products from Tasmania. The building opened as a warehouse and distribution centre in 1924, it was designed by the Sydney firm of Burcham Clamp and Finch. Cadbury Fry continued in the building until c. 1957, during World War II they were the official suppliers of chocolate to the armed forces.

In 1958 Craig Mostyn and Co moved into the building and also used it as a warehouse, packing and distribution centre. This company began in 1923 exporting leather, harvested wattle bark for the tanning industry and sold tanning machinery in Australia. Through the 1920s & 30s they expanded into other Australian products including eucalyptus oil, wool, rabbit skins and tallow. The company gradually expanded acquiring mills, exporting fruit and by 1960 were a large exporter of bark.

The building was occupied by the auctioneer company, Lawson's in 1982. Lawson's had been a well known auctioneer since 1870 when James R. Lawson established himself as a leading Sydney auctioneer, at that time everything from groceries to sailing ships were auctioned. In September 2001 the Menzies Group of Companies acquired Lawson's and the company expanded into two brands with the Cumberland Street office known as Lawson-Menzies. This company targeted the upper end of the Australian auction market for art, wine, jewels, decorative art and prestigious house contents.

== Description ==
The building is a robust dark brick building with sandstone trim, including strong parapet feature. It has three levels to Cumberland Street, and four levels to Gloucester Street. The building, commenced in 1924, is of the Inter-War period in the Free Classical style, displaying the characteristic classical elements introduced into an otherwise simple exterior. Classical features include large dentilled cornice to sandstone parapet (with protective lead capping), articulated brick pilasters (with decorative 'quoins'). The steel framed windows are typically small and operate by pivot. Where window is multi-paned, the central windows pivots, and the top and bottom sashes are fixed.

The entrance foyer appears to be in original condition, with marble floors, threshold and wall lining, and original timber doors. Inner entry doors are timber with bevelled glass panels. A plaque in the entry foyer refers to Lawson's occupation of the building in 1982, as opened by the NSW Governor, Air Marshal Sir James Rowland, for JR Lawson Pty Ltd.

Internally, the southern end retains a significant degree of original fabric, and layout, including timber panelling, timber joinery (doors, architraves, skirting boards, glazed partitions, staircase). The northern end, is largely divided by modern partition walls. The ceiling is modern - suspended acoustic.

=== Condition ===
As at 27 April 2001, Archaeology Assessment Condition: Mostly disturbed. Assessment Basis: Basements. Archaeology mostly disturbed, basements cut into bedrock.

=== Modifications and dates ===
- 1949 – Installation of bowser tank and under ground piping for petrol, petrol fill box installed. Removed in 1958.
- 1967 – Application to City Council to replace goods lift with a new passenger lift, erection of a rooftop lift motor room and laying new floor decking.
- 1969 – Alteration to the exterior western Cumberland Street elevation, including the filling in with brickwork two of the southernmost dock entrances, the erection of an internal wall, the removal of interior partitions and the repositioning of fire doors. The new face brickwork was proposed to match the existing and three new windows were designed to complement the contemporary ground floor windows and were aligned vertically with the smaller windows on the second storey above. Existing vents were repositioned in the new brickwork. Internally, the floors at the northern end of the building were raised. A new ceiling was constructed below the original beams and acoustic tiles were applied to match existing panels and for soundproofing. The petrol pump installed by Cadbury was relocated to the northernmost dock where the floor was retained at the existing level.
- 1995 – New fire safety facilities including new fire doors and installation of smoke detectors and portable fire extinguishers. New lighting in the fire stairs.
- 1994 – Waterproofing membrane to the roof, sump and gutter and downpipe repairs.
- 1995 – Building refurbished, some internal partitions demolished, floor finishes modified and security gates to the loading dock installed. Original 1924 strong room demolished. Tea room refurbished and toilet / kitchen facilities upgraded. First floor refurbishment to first floor, tea room, new timber staircase installed, bathroom demolished and new toilet and kitchen installed. Removal of partitions on second floor and installation of data and telecommunications area and refurbishment of WC.
- 1996 – Awning on Cumberland Street remodelled, new carpet installed on staircases.
- 2000 – First floor kitchens and bathrooms refitted.
- No date – Alterations to facades including vehicular entrance on Gloucester Street and provision of security bars on Cumberland Street ground floor windows.

== Heritage listing ==
As at 30 March 2011, Lawson House and site are of State heritage significance for their historical and scientific cultural values. The site and building are also of State heritage significance for their contribution to The Rocks area which is of State Heritage significance in its own right.

Lawson's is significant as a robust Inter-War Free Classical style warehouse building, remaining in commercial operation. It has a high degree of integrity, retaining much of its original layout and features internally and externally. Original/early aspects of the building include the brick and stone elevations, steel framed windows, marble finishes, timber joinery and overall layout, and are of historic and aesthetic significance. The form of the building responds sympathetically to the curve of Cumberland Street.

Lawson House was constructed c. 1924 as the Sydney Depot for the Cadbury-Fry confectionery company and designed in the Inter War Free Classical style by architects Burcham Clamp and Finch.

Historically, the building is evident of the Inter War period of development that occurred in The Rocks. It is significant for the contribution the building makes to the historical and scientific values of The Rocks. It also forms a small precinct of Interwar commercial buildings which replaced Victorian period housing that was intended to be resumed prior to the First World War. Historically, the building is associated with well known confectionery company Cadbury-Fry Pascal Pty Ltd although the use was relatively short lived, it was not a flagship building of the company and the ability to interpret this association has been eroded as the use has ceased and machinery removed.

Lawson House is also associated with the well known Sydney architectural firm Burcham Clamp and Finch. Stylistically and structurally it is similar to the other buildings designed by John Burcham Clamp but owing to its construction date it does not demonstrate the progressive techniques of style and construction that are evident in a number of his other buildings.

Lawson House is aesthetically and technically representative of restrained example the Inter War Free Classical style of architecture featuring a robust form, prominent end bays, dressed stone detailing, timber partitions and other early finishes to office and office foyer spaces. The building structure is relatively common for the period and typical for buildings used as commercial warehouses.

The site demonstrates some research potential for relics related to the former residential use of the site from the mid nineteenth century.

Lawson House was listed on the New South Wales State Heritage Register on 10 May 2002 having satisfied the following criteria.

The place is important in demonstrating the course, or pattern, of cultural or natural history in New South Wales.

Constructed in c. 1924, Lawson House is historically representative of the Inter War phase of commercial redevelopment in the state significant precinct of The Rocks. The site was originally planned for resumption in the early part of the twentieth century, however this was interrupted by the First World War (1914–18) and redevelopment of the site and some surrounding properties did not occur until the 1920s. Consequently, the building stock in this area consists largely of commercial buildings which contrasts to the terrace housing and flat buildings constructed during the Federation period of resumptions. Lawson House is one in a group of four Inter-War commercial buildings in the block bounded by Grosvenor, Gloucester, Essex and Cumberland Streets.

The place has a strong or special association with a person, or group of persons, of importance of cultural or natural history of New South Wales's history.

The building was originally constructed for use as a factory and warehouse for the well known company Cadbury Fry who have produced confectionary in Australia since the 1920s. The subject building was not the flagship but the Sydney Depot and a centre to facilitate trade. The change in the use of the building after more than 30 years of occupation and the removal of machinery has hindered the ability to interpret the use by Cadbury-Fry.

The place is important in demonstrating aesthetic characteristics and/or a high degree of creative or technical achievement in New South Wales.

Lawson House is a largely intact example of an Inter-War Free Classical warehouse building. It is considered to be an aesthetically representative example of an Inter War Free Classical commercial building. The building makes a strong contribution to the streetscape and the urban morphology of The Rocks.

== See also ==
- Australian non-residential architectural styles
