= Ainslie, Australian Capital Territory =

Suburb of Canberra, Australia

Ainslie
- Suburb
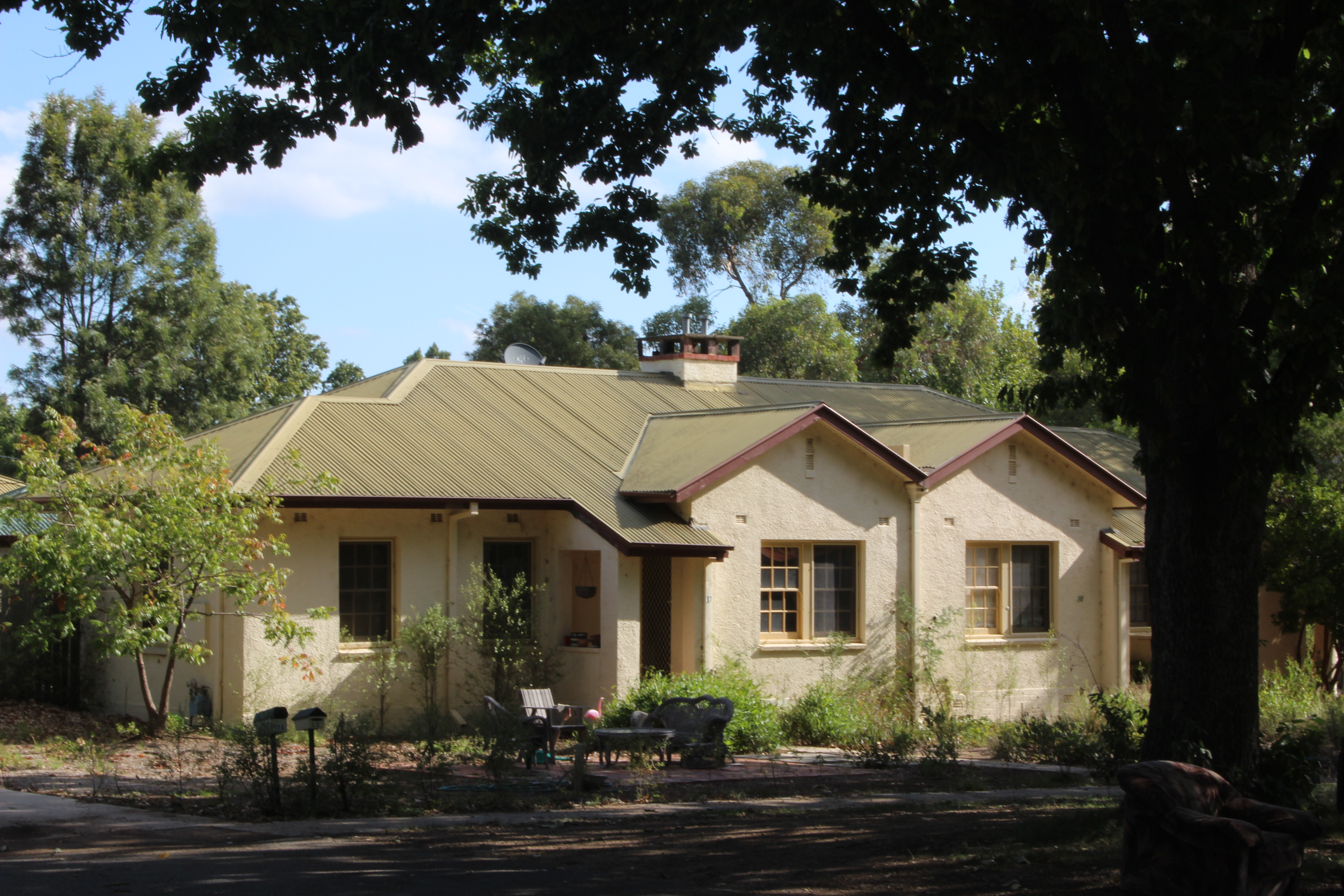
- Wakefield Gardens Housing Precinct house

- Coordinates: 35°15′46″S 149°08′39″E
- Country: Australia
- State: Australian Capital Territory
- City: Canberra
- District: North Canberra
- Location: 3 km (1.9 mi) NNE of Canberra CBD; 17 km (11 mi) NW of Queanbeyan; 87 km (54 mi) SW of Goulburn; 284 km (176 mi) SW of Sydney
- Established: 1928

Government
  - Territory electorate: Kurrajong
  - Federal division: Canberra

Area
  - Total: 3.5 km^{2} (1.4 sq mi)
- Elevation: 590 m (1,940 ft)

Population
  - Total: 5,376 (2021 census)
  - Density: 1,536/km^{2} (3,980/sq mi)
- Postcode: 2602
Suburbs around Ainslie
Dickson	Dickson	Hackett
Braddon	Ainslie	Canberra Nature Park
Reid	Campbell	Canberra Nature Park

Ainslie is a suburb of Canberra, Australia in the North Canberra district.

The suburb is bounded by Limestone Avenue and Majura Avenue to the west and north, Phillip Avenue to the north-east, Mount Ainslie to the east and Quick Street to the south.

Ainslie is within walking distance of the central business district, the nature trails of Mount Ainslie, the Australian War Memorial and the many restaurants of Dickson. It has many attractions: a central location, with equally easy access to the CBD and the bush trails of Mount Ainslie; the abundance of early twentieth-century, heritage-listed houses; mature deciduous street trees and general leafiness; and a local shopping centre.

== Suburb amenities ==
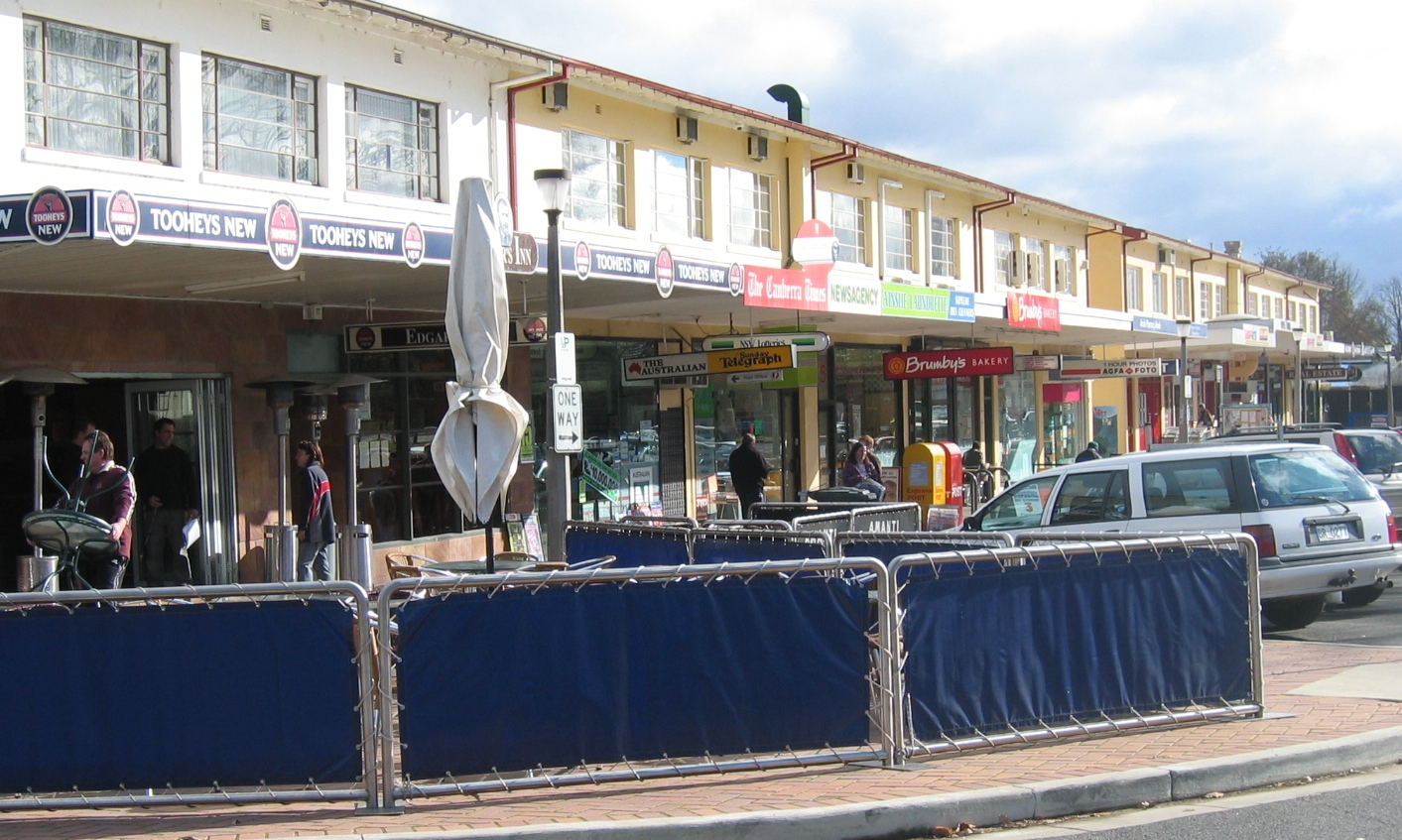
Ainslie shops

The local shops are located in the middle of Ainslie, and there is an IGA store, a cafe, restaurant, liquor store, pharmacy, laundrette, Pilates studio and newsagent. The suburb has a playschool, the Inner North Playschool, a preschool (Baker Gardens Preschool), the Ainslie Football Club, and the Ainslie Fire Station, which serves the North Canberra area. The North Ainslie Primary School is located in the suburb, but Ainslie School, one of Canberra's oldest, is located in Braddon on the western side of Limestone Ave (Braddon was originally called "Ainslie" with the current Ainslie and another early neighbouring suburb, Reid, were originally called "North Ainslie" and "South Ainslie" respectively). Ainslie Village, which is actually in Campbell, provides accommodation for homeless adults, or those at risk of homelessness.

Ainslie residents can access Mount Ainslie simply by walking uphill. There is an easy paved walk to the top, and also a "goat track" straight up the side of the hill. Kangaroos come down from the mountain at night and eat grass from the nature strips in front of local houses.

The Anglican All Saints Church, built in the 1860s of stone, is located on Cowper Street in Ainslie. It was relocated from Sydney in 1957 and originally served as the railway terminus at Rookwood Cemetery. It is listed by the ACT Heritage Council.

== Design ==
The suburb is characterized by leafy streets, and mainly by detached single dwelling houses. Many see a "village" atmosphere around the many small parks. Ainslie has experienced "in-fill" development in recent years, both in the form of dual occupancy dwellings (where two dwellings are constructed on a block which previously contained one house) and medium-density development, especially at the Limestone Avenue ends of Cowper Street and Angus Street and, more recently, on the site of the former service station at the Ainslie shops.

== History ==
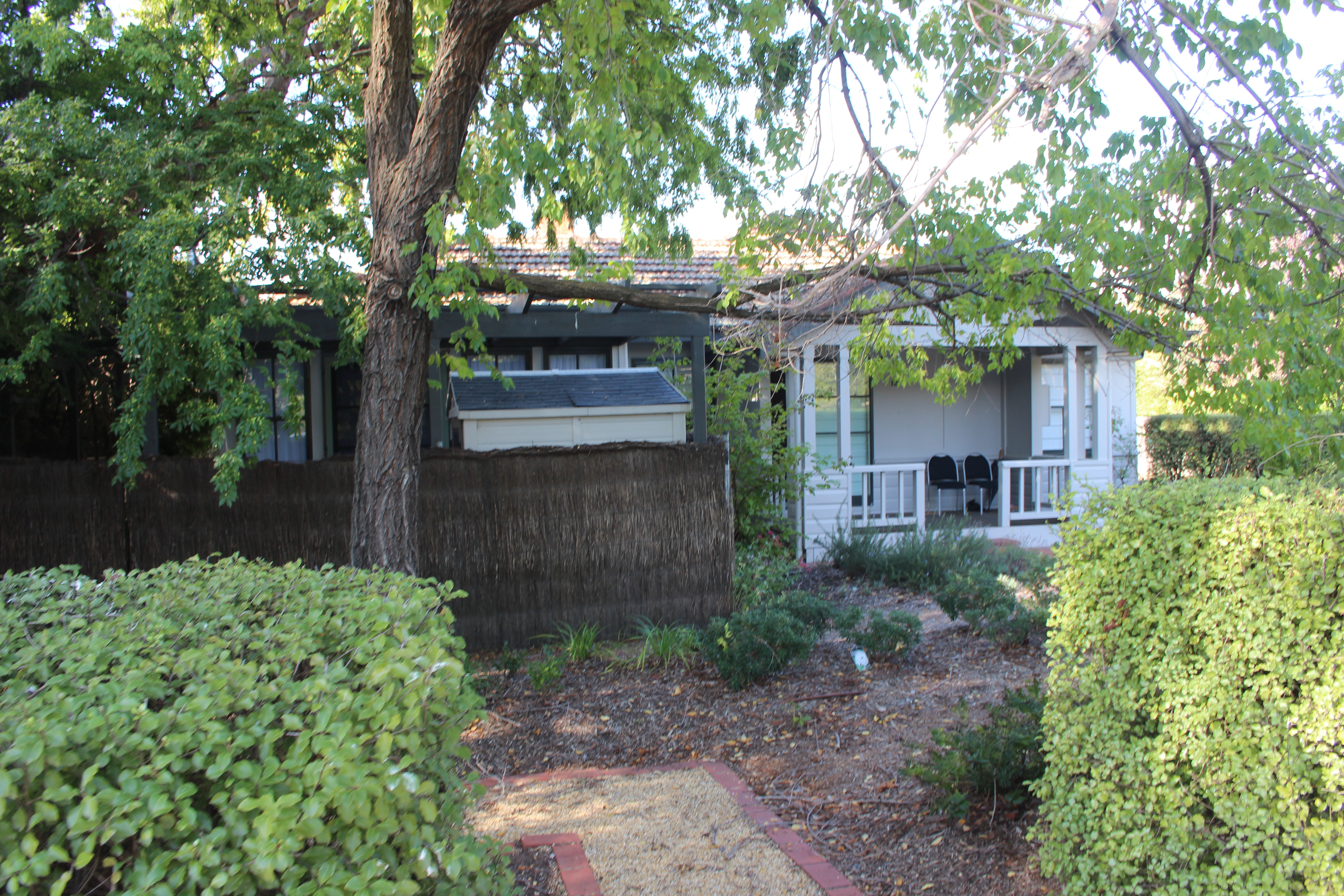
Corroboree Park Housing Precinct house

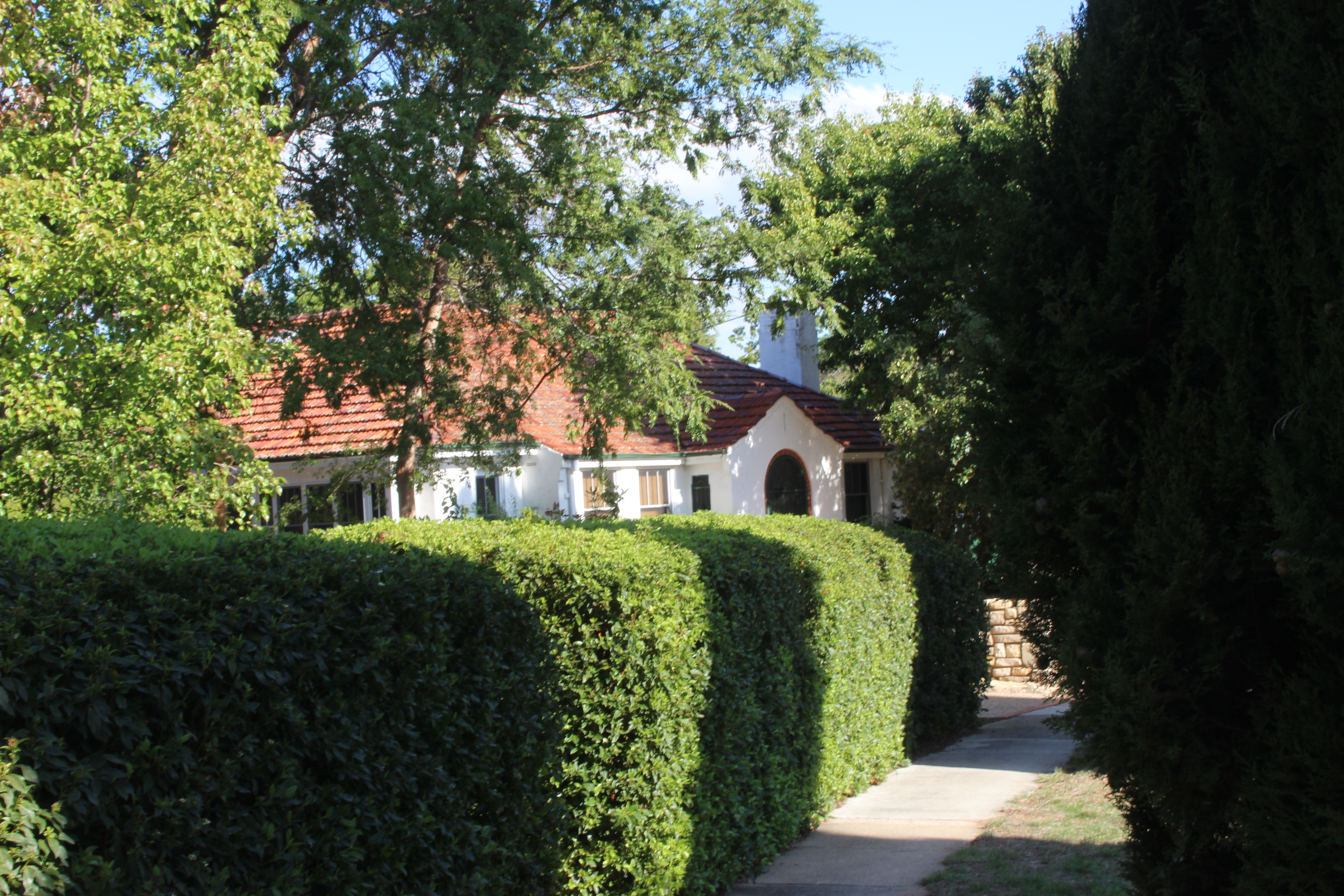
Alt Crescent Housing Precinct house

The suburb was named after James Ainslie, a veteran of the Battle of Waterloo, the "first overseer of 'Duntroon Station' in Canberra who was employed by Robert Campbell in 1825 to drive a mob of sheep south from Bathurst 'until he found suitable land'; Ainslie chose the Limestone Plains (the Canberra district) and was overseer for ten years before returning to Scotland."

James Ainslie was reputed to have camped in 1825 under gum trees at what is now Corroboree Park. Iris Carnell, born in 1900 and one of the original inhabitants of Paterson Street in the 1920s, recounted in "Voices of Old Ainslie" that her mother, Celia Tong, born at Lanyon in 1871, remembered as a little girl what is now Corroboree Park as a scene of Aboriginal corroborees. She said the Aboriginal people used to sit around the tree now near the barbecues which has four trees growing from its centre.

Ainslie has three housing precincts planned on Garden City principles that were gazetted onto the ACT Government's Heritage Register in 2004. The first stage of the Corroboree Park precinct was constructed between 1925 and 1927 to accommodate tradesmen for the construction of the city. The Alt Crescent precinct was designed for the members of the Federal Capital Commission and built in 1926. The houses were originally occupied by the founding staff of the FCC. The curved street design appears to derive from Walter Burley Griffin's original plan for Canberra, which shows a small crescent off Limestone Avenue at the end of Ainslie Avenue. The first stage of the Wakefield Gardens precinct was constructed between 1925 and 1929 to accommodate lower income public servants and workmen for the opening of the new Parliament House in Canberra in 1927.

The division (or suburb) name Ainslie was gazetted by the Government in 1928. The streets of Ainslie are named after pioneers and legislators.

Iris Carnell also records that when the Duke and Duchess of York came to Canberra to open Parliament House in 1927, the Duchess, later Queen Elizabeth, the Queen Mother, expressed an interest in visiting a typical local family. She was invited to tea with the Truesdale family at 20 Corroboree Park (on the northern corner of Higgins Crescent).

Originally a predominantly blue-collar suburb with a high proportion of public housing, Ainslie has gradually gentrified, with properties regularly fetching more than $1 million. The suburb includes heritage-listed cottages built during the conservative governments of Stanley Bruce and Joseph Lyons, which are set mainly among European trees.

In 2025, a small cohousing development named Stellulata opened in Anslie. The suburban block houses three couples, each in their own private dwelling, plus a guest room, shared gardens and communal spaces. It was selected by the ACT government as a demonstration project to test whether this model of collaborative living would be suitable more generally to Canberra residents.

== Open space ==
Ainslie has many parks and open spaces.

- Corroboree Park is shaped like a semicircle, and is associated with the Aboriginal use of the area prior to European settlement in Canberra. The park was created around 1925 around what is known as the "Corroboree Tree" located in the park. Ainslie Community Hall, which is located in Corroboree Park, is socially significant as one of the early meeting places in Canberra. The wooden hall was erected in 1927 and the adjoining 1920s school building was relocated to its current location from Russell. The hall is often used for social gatherings, meetings and classes such as yoga and dance. The three courts for the Ainslie Tennis Club (established in 1927) were built using voluntary labour. The tennis club planted many of the trees in the park.
- It contains several sports ovals, one of which is part of the Ainslie Football Club.
- It contains North Ainslie Primary School which has a generous oval.
- It borders the Mount Ainslie Nature Reserve.

== Demographics ==
In the 2021 census, the population of Ainslie was 5,376, including 99 (1.8%) Indigenous persons and 4,029 (74.9%) Australian-born persons. 72.5% of dwellings were separate houses (compared to the Australian average of 72.3%), while 16.8% were semi-detached, row or terrace houses (Australian average: 12.6%) and 10.1% were flats, units or apartments (Australian average: 14.2%). 39.1% of the population were professionals, compared to the Australian average of 22.2%. Notably 24.6% worked in central government administration, compared to the Australian average of 1.2%, although the ACT-wide average is a similar 17.1%. 56.5% of the population had no religion, compared to the Australian average of 38.4%.

== Governance ==
2025 House election
Labor	48.25%
Greens	30.48%
Independent	9.13%
Liberal	9.03%
2025 Senate election
Pocock	49.44%
Labor	27.72%
Greens	12.30%
Liberal	8.15%
2024 ACT election
Labor	35.8%
Greens	25.1%
Liberal	15.2%
IFC	14.5%

Ainslie is located within the federal electorate of Canberra and it is represented by Alicia Payne for the Labor Party. In the ACT Legislative Assembly, Ainslie is part of the electorate of Kurrajong, which elects five members on the basis of proportional representation, two Labor, one Green, one Liberal and one independent. Polling place statistics are shown to the right for the Ainslie North polling place at North Ainslie Primary School in the 2025 federal and 2024 ACT elections.

== Geology ==
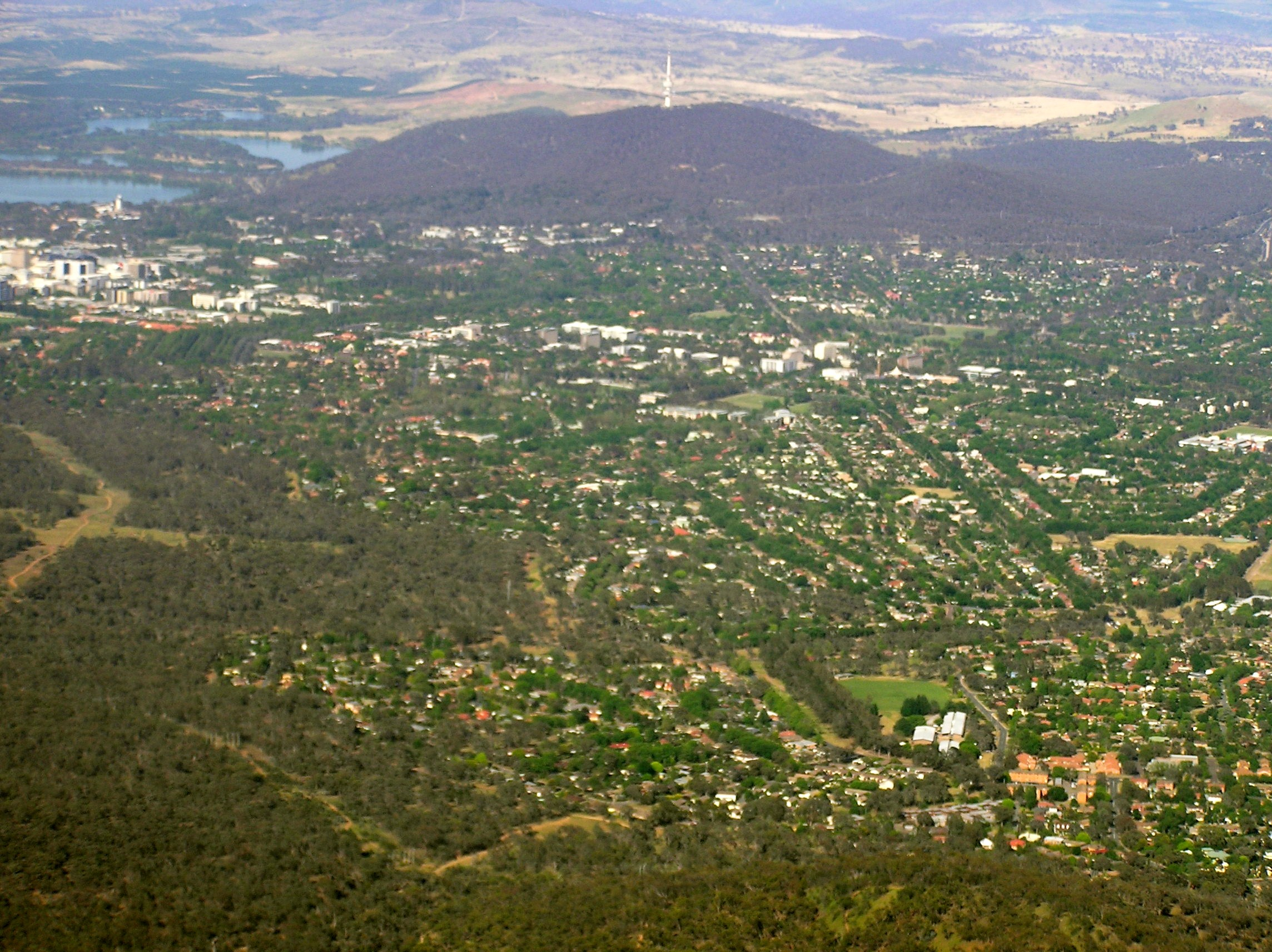
Aerial view from north east. Mount Ainslie is to the left.

Calcareous shales from the Canberra Formation from the Silurian period is overlain by Quaternary alluvium. This rock is the limestone of the original title of Canberra "Limestone Plains". Mount Ainslie itself is composed of the Ainslie Volcanics.

== Notable residents ==
- Frank McMahon
- Arthur Moore
- Lajos Kazár

== References and further reading ==
- Macdonald, Emma (14 February 2014). "A weekend in your suburb: 36 hours in Ainslie". The Canberra Times. Archived from the original on 14 February 2014.
- Lyon, Louise, ed. (1995), Voices of Old Ainslie, National Capital Printing
- Wright, Tony (5 February 2010), "Misadventures in the People's Republic", The Age, archived from the original on 7 February 2010
