= Burcham Clamp =

Australian architect

- Born: John Burcham Clamp; 3 November 1869
- Died: 7 July 1931 (aged 61); Cremorne, Sydney, New South Wales, Australia
- Other name: J. Burcham Clamp
- Education: University of Sydney; Sydney Technical College
- Occupation: Architect
- Spouse: Susie Young
- Parents: John Clamp; Sophia, née Hunt
- Practice: Clamp and T. M. Smith; Clamp and Walter Burley Griffin; Clamp and C. H. Mackellar

John Burcham Clamp (1869–1931) (known as Burcham Clamp) was an architect born on 30 November 1869 at 743 George Street, Sydney. Known as Burcham, he won the Mort scholarship in 1882. In 1886 he received honorable mention in the student design competition of the Institute of Architects of New South Wales. In 1889 Clamp was awarded its gold medal; that May he was the first student admitted to its membership.

== Early life ==
Clamp was born in 1869, the son of a hairdresser, John Clamp, and Sophia, née Hunt from Dublin. He was educated at the school of Christ Church St Laurence. In 1883, he became an articled clerk to the architect Henry Kent. He attended evening classes at the University of Sydney and Sydney Technical College. In 1889, while still a student, he was admitted to membership of the Institute of Architects of New South Wales.

== Career ==
In 1899, Clamp went briefly into partnership with T. M. Smith, before establishing an independent practice in 1901 when he set up on his own and became known for efficient planning, competent design and secure construction. By 1910 he had been responsible for St James's Hall, Phillip Street; Victoria Hall, Manly; Lister Private Hospital and nurses' home, Darlinghurst; and such major projects as the enlargement of Winchcombe, Carson Limited's Pyrmont wool store, and Wyoming and Castlereagh chambers in the city. His most controversial commission was to rebuild Farmer & Company's Victoria House in Pitt Street obliterating J. Horbury Hunt's 1874 building which had been acclaimed as 'our finest example of street architecture'. Clamp's meeting with Walter Burley Griffin in the United States of America led to a brief partnership with him in Sydney in 1914. Later he was joined by C. H. Mackellar and they designed several factories and other buildings in 1918-24.In 1914 he was briefly in partnership with Walter Burley Griffin. Between 1918 and 1924 he worked with C. H. Mackellar. Clamp was the building surveyor for the Anglican Diocese of Sydney, and many of his buildings were for the diocese. He also built many commercial premises in and around Sydney.

An active Anglican and prominent Freemason, Clamp was building surveyor for the diocese of Sydney, and exercised considerable influence in ecclesiastical architecture: among other projects he designed the Sydney Church of England Grammar School (Shore) Chapel, North Sydney, St Matthew's Church, Manly (with Wright and Apperly) and converted a two-storey house at Rushcutters Bay into St Luke's Hospital. He was also a founder and councilor of Cranbrook School, altering the house after its use as the residence of the State governor in 1901-15, designing new buildings and landscaping its grounds. Clamp and (C. H.) Finch were the architects between 1927 and 1930 of Tattersall's Club, Castlereagh Street, the Buckland Memorial Church of England Boys' Home, Carlingford, Canberra Grammar School and the Ainslie Hotel in Canberra. Early in 1930 Clamp's son John replaced Finch.

An active member of the local Institute of Architects, Clamp supported the federation of the separate State bodies and in 1907 supported the admission of Florence Parsons as an associate. He was a member of the Town Planning Association of New South Wales, the Martin Place extension committee, Tattersall's, the Millions, and the National clubs. Practicing during two expansion periods in 1901–14 and 1920–28, Clamp's work spanned nineteenth-century romantic and twentieth-century functionalist styles, incorporating distinct designs intended for commercial use.

Burcham Clamp died of acute broncho-pneumonia on 7 July 1931 at Cremorne home and was buried in the Anglican section of South Head Cemetery.

== Personal life ==
On 22 June 1893 John Burcham Clamp married Susie Young at Auburn; They later lived at Cremorne and around 1914 they moved to Greenoaks Avenue, Darling Point. They had a son and three daughters.

== Partial list of works ==
The following buildings designed either in part or in full by Burcham Clamp:

Buildings designed either in part or in full by Burcham Clamp
Building name	Image	Location	Year completed	Award(s)	Heritage register(s)	Notes
St James' Hall		Phillip Street, Sydney CBD	1903		Demolished in 1961	
Victoria Hall (Part of St Matthew's Church, Manly)		Corner of Darley Road and The Corso, Manly	1901		Demolished in 1928	
Lister Private Hospital and Nurses' Home		Darlinghurst	c. 1910		Demolished in c. 1925	
Wyoming Chambers		175-181 Macquarie Street, Sydney CBD	1909		Local government heritage register	
Castlereagh Chambers		64-68 Castlereagh Street, Sydney CBD	1914			
Farmer's & Co building (former): Farmer & Company (1910–1960); Farmers Blaxland Galleries (1958–1995); Grace Bros (1983–2004); Myer (2004–present)		Corner of Pitt and Market Streets, Sydney CBD	1910			
Sydney Church of England Grammar School Chapel		North Sydney				
St Matthew's Church (with Wright and Apperly)		Manly				
Sydney Tattersall's Club (with Finch)		Between Castlereagh and Elizabeth Streets, Sydney CBD				
Canberra Grammar School (with C. H. Finch)		Canberra				
Ainslie Hotel (with C. H. Finch)		Canberra				
Richard Johnson Obelisk (with C. H. Finch)		Corner of Hunter, Bligh and Castlereagh Streets, Sydney CBD				

== See also ==
- Architecture of Australia
