= Monocrete construction =

Monocrete is a building construction method utilising modular bolt-together pre-cast concrete wall panels.

Monocrete construction was widely used in the construction of government housing in the 1940s and 1950s in Canberra, Australia. The expansion of the new capital was exceeding the ability of the Government to build houses, so alternative construction methods were investigated.

The Canberra monocrete homes are built on brick piers and surrounding brick footing, and all of the walls are of monocrete construction including interior ones. They are precast with steel windows and door frames set directly into the concrete. Steel plates in the ceiling space bolt the individual wall panels together. The floor and roof are of normal construction - wood and tile respectively. The gaps between the wall panels are filled with a flexible gap-filling compound and covered with tape on the interior. It has been suggested that the panels tend to move separately to one another, opening up cracks in between them, and that the houses also tend to be susceptible to condensation build up and mold growth on the inside of the walls.

A similar technique is used in the construction of some modern commercial buildings.
