= Limestone Avenue =

Road in Canberra, Australia

Limestone Avenue Australian Capital Territory
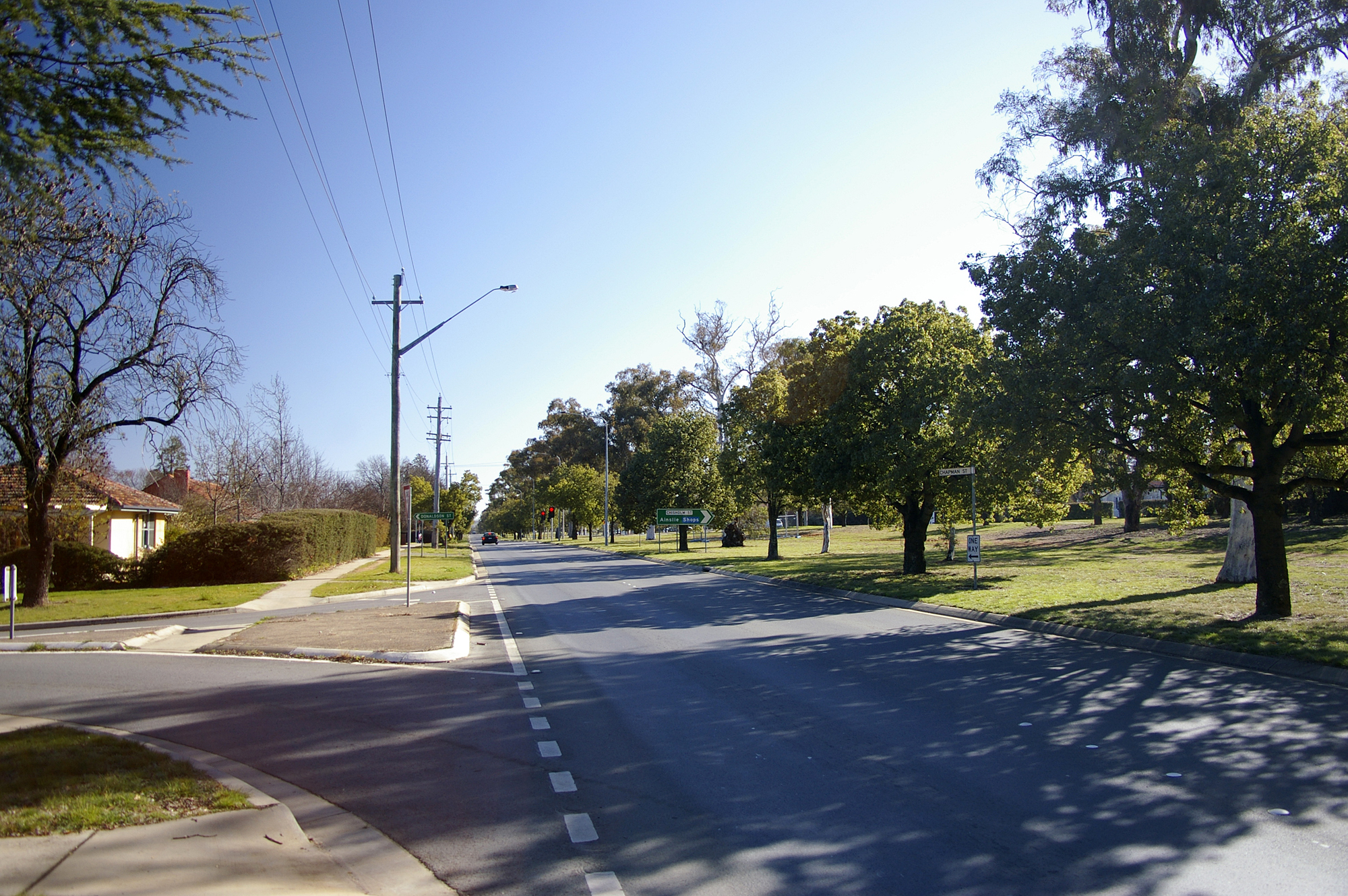
- Limestone Avenue at the intersection of Chapman Street in Braddon

General information
- Type: Road
- Length: 2.6 km (1.6 mi)
- Former route number: ACT Tourist Drive 3 (through Campbell)

Major junctions
- North end: Majura Avenue; Ainslie, Australian Capital Territory
- Ainslie Avenue; Wakefield Avenue
- South end: Anzac Parade; Fairbairn Avenue; Campbell, Australian Capital Territory

Location(s)
- Major suburbs: Ainslie, Braddon, Reid, Campbell

Limestone Avenue is a major arterial road in the inner suburbs of Canberra, the capital city of Australia. It links the major junction of Anzac Parade and Fairbairn Avenue outside the Australian War Memorial, passing Merici College, Campbell High School and the Hotel Ainslie. It provides a bypass of the inner city for commuters between Russell Offices, Campbell Park and Canberra Airport and the Inner North. The name Limestone Avenue was gazetted on 25 August 1943 and commemorates Limestone Plains, an early name for the district. It is configured to a dual carriageway standard carrying two traffic lanes in each direction for its entire length. The speed limit is 60 km/h (37 mph) for the entire length of the road.
