= Alan Harding =

English footballer

Personal information
- Full name: Alan Harding
- Date of birth: 14 May 1948
- Place of birth: Sunderland, England
- Height: 5 ft 9 in (1.75 m)
- Positions: Striker; left winger

Senior career*
Years	Team	Apps	(Gls)
–	Spennymoor United		
1969–1973	Darlington	129	(37)
1973–1979	Lincoln City	209	(38)
1979–1983	Hartlepool United	84	(8)
–	Newcastle Blue Star		
–	Ryhope Colliery Welfare		
- * Club domestic league appearances and goals

Alan Harding (born 14 May 1948) is an English former professional footballer who scored 83 goals from 422 appearances in the Football League playing for Darlington, Lincoln City and Hartlepool United. He played as a striker or on the left wing.

== Life and career ==
Harding was born in Sunderland, which was then in County Durham. He played non-league football for Spennymoor United before joining Darlington in 1969. He scored 37 goals from 129 league appearances over four years for Darlington, then joined Lincoln City in March 1973 for £7,000 plus midfielder Frank McMahon. He spent six years with Lincoln, and was part of the team that won the Fourth Division title in 1975–76. In 1979, he signed for Hartlepool United for £4,000, and spent four years with the club before moving into non-league football in his native north-east of England with Newcastle Blue Star and Ryhope Colliery Welfare.
