= Supported Accommodation Assistance Program =

The Supported Accommodation Assistance Program (SAAP) is aimed at reducing homelessness in Australia. SAAP started in 1985 when Commonwealth and State/Territory funding programs were brought together. The object of the new arrangement was to grant financial assistance to the States to administer the SAAP program. These programs were aimed to provide transitional supported accommodation and related support services, in order to help people who were homeless to achieve the maximum possible degree of self-reliance and independence. Each of the states and territories runs a SAAP program, providing accommodation to 100,000 homeless Australians.

The SAAP programs are aimed at three levels of homeless people:

Primary Homeless
People without conventional accommodation, living on the streets.
Secondary Homeless
People staying in boarding houses and people already in SAAP accommodation and other similar emergency accommodation services.
Tertiary Homeless
People with no secure accommodation staying temporarily with friends or relatives in private dwellings.

In 2011, the Specialist Homelessness Services (SHS) program replaced the SAAP program.

== See also ==
- Housing Commission of Victoria
- Housing NSW
- Public housing in the Australian Capital Territory
- Homelessness in Australia
