= Frank McMahon (footballer) =

Northern Irish footballer

Personal information
- Full name: Francis Gerard McMahon
- Date of birth: 4 January 1950 (age 76)
- Place of birth: Belfast, Northern Ireland
- Position: Midfielder

Senior career*
Years	Team	Apps	(Gls)
–	Distillery		
–	Coventry City	0	(0)
19??–1971	Waterford		
1971–1973	Lincoln City	55	(2)
1973–1974	Darlington	23	(1)
1973	→ Hartlepool (loan)	7	(0)
1974–1978	Yeovil Town		
1978–1979	Bath City	1	(0)

Managerial career
- 1980–198?: Taunton Town
- * Club domestic league appearances and goals

Francis Gerard McMahon (born 4 January 1950) is a former footballer from Northern Ireland who made 85 appearances in the Football League playing for Lincoln City, Darlington and Hartlepool. He played as a midfielder.

== Life and career ==
McMahon was born in Belfast, Northern Ireland. He began his football career with his home-town club, Distillery, before moving to England to join Coventry City. Having failed to break through to the first team, he signed for League of Ireland club Waterford. In 1971, he returned to England, where he joined Lincoln City, for whom he played 63 times, scoring twice, in senior first-team competition. In March 1973, McMahon and £7,000 went to Darlington in part-exchange for Alan Harding. He remained with Darlington for the 1973–74 season, a period that included a month's loan at Hartlepool. and then moved on to Southern League club Yeovil Town.

He remained with Yeovil until March 1978, and then joined Southern League Bath City, but a knee injury sustained within minutes of making his debut effectively ended his playing career. After an unsuccessful attempted comeback in the 1979–80 season, he took up the post of youth team manager with Bath in 1980, and was appointed manager of Taunton Town, also a member of the Southern League, in 1980.

McMahon later moved to the United States where he ran a bar and coached at a soccer school in New Jersey.
