= Ainslie Tennis Club =

Coordinates: 35°16′4″S 149°8′30″E

The Ainslie Tennis Club was one of the first tennis clubs established in Canberra. At 3pm on Saturday 21 April 1928 the club's patron, John Goodwin, officially opened the club and served the first ball. Initial work was done using picks, shovels, horse and dray. The original clubhouse was built in 1930 on the south side of the courts. The current clubhouse was opened in 1955. The club and facilities are located in Corroboree Park.

Ainslie Tennis Club is an incorporated organisation managed by a Committee. Maintenance of the club and Committee management is carried out by volunteer members. The club is also an affiliate of Tennis ACT, which in term is affiliated with Tennis Australia.

The club was awarded ACT 'Tennis Club of the Year' in 1996.

In 2000, two courts were converted to synthetic grass, and in 2002 the third court was converted to synthetic grass.

The club, while proud of its rich tradition, has a modern and competitive outlook.

On 22 August 1927 fifteen people met at the Social Services Cottage in Lister Crescent, Ainslie to discuss the formation of a local tennis and social club. The Ainslie district was growing rapidly and there developed a need for a social outlet for new residents. A provisional committee was appointed to draft a constitution, consult with the Federal Capital Commission on the selection of a site and organise the voluntary labour to be used in construction. Thomas Boag, the Supervisor for Roads and bridges, was placed in charge of the laying of the courts.

The committee agreed to devote seventeen Saturday afternoons to the formation of the club. Initial work was done using picks, shovels, horse and dray. Potential female members supplied billy tea (made in the park) for those men working on construction. Various fundraising events were held including a number of successful euchre parties.

In 1955 it was suggested a new clubhouse be built. Construction was performed by the Department of Works and the present clubhouse was completed in 1957.
