= Mercure Hotel Canberra =

Hotel in Canberra, Australia

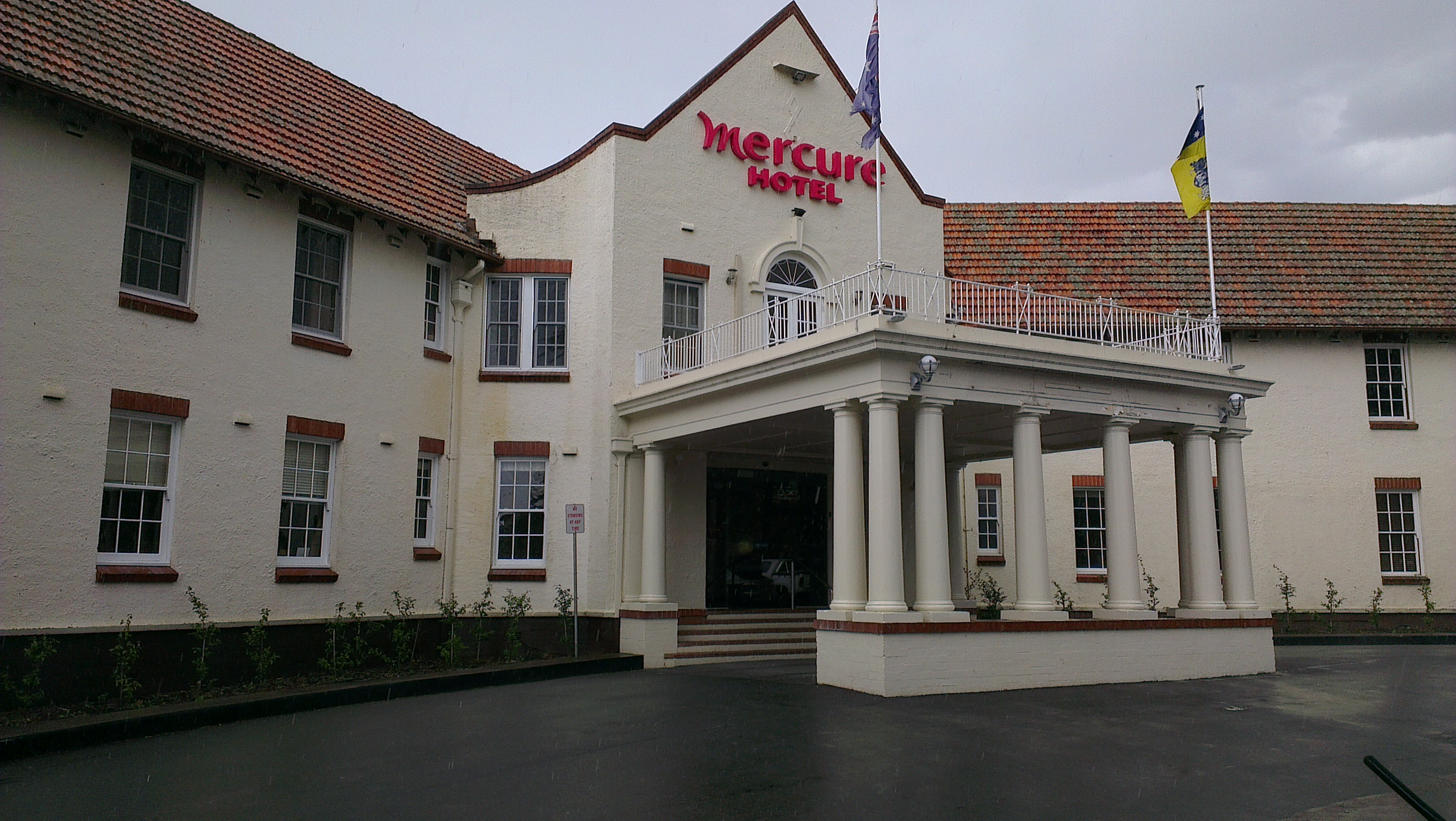

General information
- Coordinates: 35°16′33″S 149°08′34″E
- Opening: 1927
- Owner: Schwartz Family Company
- Operator: Accor Hotels

Technical details
- Floor count: 2

Design and construction
- Architects: Burcham Clamp and Finch
- Developer: Federal Capital Commission

Other information
- Number of rooms: 127
- Number of restaurants: 1
- Parking: Available, complementary

Website
- http://www.mercurecanberra.com.au/

Mercure Hotel Canberra, historically known as the Hotel Ainslie and Olims is a historic, four-star hotel located in the inner Canberra suburb of Braddon, Australian Capital Territory. It is the closest major hotel to the Australian War Memorial and is located on Limestone Avenue. The Hotel Ainslie has been listed on the Australian Institute of Architects' Register of Significant Twentieth Century Architecture since 1984 due to its significance as a rare late example of English Arts and Crafts architecture and was previously listed in the now defunct Register of the National Estate. It is listed on the ACT Heritage Register.

== History ==
The building now occupied by the hotel was built between 1926-27 as one of eight hostels designed to provide accommodation for public servants in preparation of relocating the Parliament from Melbourne to the new national capital. Following the adverse impact of the Great Depression in 1932, a liquor license was granted to building lessee Ernest Spendlove. The building was renovated and shortly thereafter re-opened as a public hotel.

Spendlove sold the hotel in 1950 to Rex Investments, a division of the LJ Hooker, and the name was changed to the Hotel Ainslie Rex. Another change of ownership saw the hotel renamed "Olims" in 1989, a name which remains in common use locally. Prior to the sale, an 87-room extension was completed in 1987 and the bar and restaurant areas were remodeled. The hotel began market itself as a function centre, opening conference rooms. The beer garden was built in a distinctively more modern architectural style, disrupting the building's façade facing Limestone Avenue.

In 2011, the hotel was rebranded by operator Accor Hotels as Mercure Canberra and underwent a $8 million refurbishment, hoping to draw more International guests. A proposal which would have seen an extra 125 rooms added to the hotel encountered strong opposition from the National Trust of Australia due to the impact of the proposal on the building's aesthetics and heritage significance. The proposal was subsequently scaled back.

== Events and charitable fundraising ==
The Canberra Craft Beer Festival has been held annually at the hotel since 2008. Mercure Canberra participates in Room for Hope, a program which allows guests to donate $1 in addition to the room rate to charitable causes.
