= Frank McMahon (poet) =

Australian poet

Frank McMahon (1926 – 4 October 2010) was an Australian poet born in Loxton, South Australia. He published two books of poetry: Tide Pools and The Asphalt and the Stars.

McMahon won several Australian awards for poetry, including "The Bronze Swagman". He wrote works commissioned by the Australian War Memorial in Canberra, including an inscription on a granite slab at the new Parliament House in Canberra and a haiku used in the War Memorial's exhibits.
