= Braddon, Australian Capital Territory =

Suburb of Canberra, Australia

Braddon
- Suburb
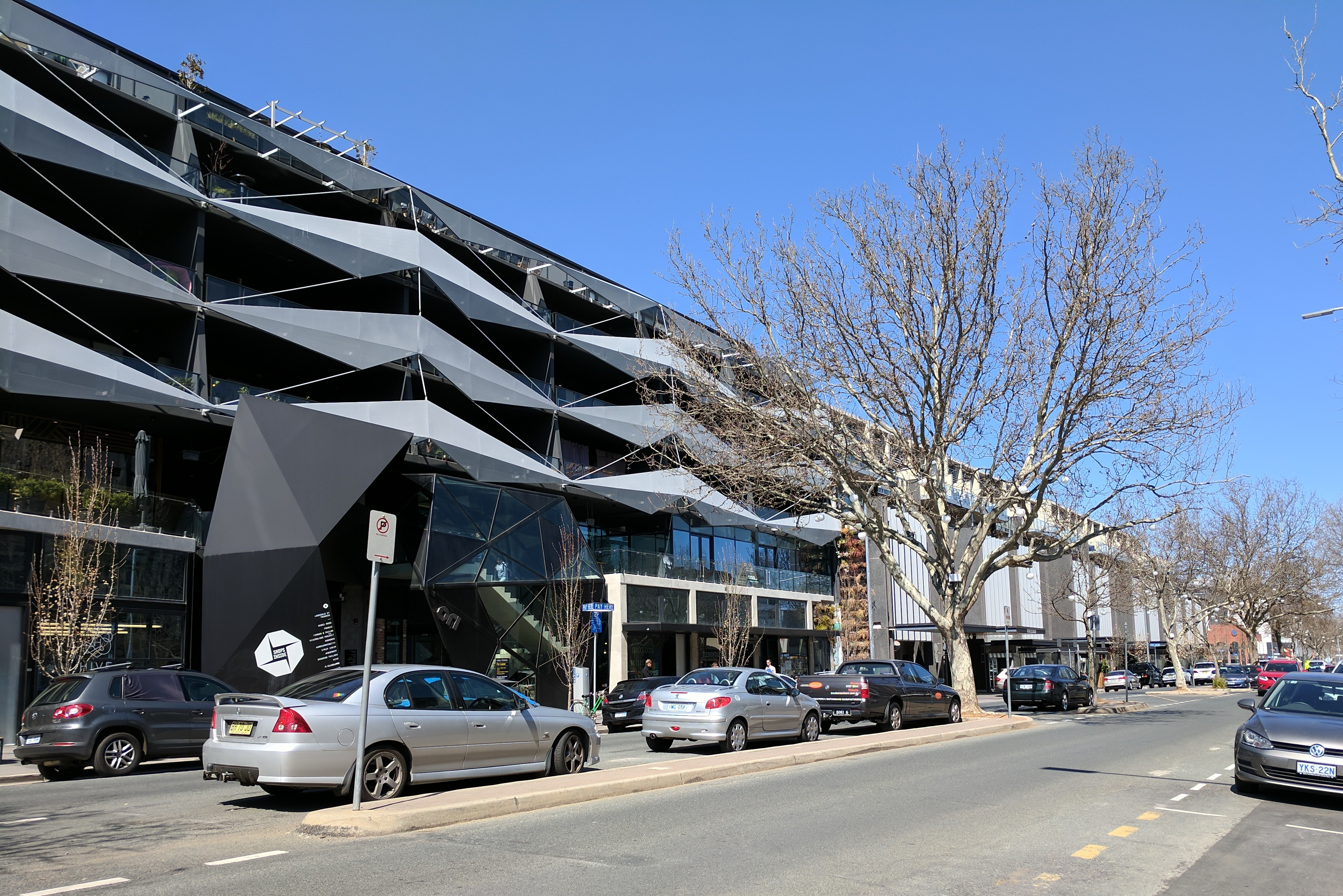
- Lonsdale Street in September 2017

- Coordinates: 35°16′19″S 149°08′08″E
- Country: Australia
- State: Australian Capital Territory
- City: Canberra
- District: North Canberra
- Location: 2 km (1.2 mi) NE of Canberra CBD; 16 km (9.9 mi) NW of Queanbeyan; 88 km (55 mi) SW of Goulburn; 286 km (178 mi) SW of Sydney
- Established: 1922

Government
  - Territory electorate: Kurrajong
  - Federal division: Canberra

Area
  - Total: 1.4 km^{2} (0.54 sq mi)
- Elevation: 576 m (1,890 ft)

Population
  - Total: 6,383 (2021 census)
  - Density: 4,560/km^{2} (11,800/sq mi)
- Postcode: 2612
- Gazetted: 20 September 1928
Suburbs around Braddon
Lyneham	Dickson	Ainslie
Turner	Braddon	Campbell
City	City	Reid

Braddon is an inner north suburb of Canberra, Australian Capital Territory, Australia located adjacent to the Canberra CBD.

Braddon is one of the oldest suburbs in Canberra, a relatively young city, settled in 1922 and gazetted as a division name in September 1928. It contained Canberra's first light-industrial area. In recent years this area has begun to be redeveloped as an entertainment and residential precinct. Other areas have been redeveloped with flats. It is now Canberra's most densely populated suburb.

== History ==
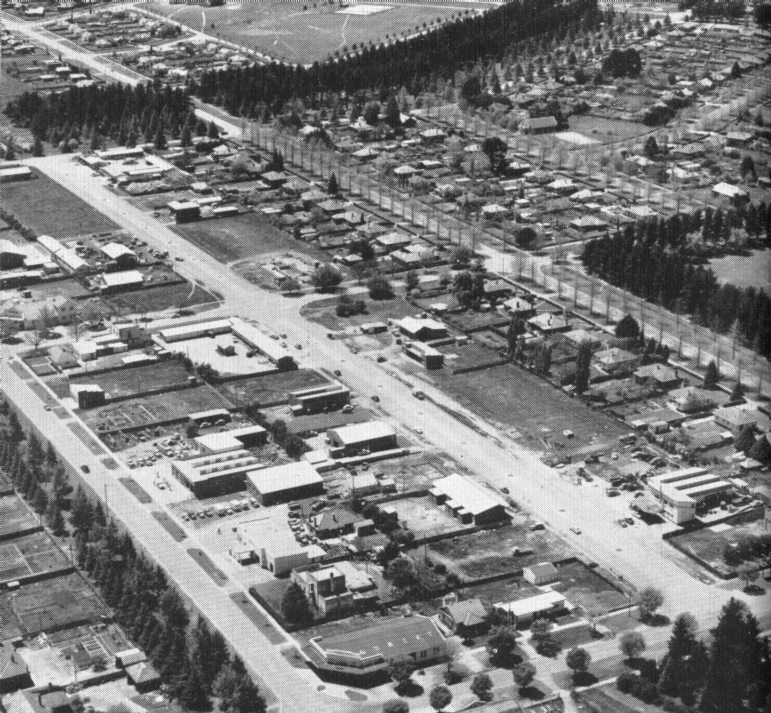
1950 aerial photo of Braddon

The construction of the Braddon Garden City heritage precinct the area bounded by Donaldson, Elimatta, Batman and Currong streets began in 1921 and 1922. This was the only completed example of a design for a residential area in Canberra by Walter Burley Griffin. The suburb was gazetted as a division name in September 1928. Braddon is named after Edward Braddon, a Federalist, legislator and a participant in the writing of the Australian Constitution. Streets in Braddon were named for Aboriginal words, legislators and pioneers. The first light-industrial area in Canberra was established in Braddon in the 1920s and subsequently became the centre of automotive trades, before these businesses were established in the service areas of Phillip, Belconnen and Tuggeranong and in Fyshwick and Mitchell. In recent years the light-industrial area has begun to be redeveloped as an entertainment and residential precinct. Most of the residential areas of the suburb have been redeveloped with flats.

=== Heritage listed areas ===
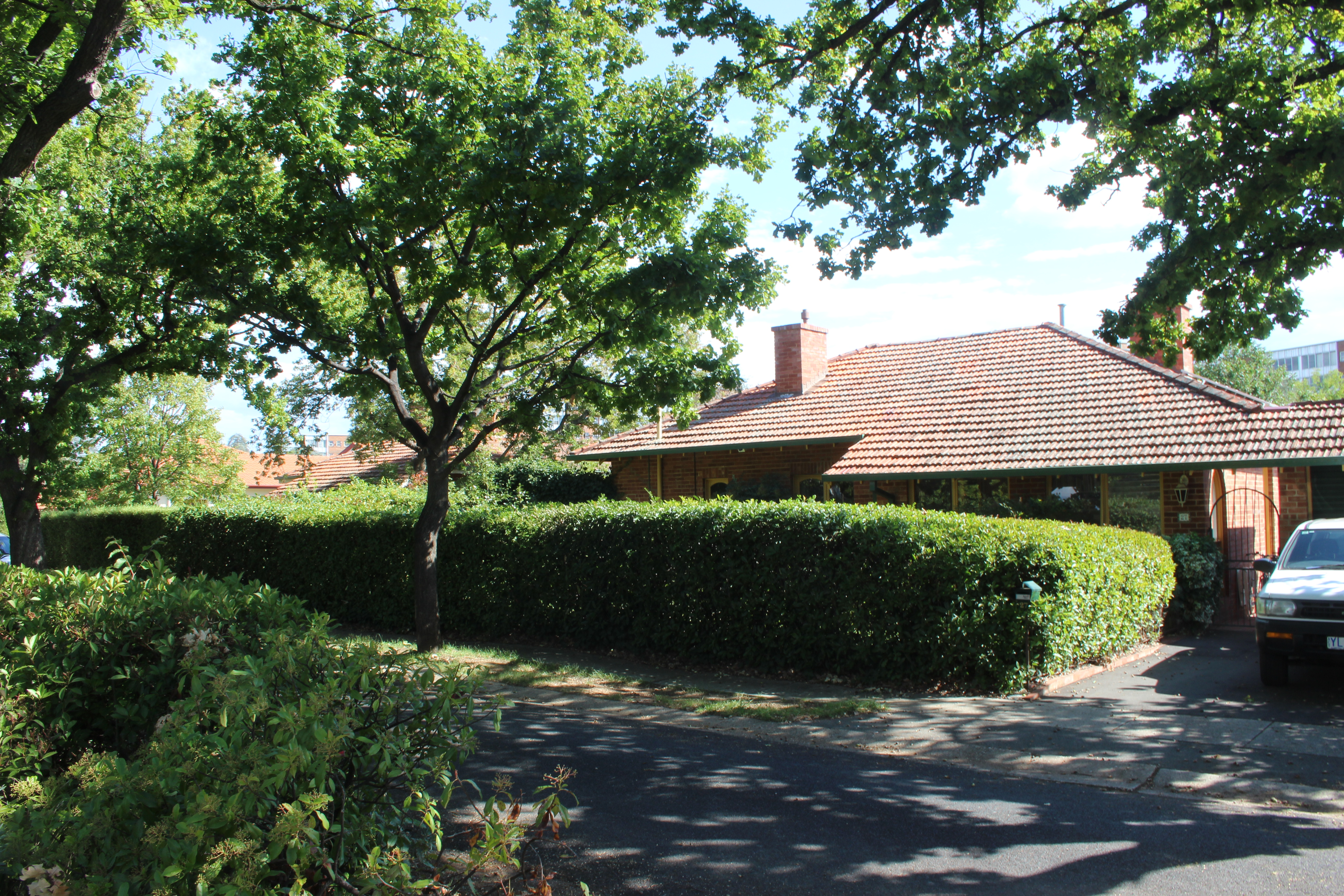
Braddon Garden City heritage precinct house

The following areas are heritage listed:

- The Braddon Garden City heritage precinct, bounded by Donaldson, Elimatta, Batman and Currong streets.
- Gorman House
- Hotel Ainslie (Mercure Canberra)
- Ainslie Primary
- The Whitley House at the corner of Limestone Avenue and Ipima Street, a modernist house built in 1939, considered by the ACT Heritage Council to be "among the first government designed and built single-storey detached houses in the Functionalist style in Australia." The Heritage Council has permitted flats to be built behind the house, but the view of the house from Limestone Avenue has been preserved.
- Haig Park.
- Northbourne Oval.
- The former Coggan's Bakery, 36 Mort Street, Braddon.

== Description ==
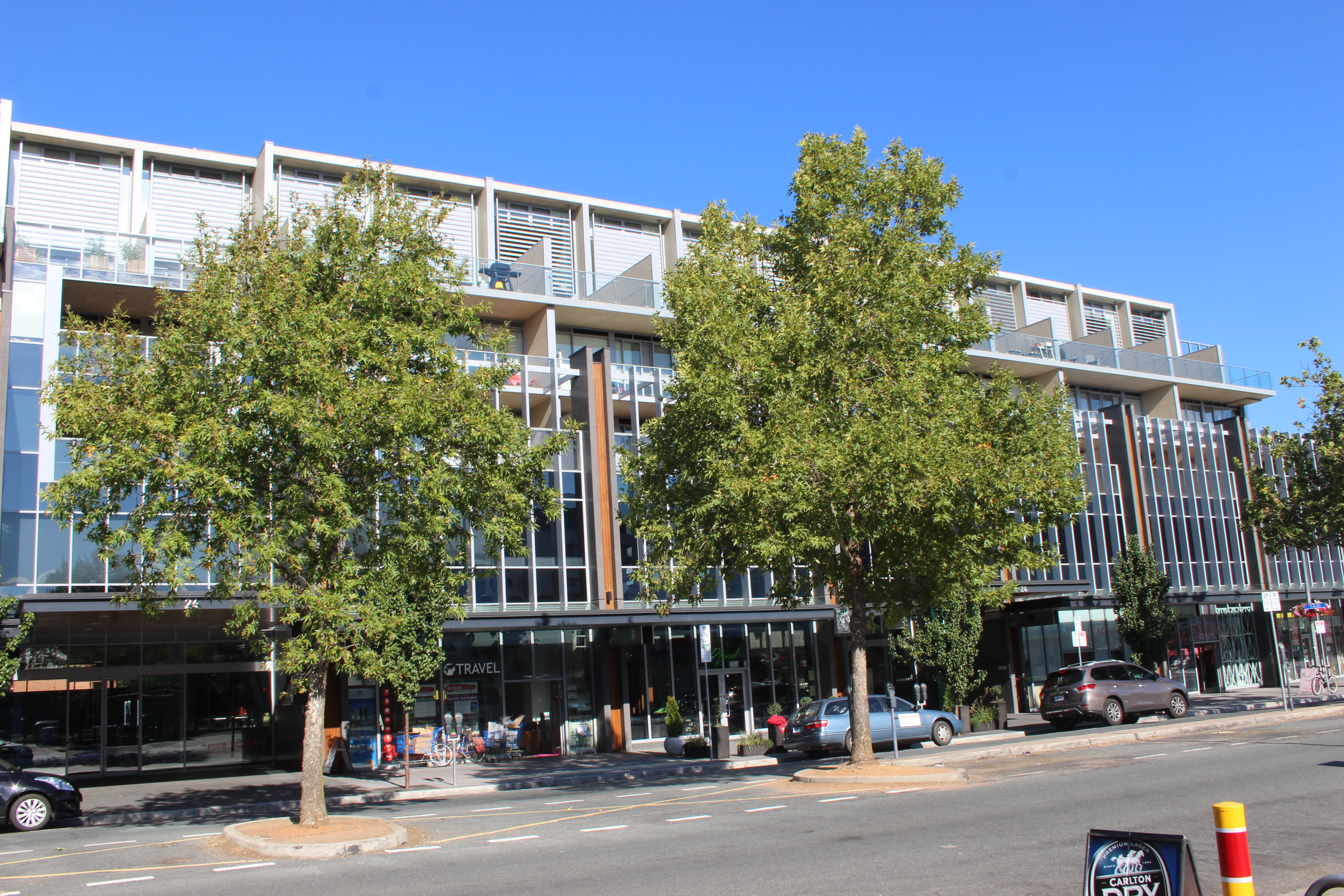
Mixed use development in Lonsdale Street

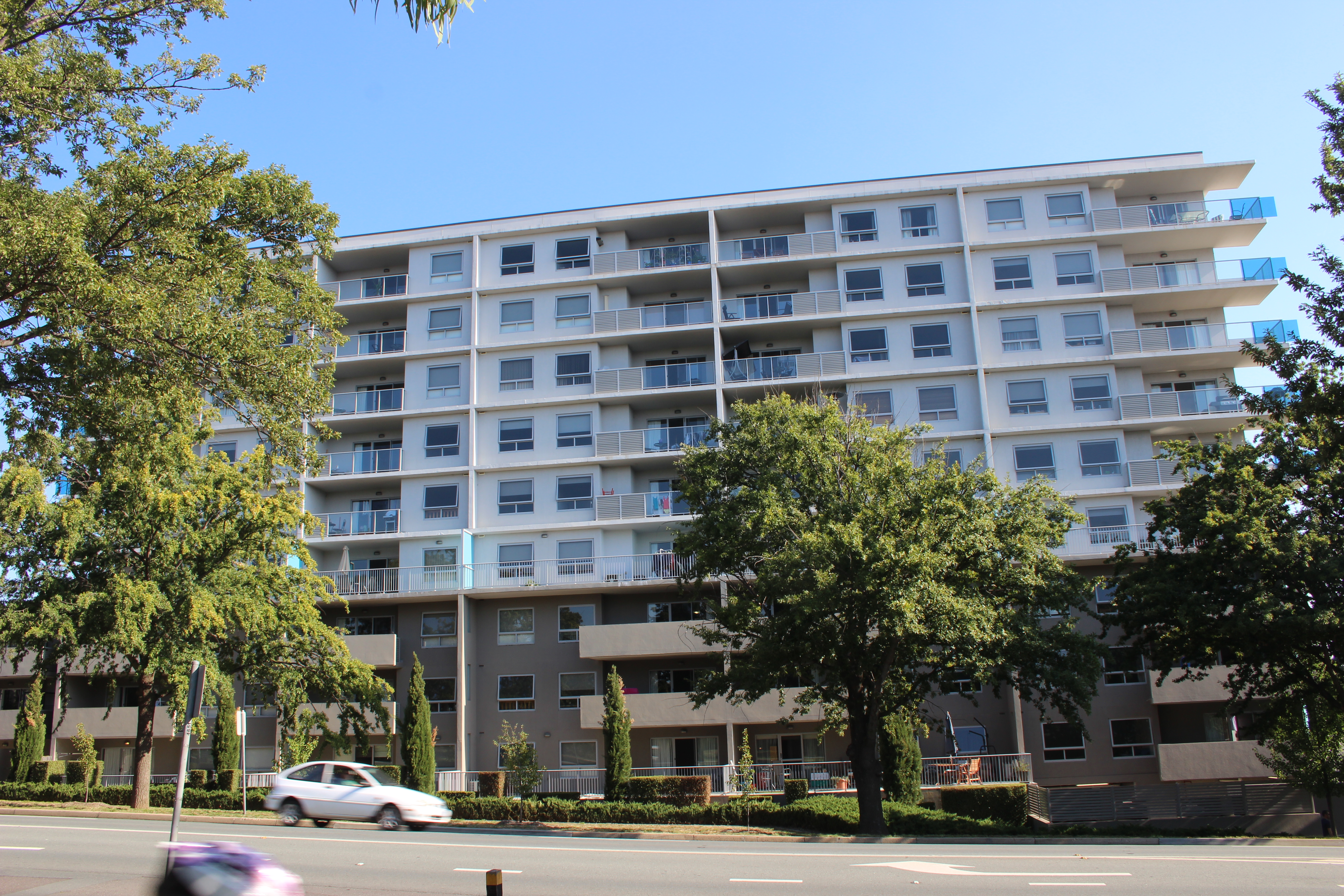
Modern flats in Wakefield Avenue on the northern edge of Braddon

Braddon contains a commercial area centred on Mort and Lonsdale streets, which run parallel to Northbourne Avenue. The area includes several small art galleries, car rental agencies, a few mid-market restaurants, cafes and bars, trendy gift and clothes shops, as well as liquor stores and a Centrelink office. It formerly contained many car dealerships and businesses providing automotive services, but some of these are being redeveloped with six-storey apartment buildings with commercial uses on the ground floor. There are also a number of popular pubs and low-rise office blocks in the suburb.

Away from the commercial areas, much of the previously suburban housing in Braddon has been replaced with apartment buildings that are popular due to their relatively close proximity to the city. The old Fenner Hall, a residence of the Australian National University, is located along Northbourne Avenue, now as the Canberra Accommodation Centre. The suburb is socially mixed with its population including many younger professionals and students, along with some recipients of public housing assistance. Some traditional single-family homes do remain where the suburb borders Ainslie and Dickson.

=== Current zoning ===
Most of the single houses north of Haig Park and in Section 22 (surrounded by Torrens, Girrahween, Fawkner and Elouera streets) have been replaced by two or three-storey flats in recent years as a result of being zoned in the Inner North Precinct. Land adjoining Northbourne Avenue is now zoned to permit redevelopment with 25 metres (about 8 storeys) high flats or 32 metres (about 11 storeys) at the corners of Wakefield Avenue with Northbourne Avenue. The area south of Haig Park between Mort and Torrens streets in zoned to allow mixed use developments, generally 22 metres high (6 or 7 storeys), but 16 metres high (5 storeys) facing Torrens street and up to 30 metres high (about 10 storeys) facing Cooyong street.

The area between Ainslie Avenue, Cooyong, Donaldson and Currong street, currently occupied by four and eight-storey government flats (Allawah Court and Currong Apartments) and Catholic church land, is currently proposed for redevelopment with mixed-use buildings, with a range of building heights between 5 and 12 storeys. Originally two buildings at the corners of Ainslie Avenue were proposed to be 15 storeys high. The eastern parts of the suburb continue to be zoned for low-rise suburban housing except the sections adjacent to Ainslie Avenue, which are zoned for three-storey flats, except for Gorman House—which is heritage listed—and the Hotel Ainslie (Mercure Canberra) site—which is also heritage listed and zoned for a two-storey hotel.

== Features ==
=== Ainslie School ===
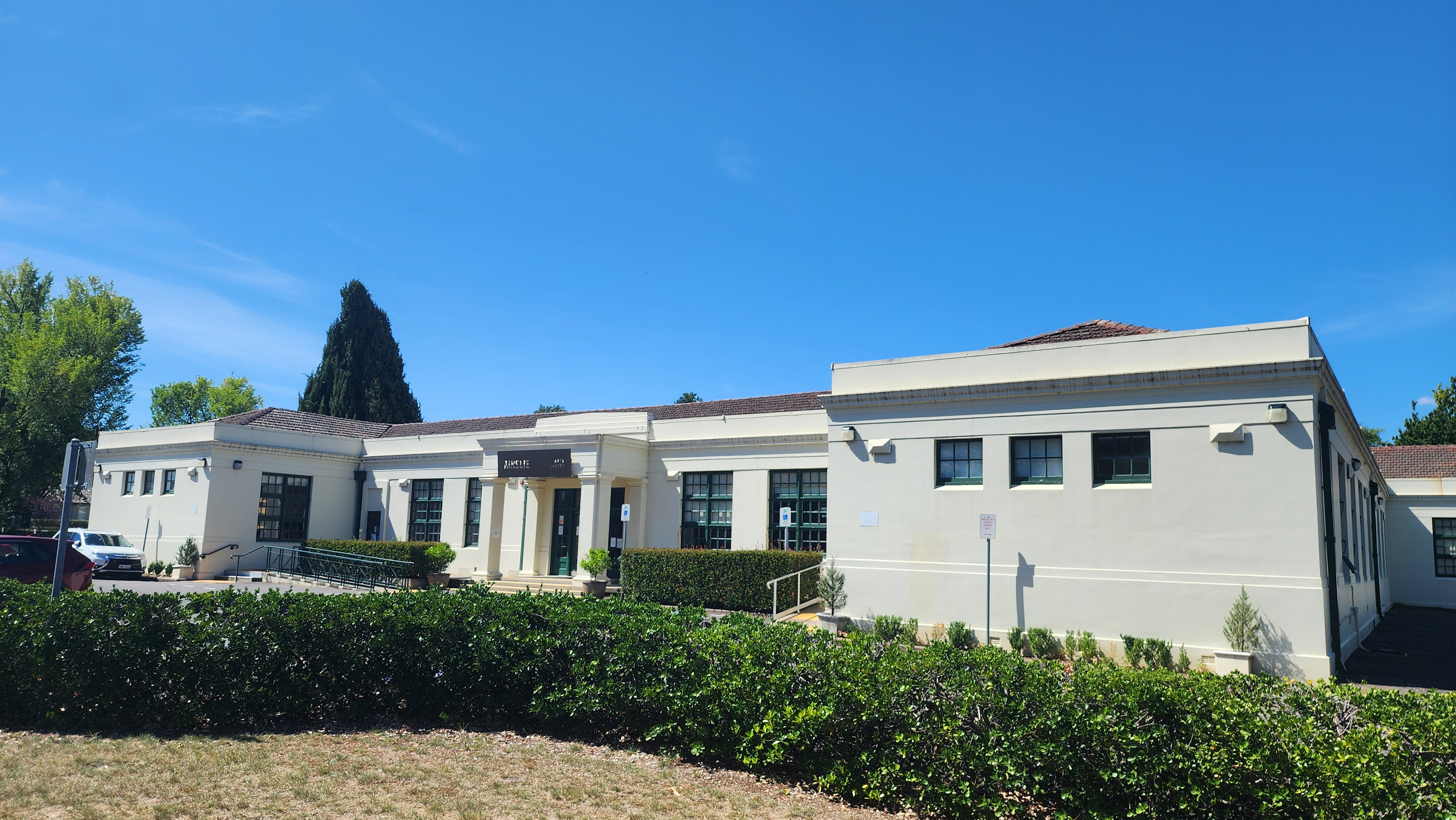
Ainslie Public School, opened in 1927, now Ainslie Arts Centre

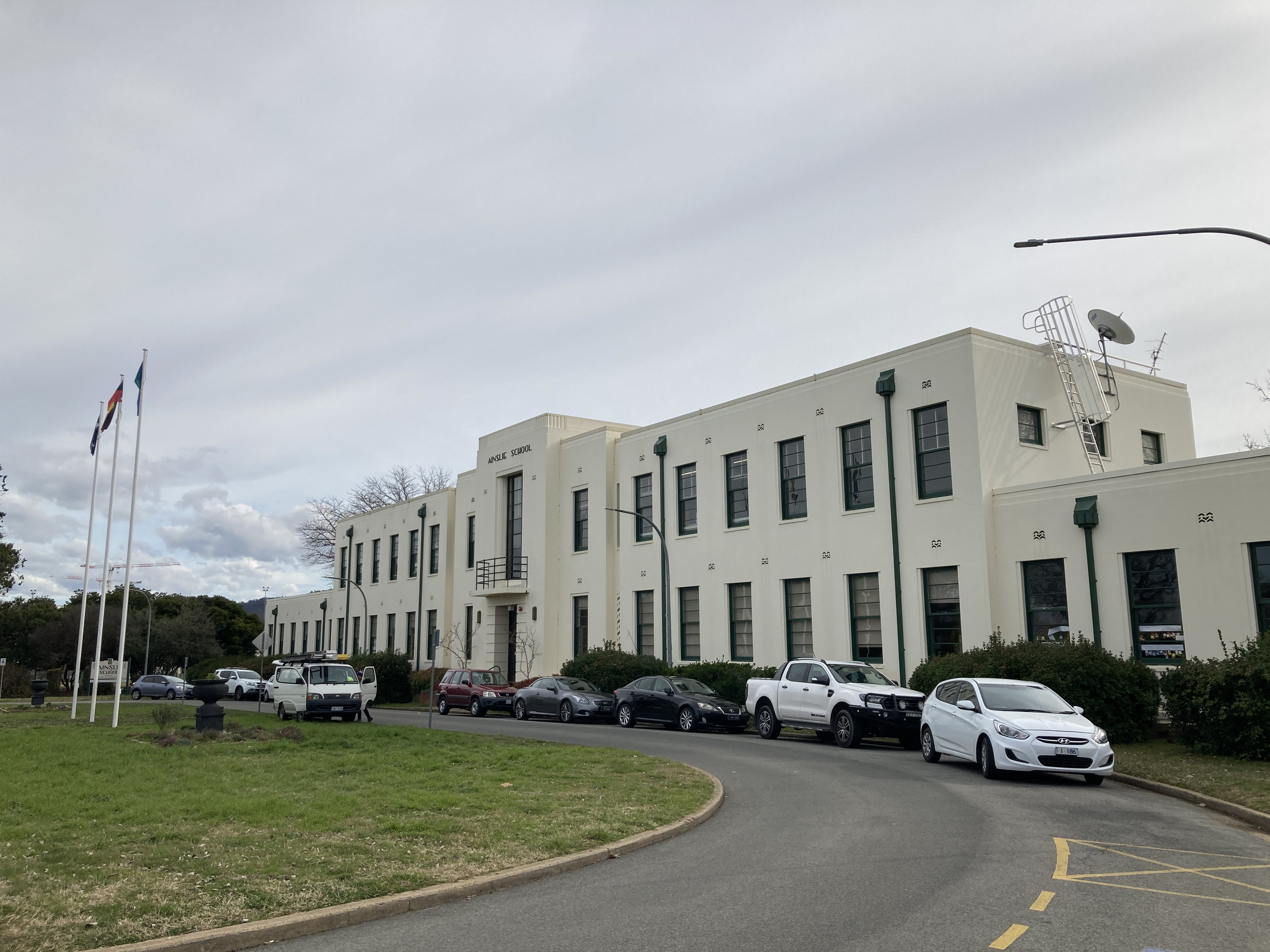
Ainslie Primary School

Ainslie School fronts onto Donaldson Street is one of Canberra's oldest schools. It was opened in 1927 as the first official act of the Prime Minister Stanley Bruce following his arrival in Canberra. It is described by the ACT Heritage Commission as having "a high degree of integrity with intact street and site planting and relatively intact built elements and original internal fittings in the Art Deco style." It is also believed to be "the first in Australia to be planned with a library, a lecture room and a needlework room". The original building was completed in 1927 and, with the opening of a larger building for the primary in 1938, it became the infants school. From 1980, the building was occupied by Questacon (until 1988) and the School Without Walls (until 1997). In recent years it has been occupied by the Ainslie Arts Centre.

=== Allawah Court and Currong Apartments ===
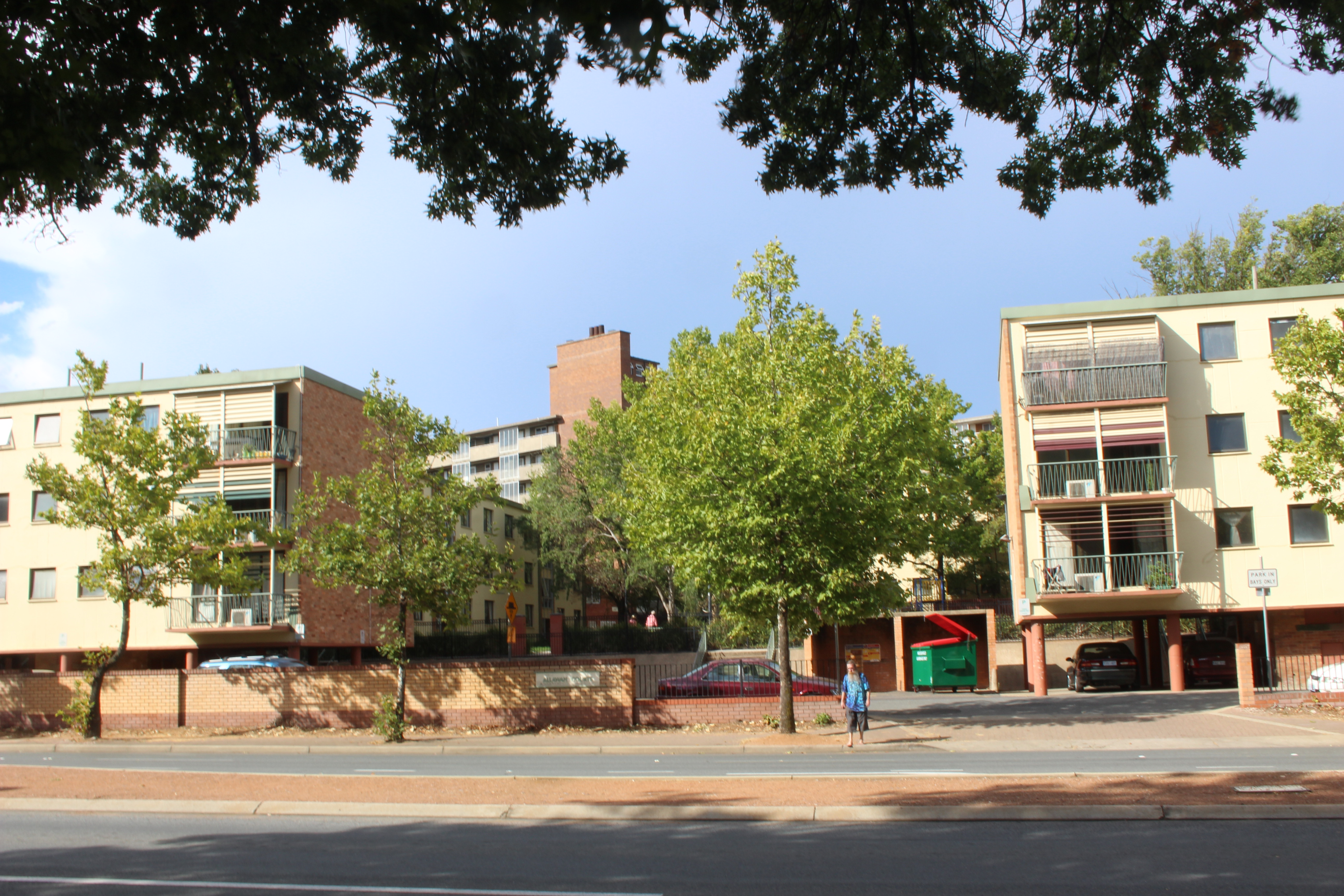
Former Allawah Court, with the Currong Apartments behind, in 2014. Demolition was completed in 2017.

The three-storey Allawah Court flats (containing 114 two-bedroom flats) were completed east of Cooyong street and north of Ainslie Avenue in 1956, the three-storey Bega Court was completed south of Ainslie Avenue in Reid in 1957 and the eight-storey Currong Apartments (184 one-bedroom flats and 28 of two bedrooms) were completed east of Allawah Court and west of Currong Street in 1959 in order to cope with a critical lack of accommodation for public servants transferred to Canberra. The ACT Heritage Council described them as having been designed in the Post-War International style "similar to post-war housing in Europe, particularly in English new towns. The fine proportions, crisp detailing and low scale of [the Allawah and Bega Courts] and their siting continuing the street pattern made them more architecturally successful than the three eight-storey blocks of flats along Currong Street which completed the development." The Heritage Council declined to heritage list the buildings and despite some local opposition it was proposed that they be demolished and replaced by more modern and denser accommodation along with some commercial uses. The demolition was completed in August 2017.

=== Braddon Garden City heritage precinct ===
The area bounded by Donaldson, Elimatta, Batman and Currong streets, including the street furniture, are heritage listed as "an early 20th century 'Garden City' planned subdivision" and as an example of early Federal Capital planning philosophy and architecture among other things. This area was originally named the "Ainslie Cottages Project" and the first houses were constructed between 1921 and 1922 to meet the urgent need for housing for lower grade public servants and workmen to build the civic centre and other parts of the city. It is the first expression of the Garden City concept in Canberra and it is the only completed example of a design for a residential area in Canberra by Walter Burley Griffin.

=== The Former Coggan's Bakery ===
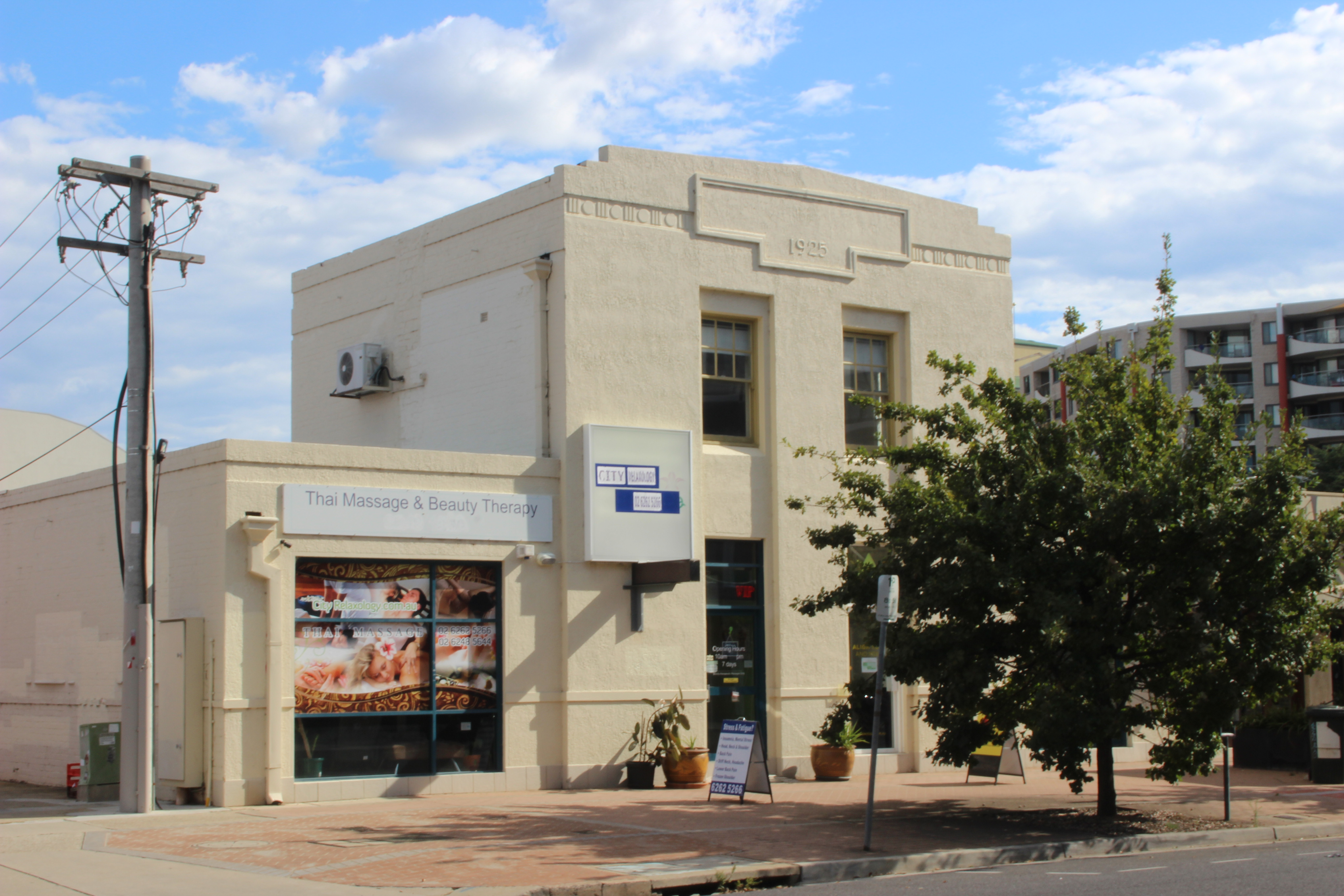
The Former Coggan's Bakery from the 1920s in Elouera Street

According to the ACT Heritage Council, the former Coggan's Bakery, 36 Mort Street (actually facing Elouera Street), "has a special association with the cultural phase of early planning and development of the nation's capital in the 1920s." It formed part of the Federal Capital Commission's early planning and was established with the designation of the Braddon area as a light-industrial zone. The Heritage Council said that Coggan's Bakery "remains as the most historically distinctive structure in the Braddon industrial area."

=== Gorman House Arts Centre ===
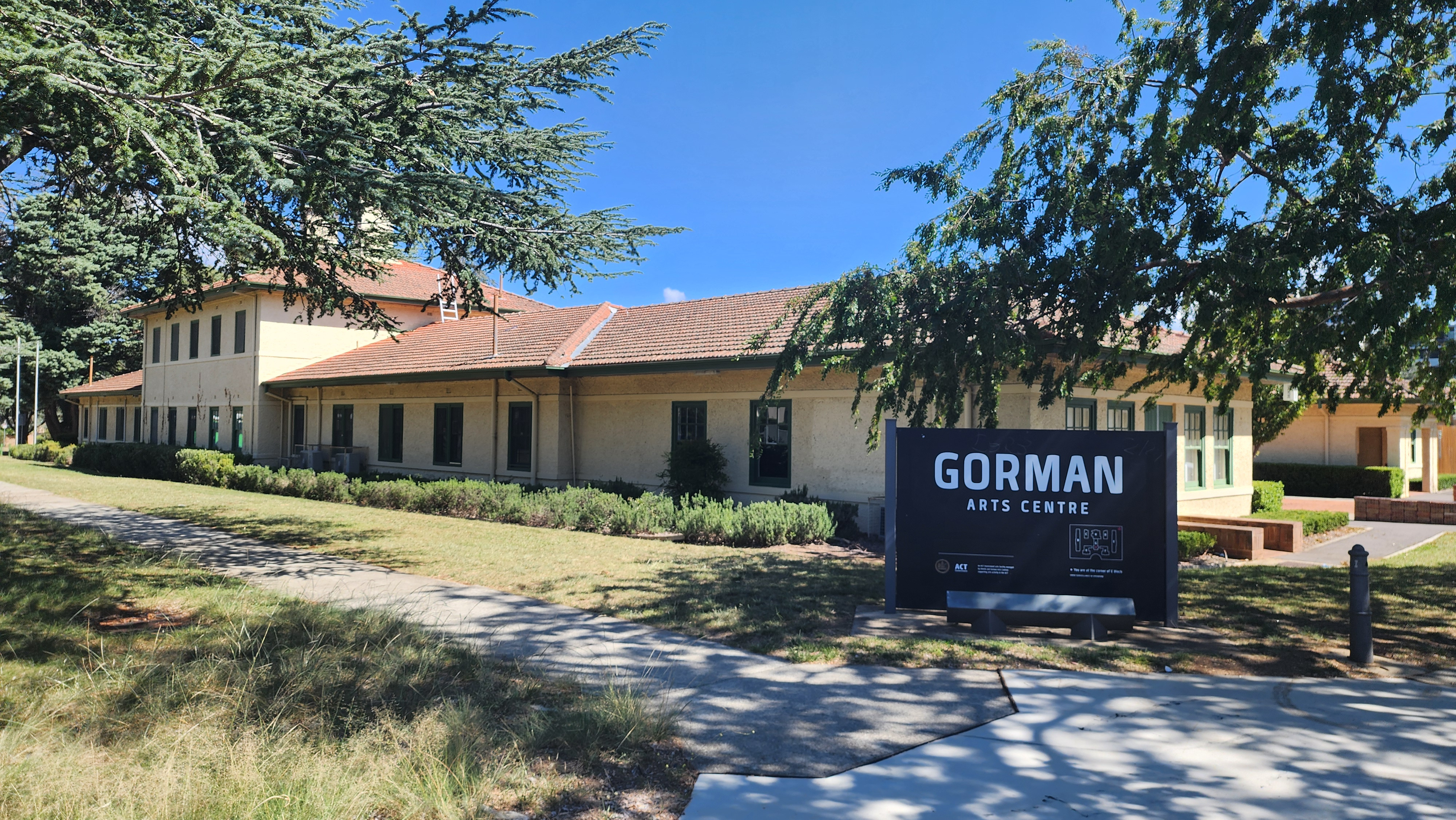
Gorman Arts Centre

The Gorman House Arts Centre is a significant heritage complex that has been adapted for arts use. It is occupied by some of the ACT's key arts organisations, smaller arts groups and individual artists.

The centre accommodates intimate performance spaces, dance studios and workshops, a gallery, artists' studios, small offices for arts business, meeting rooms and a weekend art, craft and second-hand market.

Braddon's theatres and galleries are located within the Gorman House Arts Centre. They are: Bogong Theatre; Canberra Contemporary Art Space; Canberra Youth Theatre; Currong Theatre Studio; and Ralph Wilson Theatre

=== Haig Park ===
Haig Park lies on either side of Northbourne Avenue in Braddon and Turner and comprises fourteen rows of trees planted to form a windbreak and shelterbelt. It is listed on the ACT Heritage register.

=== Hotel Ainslie (Mercure Canberra) ===
The Hotel Ainslie (currently operating as the Mercure Canberra) was built in the English Arts and Craft style as a government hostel to accommodate the transfer of public servants in 1926 and 1927. Since 1928 it has operated as a hotel (at times called the Ainslie Rex and Olims Canberra Hotel) and has been extended significantly to the southwest. The exterior of the original structure, the garden in front of the hotel, including the Atlas cedars, Mediterranean cypresses and the Atlas cedars along Batman Street and the landscaped central courtyard are heritage listed.

=== Lonsdale Street ===
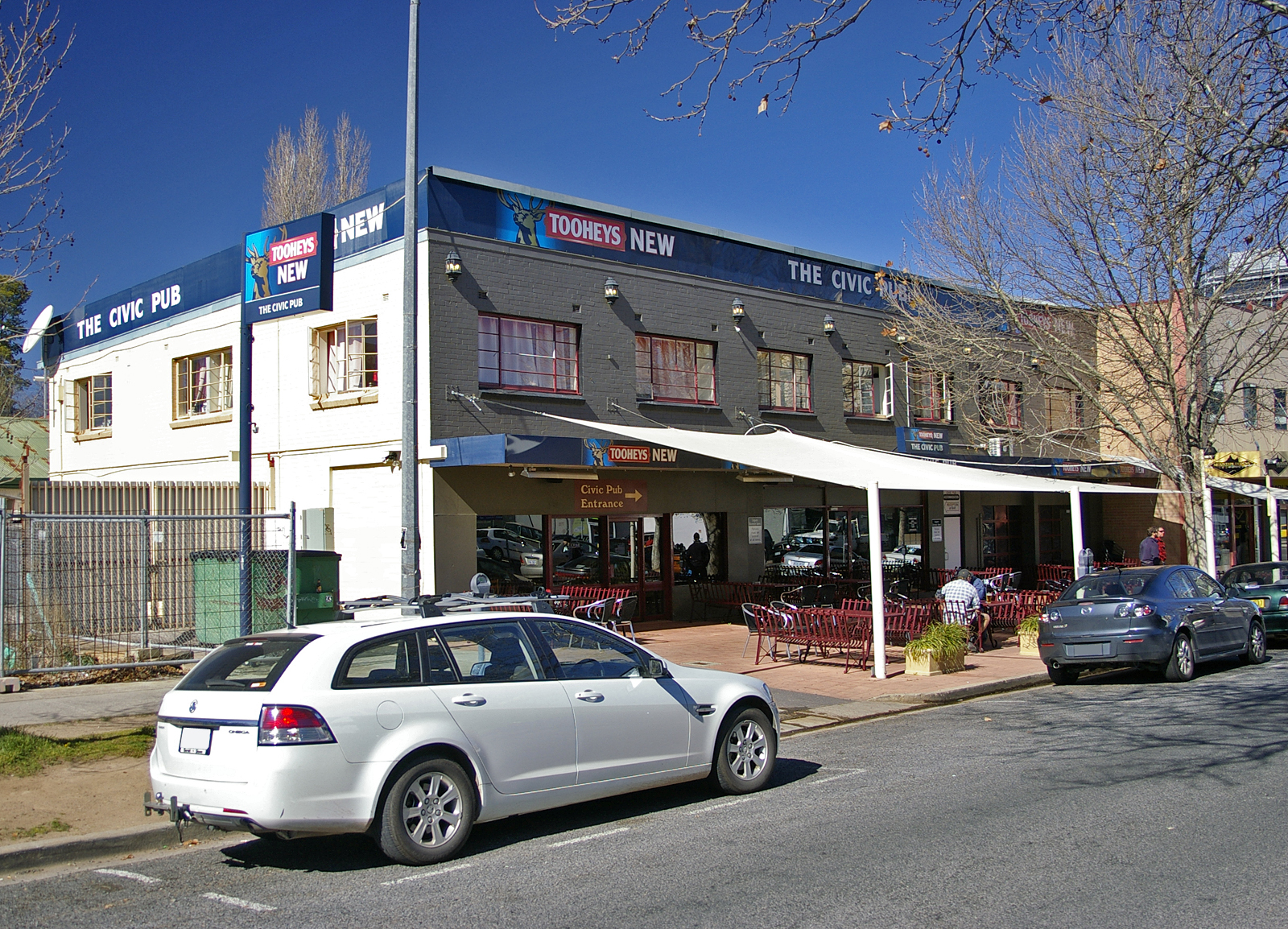
The Civic Pub, a bar on Lonsdale Street, Braddon

Historically an industrial area comprising car yards and factories, Lonsdale Street has in recent decades transformed into a cosmopolitan hub and the commercial centre of Braddon. Lonsdale Street is home to shops selling items by original Canberra designers, stylish Australian fashions, imported designer shoes and handcrafted gifts and homewares. There is also a mix of restaurants, bakeries, bike shops, food vans, camping stores, car yards and hairdressing salons.

During the Summernats car festival, Lonsdale Street is the site of an annual unofficial street parade, the Lonsdale Street Cruise. The parade features all types of cars and draws crowds of spectators.

Lonsdale Street was named Canberra's 'hippest hood' by The Sydney Morning Herald in September 2013.

=== Merici College ===
Merici College is a private Roman Catholic girls' high school catering for years 7 to 12.

=== Northbourne Flats ===
The Northbourne Flats are located on both sides of Northbourne Avenue in Braddon and Turner. The flats provided the first high-density housing project on Northbourne Avenue, now characterised by high-density living. In 2011, the ACT Government ran a national design competition to remodel the flats, to make way for the new development current public housing tenants will be relocated to other properties.

=== Northbourne Oval ===
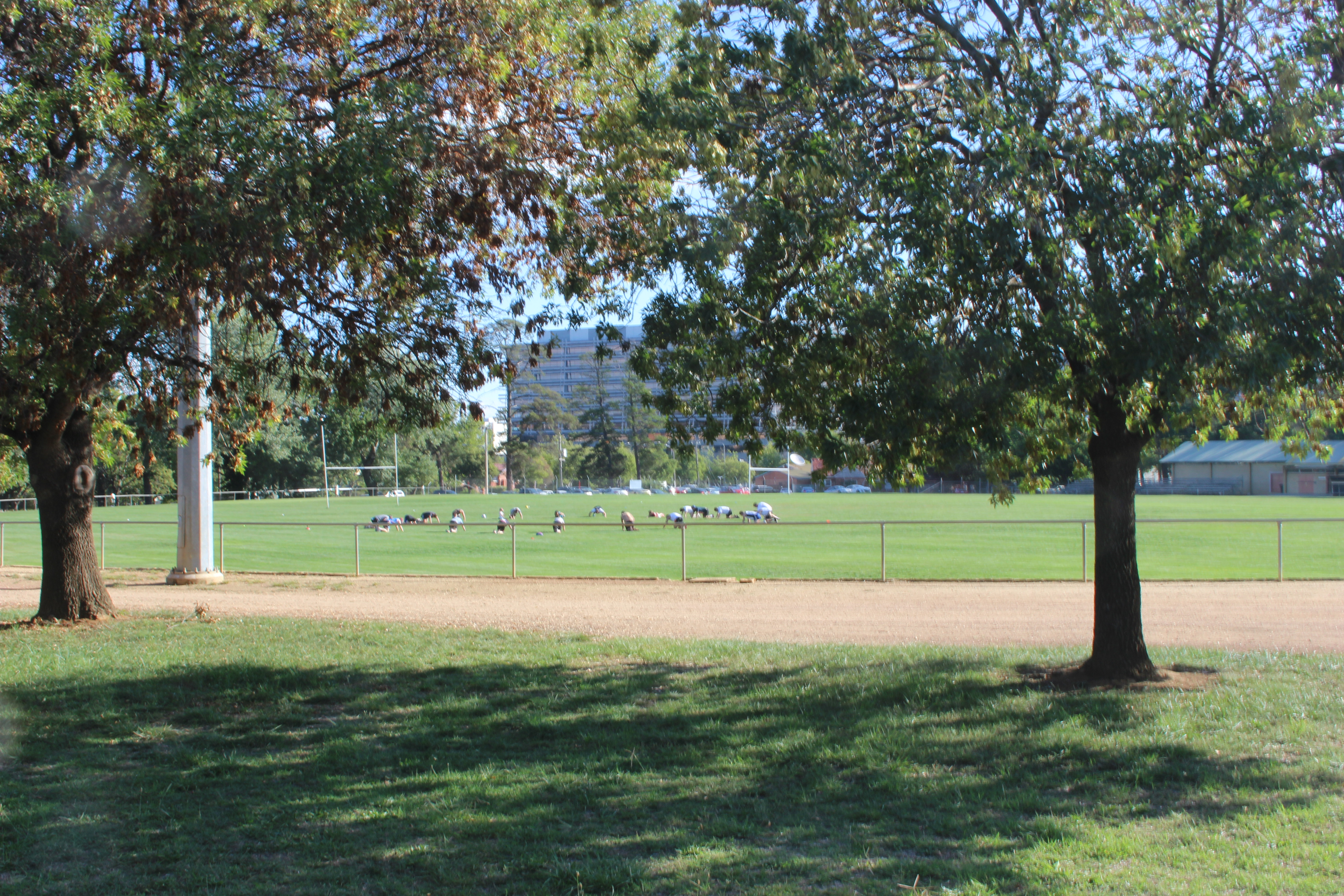
Northbourne Oval

Northbourne Oval was established in 1925, making it North Canberra's oldest enclosed oval. It is listed by the ACT Heritage Council. Since 2020 the oval has been in used by the Canberra Raiders as their training ground.

=== Places of worship ===
- St Patrick's Catholic Church, built in 1935.
- St Columbus Uniting Church
- Salvation Army Canberra City Temple
- St Mary's Catholic Church
- Sisters of Mercy
- Australian Episcopal Conference

== Demographics ==
At the 2021 census, Braddon had a population of 6,383 people, up significantly from a population of 3,574 in 2006. Braddon residents had a median age of 30, which is younger than the ACT median of 35 and the Australian median of 38. The median weekly household income was $3,029, compared to the median Australian household income of $2,120. 45.3% of the population were professionals, compared to the Australian average of 24.0%. 25.4% worked in central government administration, compared to the Australian average of 1.1%, although the ACT-wide average is a similar 17.1%.

61.5 per cent of Braddon's population were Australian-born on census night 2021. The next most common countries of birth were China 6.8%, England 3.5%, India 3.0%, New Zealand 1.4% and South Korea 1.3%. 63.6% of people spoke only English at home. Other languages spoken at home were Mandarin 8.1%, Cantonese 1.8%, Spanish 1.5%, Korean 1.2% and Hindi 1.1%. 59.5% of the population had no religion, while 13.2% were Catholic, 6.7% not stated, 4.3% Anglican and 2.9% Hindu.

Of occupied private dwellings in Braddon, 11.2 per cent were owned outright, 26.9 per cent were owned with a mortgage and 60.4 per cent were rented. Only 4.9% of dwellings were separate houses (compared to the Australian average of 72.3%), while 14.1% were semi-detached, row or terrace houses (Australian average: 12.6%) and 80.7% were flats, units or apartments (Australian average: 14.2%).

After demographic analysis, Braddon was named one of the hippest places to live in Australia on the 'Urbis Hip List' in 2012.

== Governance ==
2025 federal election
Labor	47.70%
Greens	25.03%
Liberal	11.57%
2024 ACT election
Labor	37.7%
Greens	20.6%
Liberal	17.2%
Independents for Canberra	16.1%

Braddon is located within the federal electorate of Canberra and it is represented in the House of Representatives by Alicia Payne for the Labor Party. In the ACT Legislative Assembly, Braddon is part of the electorate of Kurrajong, which elects five members on the basis of proportional representation, two Labor, one Green, one Liberal and one Independent. Polling place statistics are shown to the right for the Ainslie polling place at Ainslie School (in Braddon) in the 2025 federal election for Fenner and in the 2024 ACT election.

== Trees and vegetation ==
Braddon's vegetation is predominantly exotic, belonging to the cedar, ash, oak and pine varieties, although there are a significant number of eucalypts which are planted mainly around the perimeter of the suburb (Northbourne Avenue, Limestone Avenue, Ainslie Avenue) and within Haig Park. Most of the neighbourhood's streets are lined with avenues of mature exotic trees. Torrens Street, planted with oak (Quercus palustris), is a particularly fine example of a 'garden city' streetscape. Haig Park has mixed plantings including cedar, eucalypt, pine, cypress, ash and oak (Cedrus deodara, Eucalyptus cinerea, Pinus radiata, Cupressus sempervirens, Fraxinus velutina and Quercus palustris respectively).

Poisonous mushrooms are known to grow in Braddon, including death caps which are commonly found near established oak trees.

== Street names in Braddon ==
The streets in Braddon are named after Aboriginal words, legislators and pioneers.

- Ainslie Avenue. Named for James Ainslie (1787–1844).
- Batman Street. Named for John Batman (1800–1839).
- Burra Place. Named for an Aboriginal word meaning 'wait' or 'stop'.
- Chapman Street. Named for Austin Chapman (1864–1926).
- Coolac Place. Named for an Aboriginal word meaning 'native bear'.
- Cooyong Street. Named for an Aboriginal word meaning 'bandicoot'.
- Currong Street North. Named for an Aboriginal word meaning ‘silver wattle’.
- Donaldson Street. Named for Stuart Donaldson (1812–1867).
- Doonkuna Street. Named for an Aboriginal word meaning 'rising ground'.
- Dooring Street. Named for an Aboriginal word meaning 'the bark of trees'.
- Elder Street. Named for Thomas Elder (1818–1897).
- Elimatta Street. Named for an Aboriginal word meaning 'my home'.
- Elouera Street. Named for an Aboriginal word meaning 'pleasant place'.
- Farrer Street. Named for William James Farrer (1845–1906).
- Fawkner Street. Named for John Pascoe Fawkner (1792–1869).
- Gilchrist Gardens. Named for John Gilchrist (1938–1998), a Canberran Town Planner.
- Girrahween Street. Named for an Aboriginal word meaning 'place of flowers'.
- Gooreen Street. Named for an Aboriginal word meaning 'wind'.
- Helemon Street. Named for an Aboriginal word meaning 'a shield'.
- Henty Street. Named for Edward Henty (1810–1878).
- Ijong Street. Named for an Aboriginal word meaning 'water'.
- Ipima Street. Named for an Aboriginal word meaning 'two'.
- Limestone Avenue. Named for 'Limestone Plains', an early name of the Canberra district.
- Lonsdale Street. Named for William Lonsdale (1800–1864).
- Mort Street. Named for Thomas Sutcliffe Mort (1816–1878).
- Northbourne Avenue. Name comes from the combination of the words 'north' and 'bourne', north because the road is on the northern side of Canberra and bourne from an old French word meaning limit or boundary.
- Sulman Gardens. Named for John Sulman (1849–1934).
- Torrens Street. Named for Robert Torrens (1814–1884).
- Wakefield Avenue. Named for Edward Gibbon Wakefield (1796–1862).
- Wise Street. Named for Bernhard Ringrose Wise (1858–1916).

== Geology ==
Calcareous shales from the Canberra Formation are overlain by Quaternary alluvium. This rock is the limestone of the original title of Canberra "Limestone Plains".
